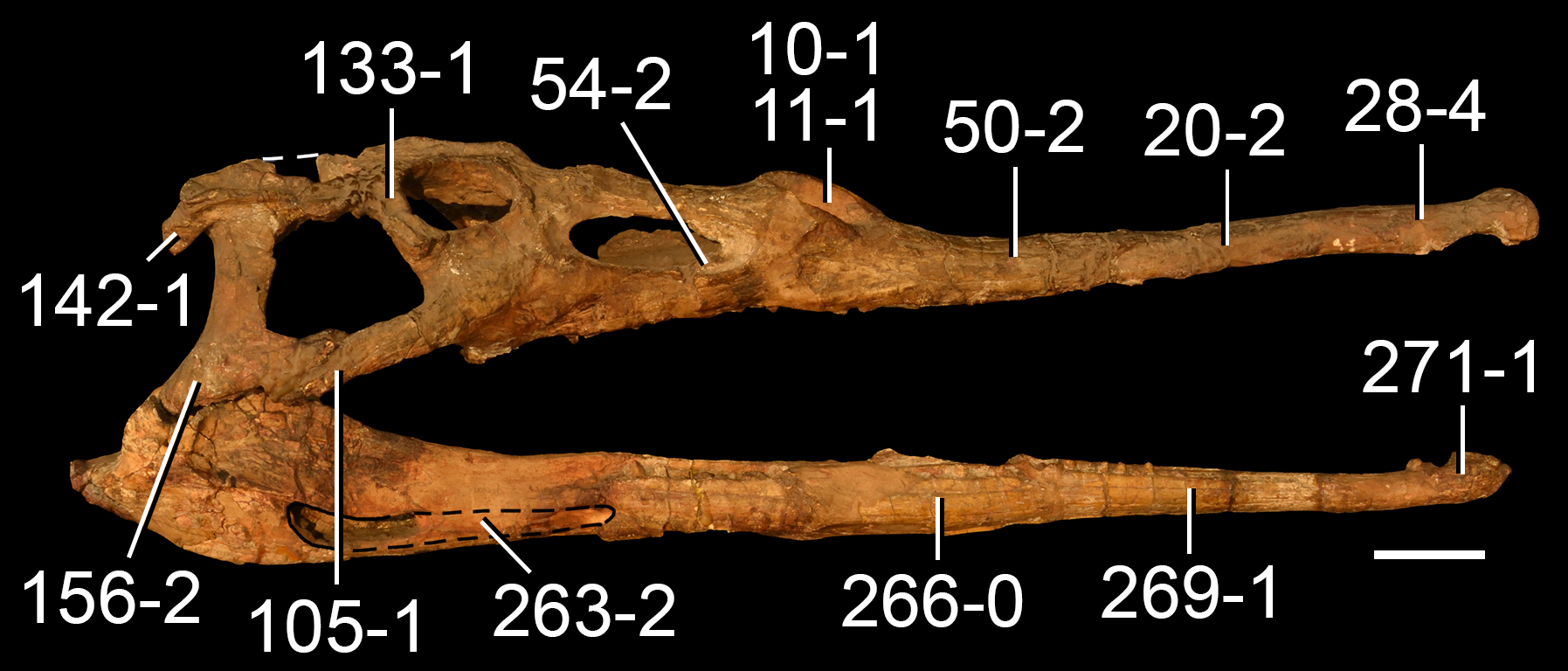
- The skull of ISI R42, the neotype of Parasuchus hislopi

Scientific classification
- Kingdom: Animalia
- Phylum: Chordata
- Class: Reptilia
- Order: †Phytosauria
- Family: †Parasuchidae
- Genus: †Parasuchus; Lydekker, 1885

Type species
- †Parasuchus hislopi Lydekker, 1885

= Parasuchus =

Parasuchus Temporal range: Late Triassic, 222.5–212 Ma

Extinct genus of reptiles

Parasuchus is an extinct genus of basal phytosaur known from the Late Triassic (late Carnian to early Norian stage) of Telangana and Madhya Pradesh, India. At its most restricted definition, Parasuchus contains a single species, Parasuchus hislopi. Parasuchus hislopi is one of several species belonging to a basal grade of phytosaurs, typified by the genus Paleorhinus. Historically, Paleorhinus has been known from better-described fossils, and many species have been lumped into that genus. Parasuchus hislopi, despite being described earlier than Paleorhinus, was considered an undiagnostic chimera until new neotype fossils were described in the late 1970s. Parasuchus hislopi and the two unambiguously valid species of Paleorhinus (P. bransoni and P. angustifrons) are all closely related; some authors have historically described them all under the species Paleorhinus, while others place the two Paleorhinus species into Parasuchus according to the principle of priority. The bite force of Parasuchus hislopi is estimated to be 450 newtons at the anterior portion of the jaw, with 1,958 newtons at the posterior portion.

== History ==
The name Parasuchus was first used by Thomas Henry Huxley (1870) in a faunal list. Since a diagnosis wasn't provided, it would have been considered a nomen nudum at the time. Richard Lydekker (1885) formally described and named P. hislopi, and proposed the family name Parasuchidae. However, Lydekker's description was based on a chimeric syntype, combining fossils from multiple unrelated reptiles: a rhynchosaurian basicranium mixed with the partial snout of a phytosaur, scutes and some teeth. Friedrich von Huene (1940) identified the basicranium as belonging to Paradapedon huxleyi (now known as Hyperodapedon huxleyi) and the phytosaurian material to a newly named species, "aff." Brachysuchus maleriensis. Later, Edwin Harris Colbert (1958) designated all the Indian parasuchian material as Phytosaurus maleriensis while Gregory (1962) considered the material undiagnostic.

Sankar Chatterjee (1978) described many complete remains of the Indian parasuchian and showed that it is not assignable either to Brachysuchus (which is closely related to or synonymous with Angistorhinus), or to Phytosaurus (a dubious name, probably the senior synonym of Nicrosaurus). He argued that the rhynchosaur basicranium qualifies as neither the holotype of P. hislopi, nor the lectotype of Paradapedon huxleyi. He re-introduced P. hislopi, based on Lydekker's snout fossil and new well-preserved material. To avoid additional confusion, the nondiagnostic holotype of P. hislopi was replaced by a neotype (ISI R 42) with approval from the ICZN (Opinion 2045) following the application of Chatterjee (2001).

=== Fossil material ===
The partial premaxillary rostrum (snout) originally described by Lydekker, GSI H 20/11, was chosen as the lectotype of Parasuchus hislopi by Sankar Chatterjee. GSI H 20/11 was collected from the Lower Maleri Formation (Pranhita–Godavari Basin), near the Maleri village of Adilabad district, Telangana. The lectotype was rendered obsolete when neotype fossils were approved for the genus in 2003.

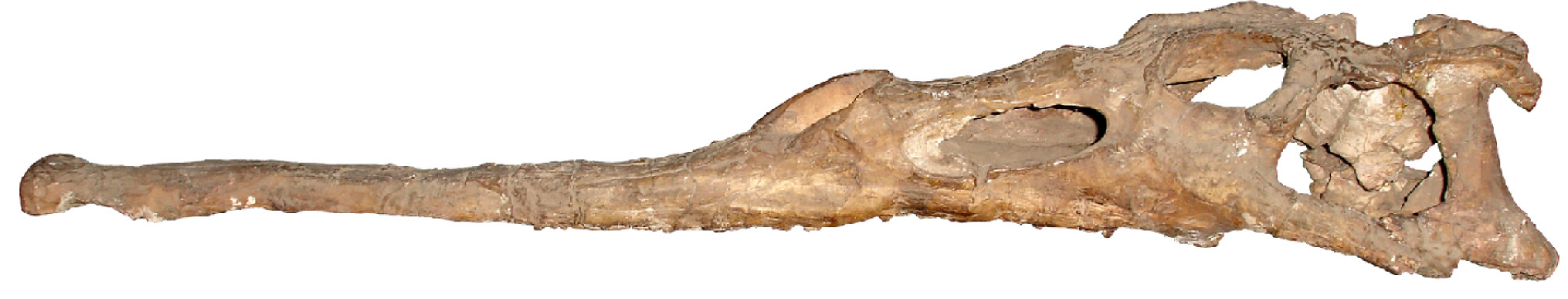
The neotype skull of Parasuchus hislopi (ISI R42)

Sankar Chatterjee later described more comprehensive remains from the Lower Maleri Formation, as well as one nearly complete skull form the Tiki Formation that he also assigned to Parasuchus hislopi. Two complete and articulated skeletons that include complete skulls were collected from the Lower Maleri Formation in the vicinity of the Mutapyram village of Adilabad district. Both individuals were roughly 8 ft (2.4 m) in length, lying side by side. The left individual, ISI R 42, is perfectly preserved, and was designated as the neotype of the species. The right individual, ISI R 43, is nearly complete and only missing part of the snout.

Two articulated and almost complete skeletons of Malerisaurus robinsonae (both designated as ISIR 150), an azendohsaurid archosauromorph, were found as presumable gastric contents of these two skeletons. From the same locality as the neotype, three isolated conjoined basioccipital/basisphenoids (ISI R 45-47) were also recovered. A couple of miles north of that locality, near the Venkatapur village, two more excellently preserved skulls were found. ISI R 160 represents an isolated but nearly complete skull, while ISI R 161 represents partial skull and articulated postcranial remains. Finally, a skull recovered from the Tikisuchus holotype site of the Tiki Formation (Gondwana Group), about 4 miles west of Tiki village of Shadol District, Madhya Pradesh, is missing only the end of the snout and the squamosal. As the lectotype of the genus, it was found nearby Paradapedon remains. Both formations date to the late Carnian to early Norian stage of the Late Triassic period, about 222.5-212 million years ago.

== Classification ==
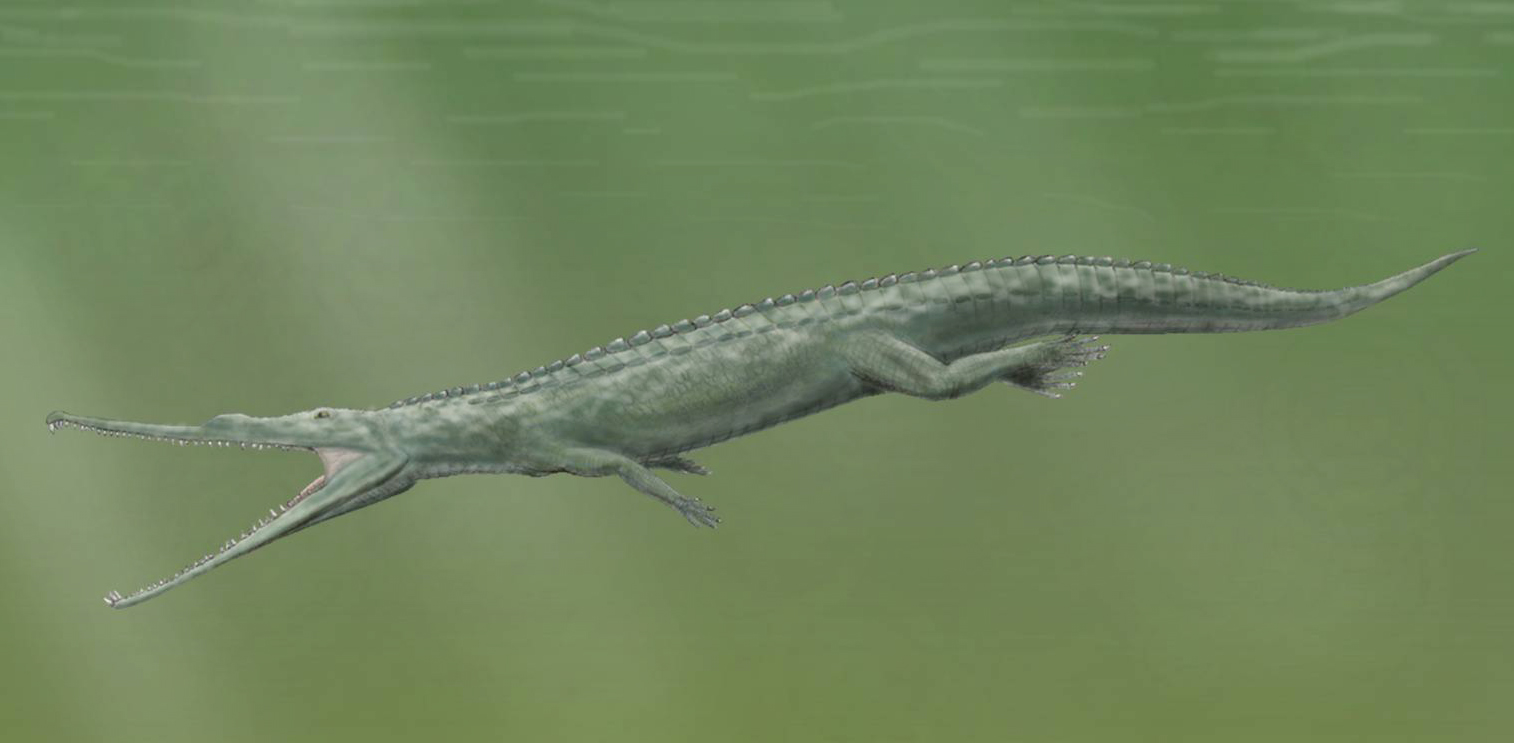
Paleorhinus cf. arenaceus, a Polish phytosaur species tentatively referred to the genus Paleorhinus. Paleorhinus is sometimes considered a junior synonym of Parasuchus, due to being described later

The two articulated skeletons, ISI R 42-43, alone represent the most complete phytosaurs known to date. Additionally, Parasuchus has been found as one of the most primitive phytosaurs in phylogenetic analyses of Phytosauria, making it very significant for understanding the origin of the Phytosauria. Some studies, like Chatterjee (1978) and Lucas et al. (2007), synonymized Parasuchus with another basal phytosaur, Paleorhinus. If this is the case, the name Parasuchus would have precedence over Paleorhinus because Paleorhinus was named in 1904, nineteen years after Parasuchus was named. A phylogenetic analysis conducted by Kammerer et al. (2016) confirmed that Parasuchus hislopi is nested within the least inclusive clade containing the species Paleorhinus bransoni and Paleorhinus angustifrons. The authors thus considered the genus Parasuchus to be a senior synonym of the genus Paleorhinus (as well as Arganarhinus), and referred the species Paleorhinus bransoni, Paleorhinus angustifrons and Arganarhinus magnoculus to the genus Parasuchus. The cladogram below follows Kammerer et al. (2016).

- Parasuchidae
  - Wannia scurriensis
  - - - Parasuchus (Paleorhinus) bransoni
      - - Parasuchus (Paleorhinus) angustifrons
        - Parasuchus hislopi
    - - Ebrachosuchus neukami
      - Mystriosuchinae
        - Angistorhinus
        - "Paleorhinus" sawini
        - Brachysuchus megalodon
        - - Protome batalaria
          - "Machaeroprosopus" zunii
          - Rutiodon carolinensis
          - Leptosuchomorpha
            - TMM 31173-120
            - "Phytosaurus" doughtyi
            - - - Smilosuchus lithodendrorum
                - - Smilosuchus gregorii
                  - Smilosuchus adamanensis
              - - Pravusuchus hortus
                - Mystriosuchini
                  - Machaeroprosopus mccauleyi
                  - - Machaeroprosopus pristinus
                    - - Machaeroprosopus jablonskiae
                      - Mystriosuchus westphali

== Etymology ==
Parasuchus was first described and named by Richard Lydekker in 1885 and the type species is Parasuchus hislopi. The generic name is derived from the Greek para/παρα meaning "beside" or "near" and suchus from the Greek souchos, which refers to the Egyptian crocodile-headed god Sobek. The specific name, hislopi, honors Hislop who drawn attention in 1854 to the red clays near Maleri village in which the holotype (and later the neotype and other specimens) of P. hislopi was recovered.
