= Primisuchus =

Primisuchus Temporal range: Upper Triassic (Norian), 224–215 Ma

Scientific classification
- Kingdom: Animalia
- Phylum: Chordata
- Class: Reptilia
- Order: †Phytosauria
- Family: †Parasuchidae
- Subfamily: †Mystriosuchinae
- Clade: †Leptosuchomorpha
- Genus: †Primisuchus; Datta et al, 2026
- Species: †P. gillettei

Binomial name
- †Primisuchus gillettei Datta et al., 2026

Primisuchus is an extinct genus of leptosuchomorph phytosaur from the early to mid Norian Upper Maleri Formation of India's Pranhita–Godavari Basin. The type species is Primisuchus gillettei. It is the first definitive leptosuchomorph from Indian subcontinent and the Gondwanaland overall, before this discovery leptosuchomorphs were mostly known from Triassic of Europe and North America.

== History and naming ==
The holotype of Primisuchus, ISIR270 a namely the incomplete skull(consisting of a rostrum, skull table and braincase), was recovered by the late Tharavat S. Kutty and subsequently housed at the Geology Museum of the Indian Statistical Institute in Kolkata. The specimen was recovered from the early to mid Norian sediments of the Upper Maleri Formation, from a fossil locality near Balapur which is located in the Pranhita–Godavari Basin of Telangana, India.

Later in 2026, Debajit Datta and colleagues described the specimen as a new genus and species of leptosuchomorph phytosaur, Primisuchus gillettei. The generic name combines the Latin "primis", meaning "first" (as it is the first leptosuchomorph from Indian subcontinent and Gondwana), with "suchus", derived from the Egyptian deity Sobek. The specific name honors David Gillette for his contributions to Indian vertebrate paleontology

== Description ==
Primisuchus is the first definitive leptosuchomorph phytosaur from Gondwanaland and Indian subcontinent. Like other leptosuchomorph phytosaurs, Primisuchus also has its nostrils close to the top of its head.

=== Skull ===
Primisuchus is known only from a partial skull, so the overall skull length is unknown. Its skull was robust and S-shaped, with a high ridge, the narial crest rising above it in front of the nostrils. The jugal reached unusually far forward unlike other phytosaurs, making it a unique trait, and the bones of the skull roof carried a pair of joined hollows with a deep pit behind them. The snout tip is rounded and slightly longer than it is wider.

== Classification ==
Phylogenetic analyses suggest that Primisuchus was a late-diverging member of the clade Leptosuchomorpha within Phytosauria, sitting just outside of the clade Mystriosuchini.

- Leptosuchomorpha
  - Smilosuchus
  - - - Leptosuchus
      - - "Smilosuchus" lithodendrorum
        - Pravusuchus
    - - Protome
      - - Primisuchus
        - Mystriosuchini
