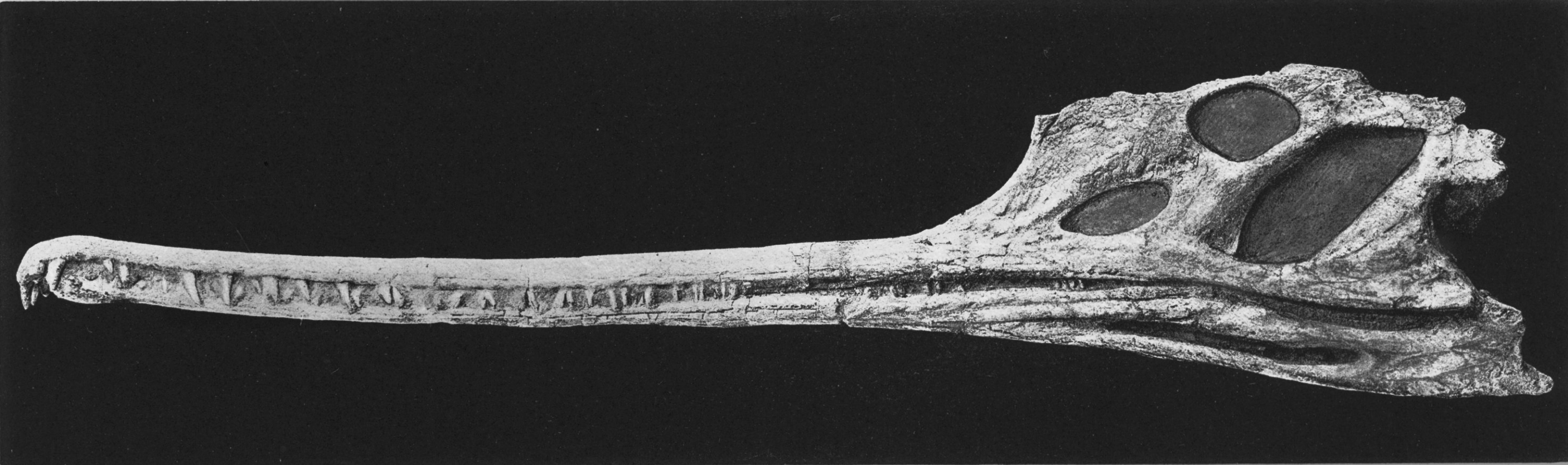
- Skull of M. planirostris
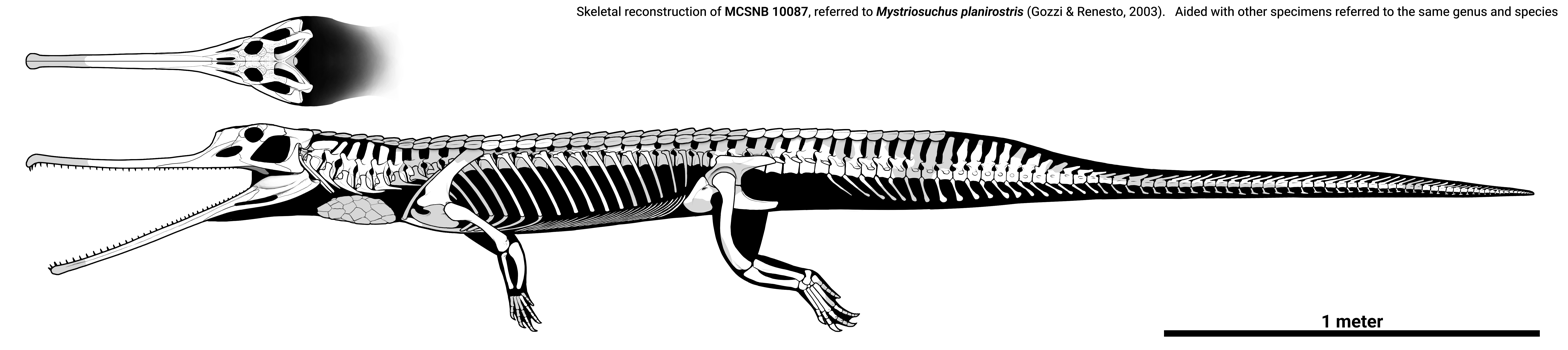

Scientific classification
- Kingdom: Animalia
- Phylum: Chordata
- Class: Reptilia
- Order: †Phytosauria
- Family: †Parasuchidae
- Subfamily: †Mystriosuchinae
- Tribe: †Mystriosuchini
- Genus: †Mystriosuchus; Fraas, 1896

Species
- †M. planirostris (von Meyer, 1863 [originally Belodon planirostris]) (type); †M. steinbergeri Butler et al., 2019; †M. westphali Hungerbuhler, 2000; †M. alleroq López-Rojas et al., 2023

= Mystriosuchus =

Mystriosuchus Temporal range: Late Triassic 228–212 Ma

Extinct genus of reptiles

Mystriosuchus (meaning "spoon-crocodile") is an extinct genus of phytosaur that lived in the Late Triassic (middle Norian) in Europe and Greenland. It was first named by Eberhard Fraas in 1896, and includes four species: M. planirostris (the type species), M. westphali, M. steinbergeri, and M. alleroq.

== Description ==
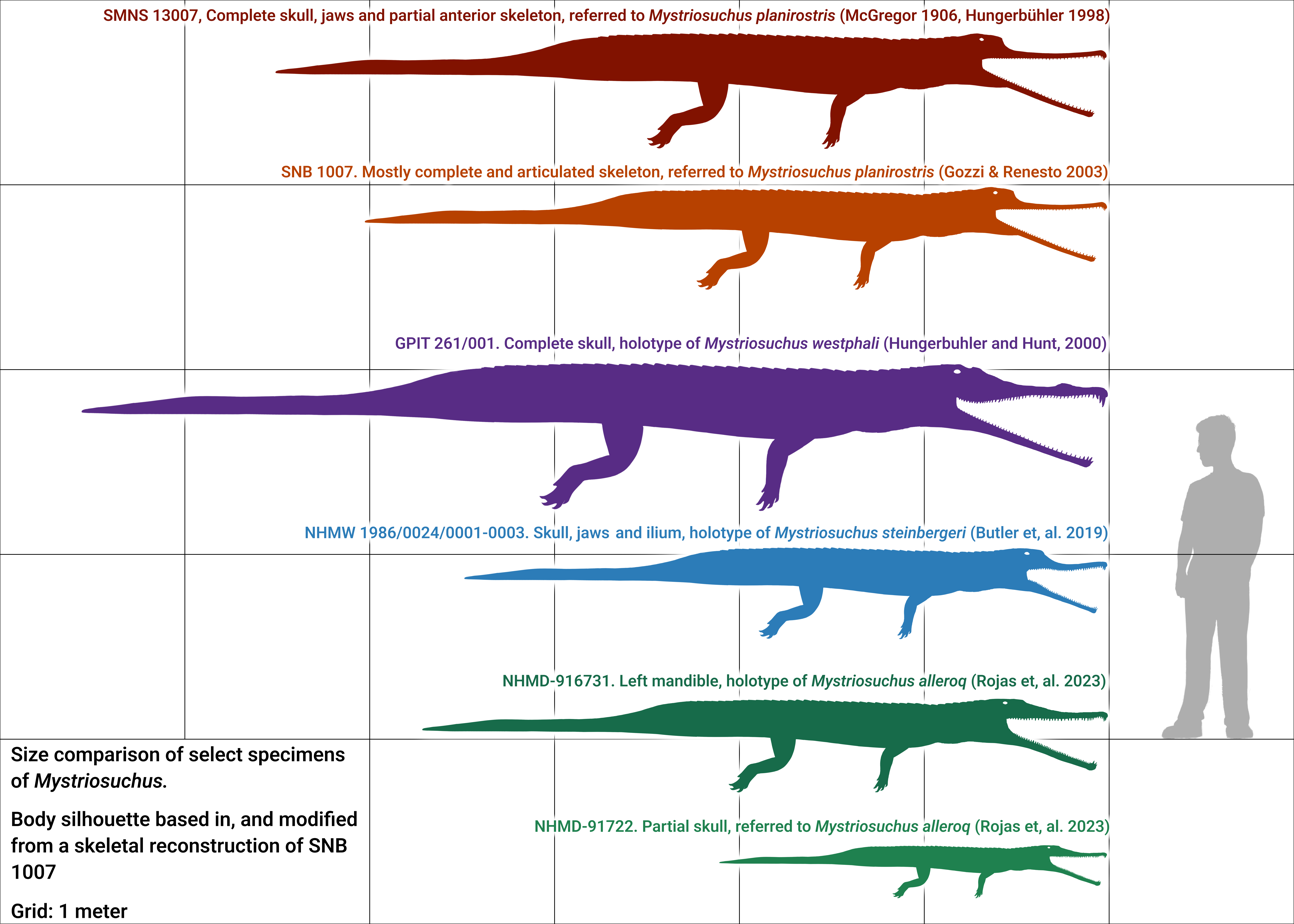
Size comparison of the different species

Mystriosuchus planirostris measured about 4 m (13 ft), according to a complete skeleton which was found in 1995. The postcranial anatomy of the skeleton suggests that Mystriosuchus was more adapted to aquatic life than other known phytosaurs, possessing shorter and more paddle-like limbs as well as just two type of osteoderms as opposed to the higher diversity of other phytosaurs. Cranial morphology is suggestive of a primarily fish eating diet, having long jaws like those of the modern gharials. Several specimens have been recovered from marine fossil sites. A study on phytosaur microwear shows a preference towards softer invertebrates.

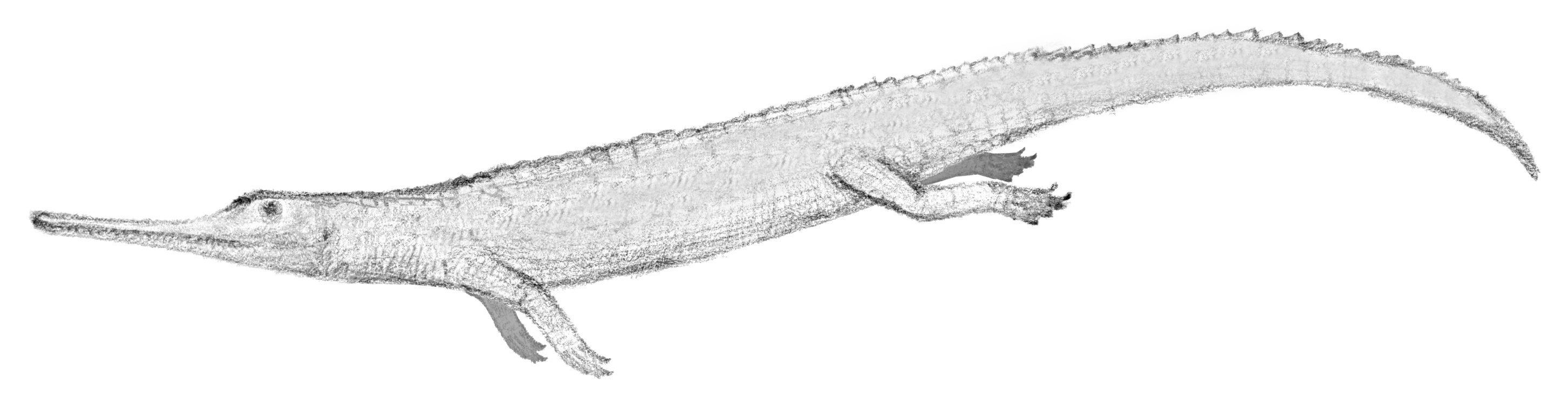
Restoration

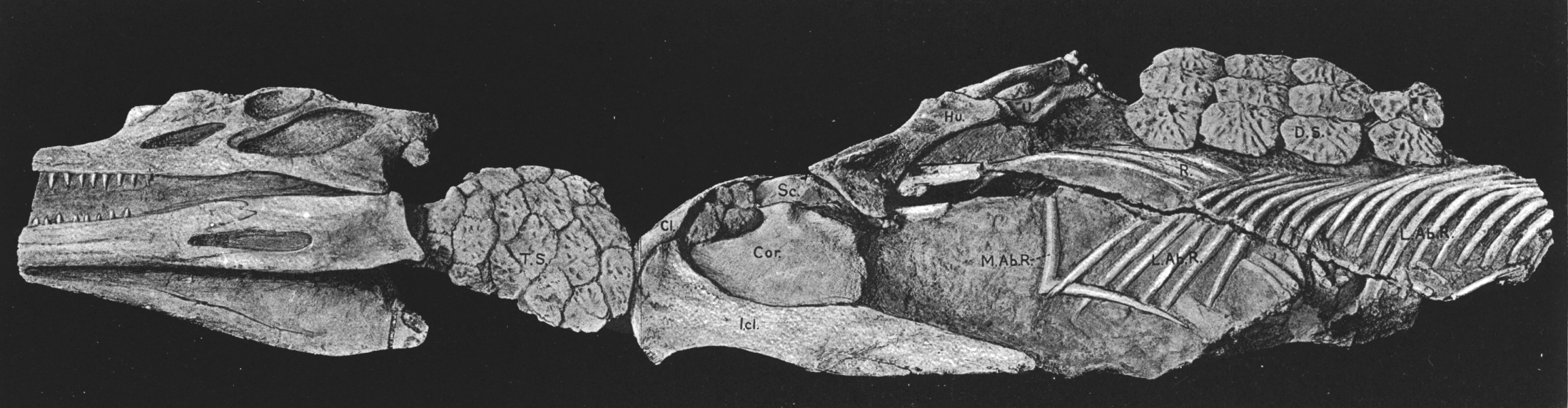
Partial skull and skeleton of M. planirostris

M. planirostris, as the name implies, has a rather "plain" snout, without osseous ornamentation or crests. M. westphali, on the other hand, has multiple bony crests along the upper jaw, most prominently at the base and tip of the snout. As keratinous crests are known in phytosaurs, it is possible that M. planirostris had soft tissue ornamentation.

=== Vertebrae ===
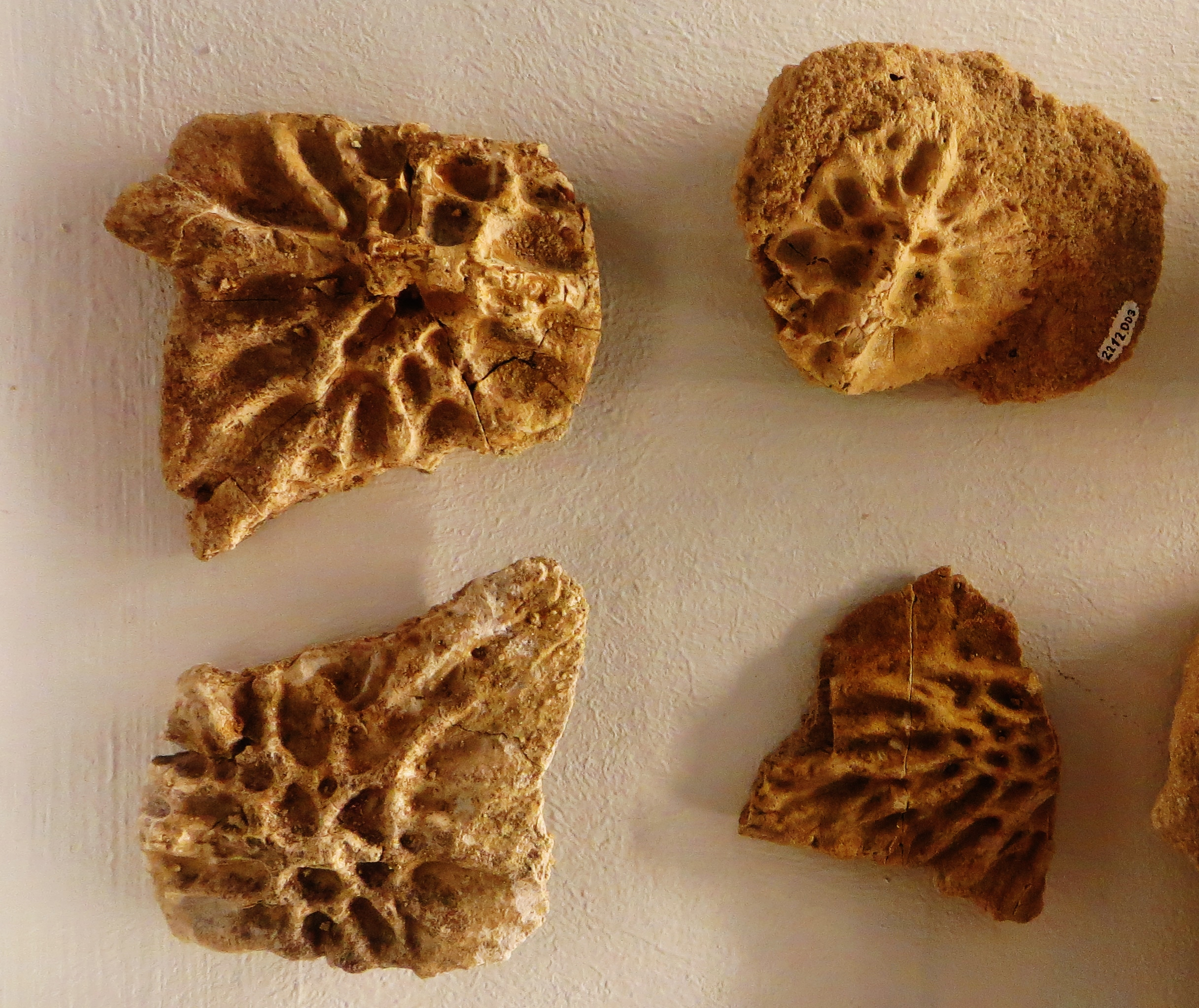
M. planirostris scutes

Mystriosuchus possesses many vertebrae, with 25 in the neck and torso, two in the pelvis, and 74 in the tail. The vertebral column is complete and nearly all articulated, although a portion of the tail can only be seen from top view. The vertebrae behind the axis vertebra are platycoelous (one surface flat and one concave), and are approximately rectangular in shape. Because of incomplete preservation, it can't be distinguished where the neck meets the torso, although at least 17 of the 25 vertebrae come from the latter. The trunk vertebrae are lower and wider than the neck vertebrae, but are still lightly built. The pelvic vertebrae have wide ribs which attach to the ilium (largest pelvis bone). The tail is longer than the rest of the body, being 51% of the total length of the taxon. The first 17 vertebrae of the tail are similar to those of the neck and trunk, being platycoelous and subrectangular. Chevrons are present after the fourth vertebra, but are only loosely attached for the beginning of the tail. At the end of the tail the vertebrae become more slanted, and the chevrons form an inverted 'T' shape, which is not seen in other phytosaurs but in sauropterygians or some crocodilians.

== Classification ==
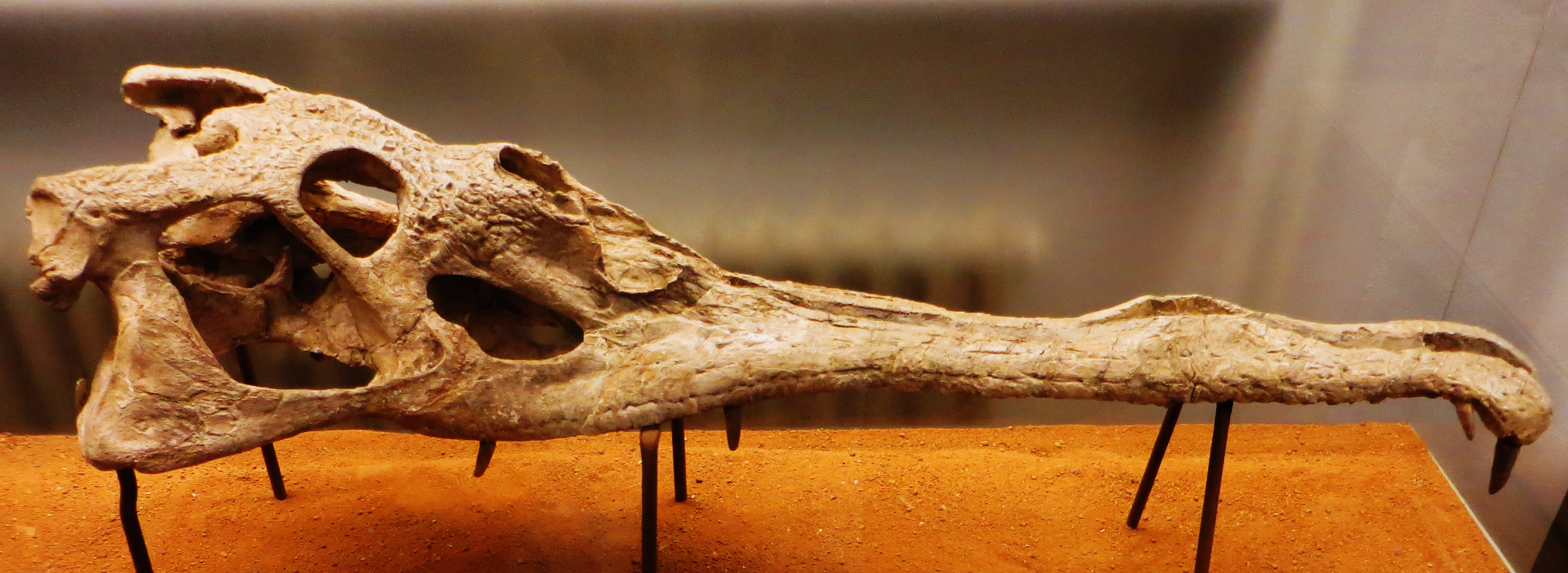
M. westphali skull

Mystriosuchus used to be placed in its own subfamily, Mystriosuchidae, but subsequent cladistic analysis grouped it with other members of Pseudopalatinae, despite having several physical differences from most of the genera in this group. Originally considered to be a freshwater genus, a recent specimen from Northern Italy has shown that some Mystriosuchus specimens lived a completely marine life. In their paper on Parasuchus, Christian Kammerer and colleagues noted that Mystriosuchini has priority over Pseudopalatinae, so synonymized Pseudopalatinae with Mystriosuchini.

Below is a cladogram from Stocker (2012):

- Phytosauria
  - Wannia scurriensis
  - - Paleorhinus bransoni
    - - "Paleorhinus" sawini
      - Phytosauridae
        - Brachysuchus megalodon
        - Angistorhinus
        - - Rutiodon carolinensis
          - "Machaeroprosopus" zunii
          - Protome batalaria
          - Leptosuchomorpha
            - "Phytosaurus" doughtyi
            - TMM 31173-120
            - - Leptosuchus crosbiensis
              - Leptosuchus studeri
            - - - Smilosuchus lithodendrorum
                - - Smilosuchus adamanensis
                  - Smilosuchus gregorii
              - - Pravusuchus hortus
                - Pseudopalatinae
                  - Machaeroprosopus mccauleyi
                  - - Mystriosuchus westphali
                    - Machaeroprosopus pristinus
