= Pravusuchus =

Pravusuchus Temporal range: Late Triassic, 228–209 Ma

Scientific classification
- Domain: Eukaryota
- Kingdom: Animalia
- Phylum: Chordata
- Class: Reptilia
- Clade: Archosauromorpha
- Clade: Archosauriformes
- Order: †Phytosauria
- Family: †Parasuchidae
- Clade: †Leptosuchomorpha
- Genus: †Pravusuchus; Stocker, 2010

Type species
- †Pravusuchus hortus Stocker, 2010

Extinct genus of reptiles

Pravusuchus is an extinct genus of leptosuchomorph parasuchid phytosaur known from the Late Triassic (Norian stage) of Arizona, United States. It contains a single species, Pravusuchus hortus, which is known from three specimens. These specimens were previously referred to Smilosuchus or to Leptosuchus, but Pravusuchus's autapomorphy, its phylogenetic position as well as a trait shared with mystriosuchins, justified the erection of a new taxon for the material.

== Discovery and naming ==
Pravusuchus was first described and named by Michelle R. Stocker in 2010 and the type species is Pravusuchus hortus. The generic name is derived from Latin, pravus, "evil" or "wicked", and Greek, souchus, for the Egyptian crocodile-headed god Sobek. The specific name, hortus, is the Latin word for park or grounds. The name refers to Devil's Playground, the locality in Petrified Forest National Park from which all specimens of this taxon were collected. Pravusuchus is known from the holotype AMNH FR 30646, mostly complete but partially disarticulated skull, and from the referred specimens PEFO 31218, a partial skull, and PEFO 34239, partial skull, partial mandible, and possible partial postcrania. Although the holotype is slightly crushed dorsoventrally, it is not as flattened as PEFO 31218. All specimens referable to Pravusuchus were collected from the Sonsela Sandstone Bed (later referred to as Jasper / Rainbow Forest Bed) of the Norian-aged Sonsela Member, Chinle Formation from Navajo County, Arizona. PEFO 31218 and PEFO 34239 were found in the same stratigraphic horizon just west of Colbert's 1946 locality where AMNH FR 30646 was collected, and only 2–3 m higher stratigraphically than the holotype. Other phytosaur specimens from the Sonsela Member occur in other beds, stratigraphically lower (e.g. Protome batalaria, Smilosuchus adamanensis and S. lithodendrorum) or higher (e.g. Machaeroprosopus jablonskiae and M. pristinus) then the white Rainbow Forest sandstone.

== Description ==
Stocker (2010) diagnosed Pravusuchus hortus by a single unambiguous autapomorphy (unique trait) and additionally by a unique combination of characters. Unlike all other phytosaurs, the lateral rim of its external naris (i.e. nostril) is formed by the "septomaxilla", and not by the nasal bone. The element in phytosaur skulls anterior to the external nares, located between the nasal, maxilla and premaxilla, has traditionally been referred to as the septomaxilla, however it probably is not homologous to the septomaxillae of squamates and synapsids.

The antorbital fossa is absent in Pravusuchus, as in Pseudopalatus, Smilosuchus gregorii and S. adamanensis, however, unlike Pseudopalatus its interpremaxillary fossa (a depression on the premaxilla) is broad and rounded. In Pravusuchus, alveolar ridges visible in lateral view (from the sides), unlike the condition in S. gregorii and Pseudopalatus. Its rostrum is partially crested, as in Leptosuchus crosbiensis, L. studeri and S. adamanensis, but it lacks a premaxillary crest, as also seen in Protome, Smilosuchus and L. crosbiensis. Pravusuchus shares with Pseudopalatus, L. crosbiensis and L. studeri the presence of a long posterior process of the squamosal, unlike the condition seen in S. gregorii and S. adamanensis. However, in contrast to the condition in Pseudopalatus, it is also greatly dorsoventrally expanded and rounded posteriorly as in Rutiodon, Protome, Leptosuchus, Smilosuchus and "Phytosaurus" doughtyi. As in "Machaeroprosopus" zunii, Protome, Smilosuchus and Pseudopalatus, Pravusuchus has basitubera, in front of the attachment point between the skull and the neck, that are connected and form a sharp ridge along their anterior border. Its supratemporal fenestrae (upper temporal openings) partially depressed as in Rutiodon, Leptosuchus and S. gregorii, in contrast to the condition in Pseudopalatus, and are mostly visible in dorsal view as in Smilosuchus. In contrast to all other phytosaurs, Pravusuchus shares the presence of a subsidiary opisthotic process of the squamosal with Mystriosuchini, a possible synapomorphy.

== Phylogeny ==
To test the evolutionary relationships of Pravusuchus, Stocker (2010) performed the most inclusive phylogenetic analysis of Phytosauria up to that time. Pravusuchus was coded in the analysis using solely its holotype, as both referred specimen had identical codings for applicable characters. The analysis placed Pravusuchus outside the clade containing species of Mystriosuchus and Pseudopalatus (now Machaeroprosopus), suggesting that it is the sister taxon of Mystriosuchini. However, to confirm its exclusion from Mystriosuchini, Nicrosaurus kapffi must be included in the analysis, as Mystriosuchini is a node-based taxon and Nicrosaurus usually occupies the most basal position in it. Furthermore, Pravusuchus was found to occupy a more derived position then Leptosuchus and even Smilosuchus. This justified the erection of a new genus and species for Pravusuchus, as its holotype was previously referred to these genera. Below is a cladogram showing the phylogenetic relationships of Pravusuchus from Stocker (2010) which was also recovered in Stocker (2012):

- Phytosauria
  - "Paleorhinus" scurriensis
  - - Paleorhinus bransoni
    - - "Paleorhinus" sawini
      - Phytosauridae
        - Brachysuchus megalodon
        - Angistorhinus
        - - Rutiodon carolinensis
          - "Machaeroprosopus" zunii
          - Protome batalaria
          - Leptosuchomorpha
            - "Phytosaurus" doughtyi
            - TMM 31173-120
            - - Leptosuchus crosbiensis
              - Leptosuchus studeri
            - - - Smilosuchus lithodendrorum
                - - Smilosuchus adamanensis
                  - Smilosuchus gregorii
              - - Pravusuchus hortus
                - Pseudopalatinae
                  - Pseudopalatus mccauleyi
                  - - Mystriosuchus westphali
                    - Pseudopalatus pristinus
