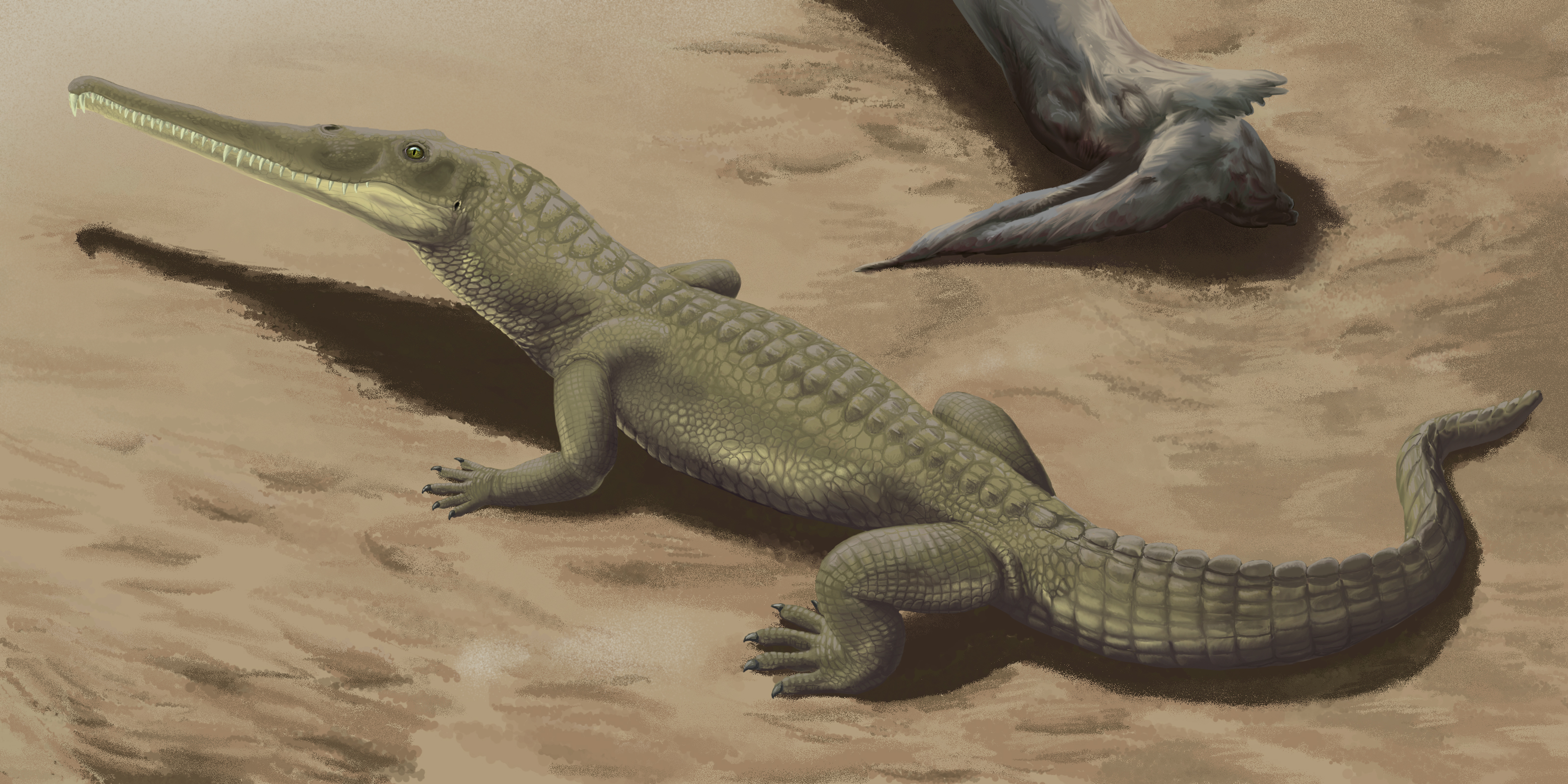
- Life restoration of Protome batalaria

Scientific classification
- Domain: Eukaryota
- Kingdom: Animalia
- Phylum: Chordata
- Class: Reptilia
- Clade: Archosauromorpha
- Clade: Archosauriformes
- Order: †Phytosauria
- Family: †Parasuchidae
- Genus: †Protome; Stocker, 2012
- Species: †P. batalaria

Binomial name
- †Protome batalaria Stocker, 2012

= Protome batalaria =

Protome batalaria Temporal range: Late Triassic, 221.5–205.6 Ma

Extinct genus of reptiles

Protome is an extinct genus of parasuchid phytosaur from the Late Triassic of Arizona, represented by a single species, Protome batalaria. It is known from a single holotype incomplete, partially disarticulated skull and left lower jaw called PEFO 34034 from the Upper Lot's Wife beds, Sonsela Member of the Chinle Formation in Petrified Forest National Park. The skull was discovered in 2004 by Michelle Stocker and Bill Parker and was described by them as a specimen of Smilosuchus adamanensis (then a species of Leptosuchus). It was placed in the new genus Protome in 2012. The genus name Protome is the Greek word for an animal's face. The specific name batalaria is the Latin word for battleship, which is a reference to Battleship NW, the locality within Petrified Forest where the skull was found.

== Description ==
Protome has a long, narrow, tubular-shaped snout. It has a partial rostral crest at the back of the snout, a feature which it shares with phytosaurs like Smilosuchus adamanensis, Pravusuchus, and Leptosuchus, but which is not as prominent as it is in other Smilosuchus species and some Pseudopalatus species. It lacks the premaxillary crest along the midline of the snout that is present in Leptosuchus studeri and Mystriosuchus westphali. Many characteristics that associate Protome with other phytosaurs can be found in its squamosal bone, which makes up the cheek region and extends behind the main portion of the skull.

Protome was named on the basis of several unique characteristics, or autapomorphies. The first autapomorphy is the flat shape of the basitubera, an area at the base of the skull in front of its attachment point with the neck. Another is that bony projections called exoccipital prongs at the back of the skull make up the top margin of the foramen magnum, the hole through which the spinal cord enters the skull. A third autapomorphy is a small depression or fossa surrounding the front tip of a hole in the lower jaw called the mandibular fenestra. These features were used to distinguish PEFO 34034 as a new genus and species, distinct from Leptosuchus adamanensis. Protome and Leptosuchus are similar in that both have broad squamosals and holes called supratemporal fenestrae that are located on top of the skull.

When it was described in 2004, PEFO 34034 was thought to represent a small Leptosuchus individual, possibly a juvenile. The lack of a premaxillary crest has been used as evidence for it being a juvenile, although the absence of a crest has also been interpreted as a distinct characteristic of some species, and more recently as a possible characteristic of sexual dimorphism. Most juvenile phytosaurs are identified on the basis of incomplete fusion of different parts of each vertebra, but Protome is not known from any postcranial remains.

== Phylogeny ==
When Protome was named in 2012, a phylogenetic analysis was conducted to determine its evolutionary relationships. The analysis placed PEFO 34034 outside the clades containing species of Leptosuchus and Smilosuchus, the two most likely genera to which the specimen could be referred. PEFO 34034's placement outside these groups justified the erection of a new genus and species. Protome was found to be a phytosaurid just outside the clade Leptosuchomorpha. As was the case in previous studies, species of Leptosuchus formed a paraphyletic grouping, meaning that they did not represent one coherent genus. Many isolated phytosaur skull fragments from Petrified Forest have been assigned to Leptosuchus because they had broad squamosals, but the presence of this type of squamosal in the distinct taxon Protome suggests that not all of these fragments can be assigned with confidence to Leptosuchus. Below is a cladogram showing the phylogenetic relationships of Protome from Stocker (2012):

- Phytosauria
  - "Paleorhinus" scurriensis
  - - Paleorhinus bransoni
    - - "Paleorhinus" sawini
      - Phytosauridae
        - Brachysuchus megalodon
        - Angistorhinus
        - - Rutiodon carolinensis
          - "Machaeroprosopus" zunii
          - Protome batalaria
          - Leptosuchomorpha
            - "Phytosaurus" doughtyi
            - TMM 31173-120
            - - Leptosuchus crosbiensis
              - Leptosuchus studeri
            - - - Smilosuchus lithodendrorum
                - - Smilosuchus adamanensis
                  - Smilosuchus gregorii
              - - Pravusuchus hortus
                - Pseudopalatinae
                  - Pseudopalatus mccauleyi
                  - - Mystriosuchus westphali
                    - Pseudopalatus pristinus
