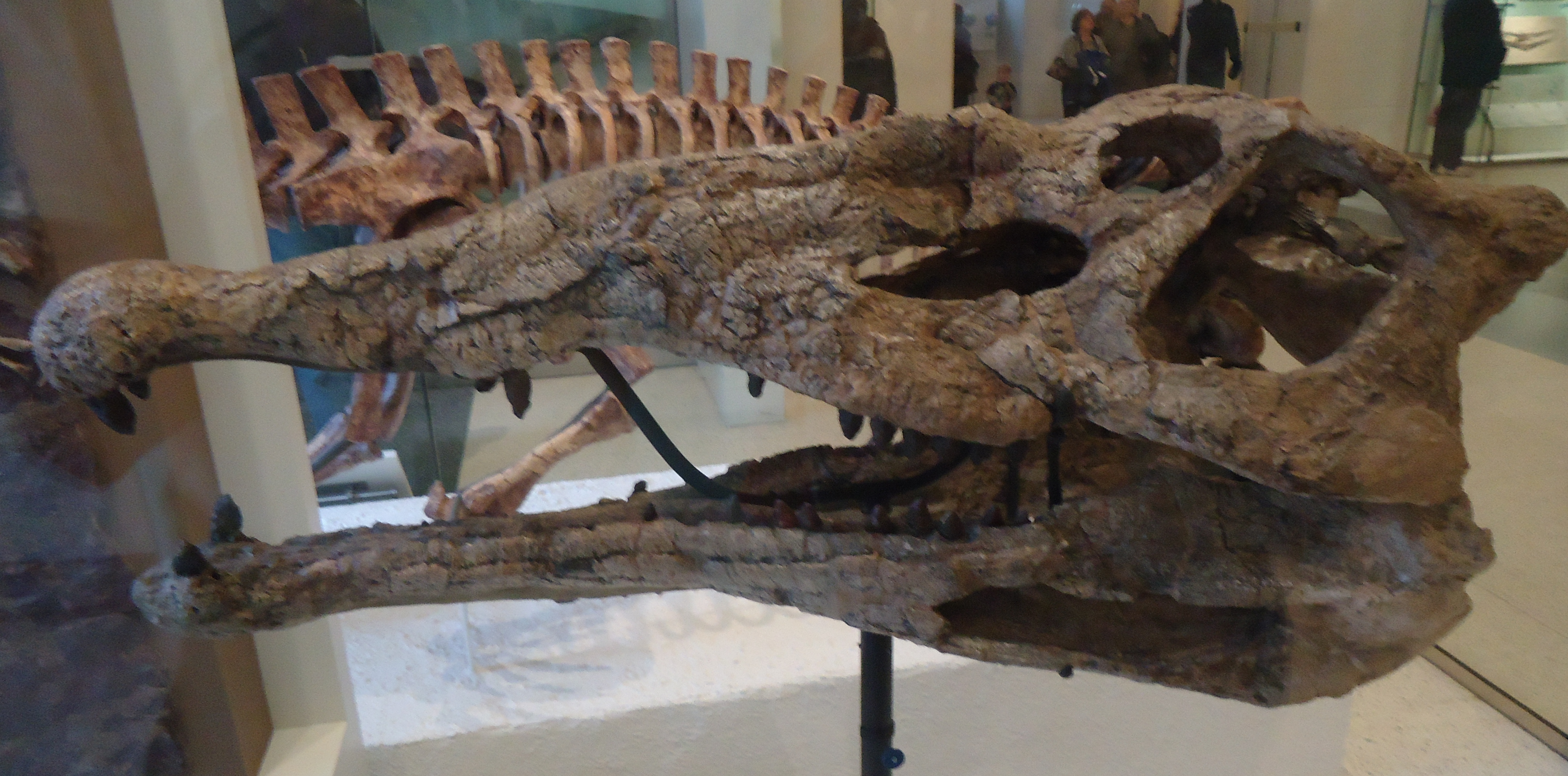
- Skull of Smilosuchus gregorii in the American Museum of Natural History

Scientific classification
- Kingdom: Animalia
- Phylum: Chordata
- Class: Reptilia
- Order: †Phytosauria
- Family: †Parasuchidae
- Subfamily: †Mystriosuchinae
- Clade: †Leptosuchomorpha; Stocker, 2010

Subgroups
- †Leptosuchus; †Pravusuchus; †Primisuchus; †Smilosuchus; †Mystriosuchini

= Leptosuchomorpha =

Leptosuchomorpha Temporal range: Late Triassic 237–201.4 Ma

Extinct clade of reptiles

Leptosuchomorpha is a clade of phytosaurs. It is a node-based taxon defined by Michelle R. Stocker in 2010 as the last common ancestor of Leptosuchus studeri and Pseudopalatus pristinus and all of its descendants. A new definition was proposed by Andrew S. Jones and Richard J. Butler in 2018 as the last common ancestor and all descendants of Smilosuchus lithodendrorum, Leptosuchus studeri, and Machaeroprosopus pristinus to reflect the new interrelationships of Phytosauria they recovered.

== Phylogeny ==
Below is a cladogram from Stocker (2012):

- Phytosauria
  - "Paleorhinus" scurriensis
  - - Paleorhinus bransoni
    - - "Paleorhinus" sawini
      - Phytosauridae
        - Brachysuchus megalodon
        - Angistorhinus
        - - Rutiodon carolinensis
          - "Machaeroprosopus" zunii
          - Protome batalaria
          - Leptosuchomorpha
            - "Phytosaurus" doughtyi
            - TMM 31173-120
            - - Leptosuchus crosbiensis
              - Leptosuchus studeri
            - - - Smilosuchus lithodendrorum
                - - Smilosuchus adamanensis
                  - Smilosuchus gregorii
              - - Pravusuchus hortus
                - Pseudopalatinae
                  - Pseudopalatus mccauleyi
                  - - Mystriosuchus westphali
                    - Pseudopalatus pristinus
