= Coburgosuchus =

Coburgosuchus Temporal range: Late Triassic 221.5–205.6 Ma

Scientific classification
- Domain: Eukaryota
- Kingdom: Animalia
- Phylum: Chordata
- Class: Reptilia
- Clade: Archosauromorpha
- Clade: Archosauriformes
- Order: †Phytosauria
- Family: †Parasuchidae
- Tribe: †Mystriosuchini
- Genus: †Coburgosuchus; Heller, 1954

Species
- C. goeckili Heller, 1954 (type)

Extinct genus of reptiles

Coburgosuchus is an extinct genus of mystriosuchin phytosaur. The genus was named for Coburg, Germany, the type locality where specimens have been found dating back to the Late Triassic. It has at times been considered a nomen dubium due to the fragmentary nature of the material associated with the genus, and it may prove to be synonymous with other phytosaurs such as Nicrosaurus or Phytosaurus.
