= 1922 in paleontology =

Paleontology or palaeontology is the study of prehistoric life forms on Earth through the examination of plant and animal fossils. This includes the study of body fossils, tracks (ichnites), burrows, cast-off parts, fossilised feces (coprolites), palynomorphs and chemical residues. Because humans have encountered fossils for millennia, paleontology has a long history both before and after becoming formalized as a science. This article records significant discoveries and events related to paleontology that occurred or were published in the year 1922.

== Arthropods ==
=== Crustaceans ===
Name	Novelty	Status	Authors	Age	Unit	Location	Notes	Images
Anthracomysis	Gen. et sp. nov	Jr synonym	van Straelen	Westphalian		Belgium	Type species is A. rostrata, junior synonym of Gorgonophontes fraiponti.	
Palaeocaris lohesti	Sp. nov	Jr synonym	van Straelen	Westphalian		Belgium	Junior synonym of Gorgonophontes fraiponti.	
Perimecturus fraiponti	Sp. nov	Jr synonym	van Straelen	Westphalian		Belgium	Junior synonym of Gorgonophontes fraiponti.	

=== Insects ===
Name	Novelty	Status	Authors	Age	Unit	Location	Notes	Images
Hydriomena? protrita	sp. nov	valid	Cockerell	Priabonian	Florissant Formation	USA	A geometrid moth	Hydriomena? protrita holotype

== Archosauromorphs ==
=== Newly named phytosaurs ===
Name	Status	Authors	Age	Unit	Location	Notes	Images
Angistorhinopsis	Nomen dubium	Friedrich von Huene	Late Triassic (Rhaetian)	Knollenmergel	Switzerland	A member of Pseudopalatinae.	
Leptosuchus	Valid taxon	Case	Late Triassic (early Norian)	Tecovas Formation	United States (Texas)	A basal member of Leptosuchomorpha.	
Promystriosuchus	Valid taxon	Case	Late Triassic (early Norian)	Tecovas Formation	United States (Texas)	A basal phytosaur	

=== Dinosaurs ===
- Krausel reported fossil gut contents from an Edmontosaurus annectens mummy. He described the material as including conifer needles and branches, deciduous foliage, and possible small seeds or fruit.
- Abel argued that the plant material Krausel argues was the fossilized remains of the gut contents of an Edmontosaurus annectens was actually deposited by flowing water.

==== New taxa ====
Taxon	Novelty	Status	Author(s)	Age	Unit	Location	Notes	Images
Alamosaurus sanjuanensis	Gen. et sp. nov.	Valid	Gilmore	Maastrichtian	Ojo Alamo Formation	USA; Texas	A North American titanosaur	
Dromaeosaurus albertensis	Gen. et sp. nov.	Valid	Matthew & Brown	Campanian	Dinosaur Park Formation	Canada; Alberta	A dromaeosaurid	
Erectopus superbus	Gen. et sp. nov	Valid	Huene	Albian	Phosphate-bearing beds of La Penthèive (Mammilatum Zone)	France	A metriacanthosaurid	
Parasaurolophus walkeri	Gen. et sp. nov.	Valid	Parks	Campanian	Dinosaur Park Formation	Canada; Alberta	A hadrosaurid	

== Plesiosaurs ==
=== New taxa ===
Name	Status	Authors	Age	Unit	Location	Notes	Images
Eurycleidus	Valid	Andrews	Hettangian-Sinemurian	Lower Lias	UK	A rhomaleosaurid. A new genus for "Plesiosaurus" arcuatus Owen (1840)	
Leptocleidus	Valid	Andrews	Barremian	Weald Clay	Australia; South Africa; UK	A leptocleidid.	Leptocleidus

== Synapsids ==
=== Non-mammalian ===
Name	Status	Authors	Age	Location	Notes	Images
Dvinia	Valid	Amalitski	255 Millions of years ago	Russia		
Eosimops	Valid	Broom	257 Millions of years ago	South Africa		
Oligokyphus	Valid	Hennig	198 Millions of years ago.	Germany; China; UK; USA (Arizona)	The Last North American Cynodont.	Oligokyphus
Venyukovia	Valid	Amalitski	264 Millions of years ago.	Russia		Venyukovia
