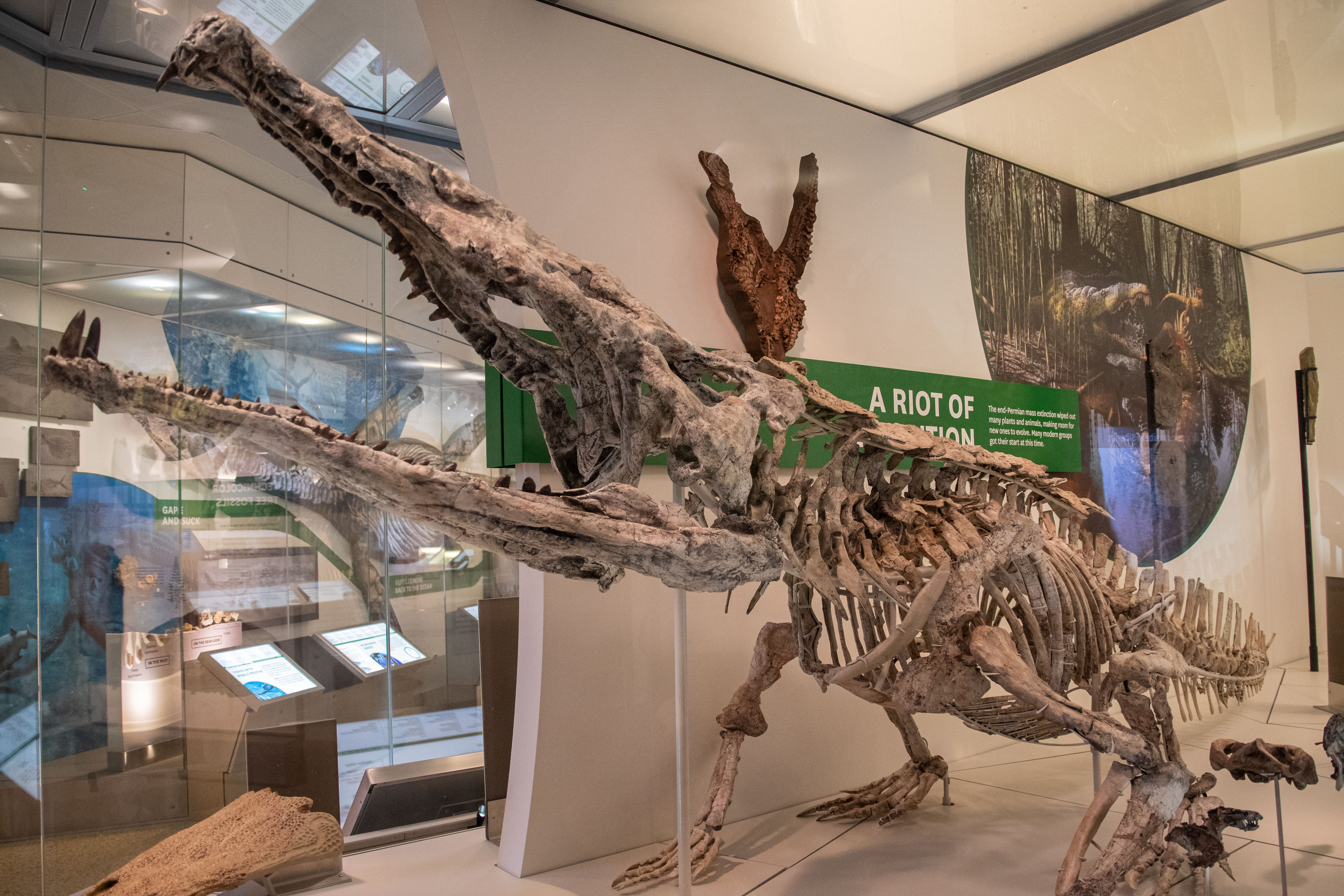
- Skeleton of S. gregorii (USNM 18313) on display at the National Museum of Natural History

Scientific classification
- Kingdom: Animalia
- Phylum: Chordata
- Class: Reptilia
- Order: †Phytosauria
- Family: †Parasuchidae
- Subfamily: †Mystriosuchinae
- Clade: †Leptosuchomorpha
- Genus: †Smilosuchus; Long & Murry, 1995

Type species
- †Machaeroprosopus gregorii Camp, 1930

Species
- †S. adamanensis (Camp, 1930); †S. gregorii (Camp, 1930); †S. lithodendrorum (Camp, 1930)

Synonyms
- Synonyms of S. adamanensis: Machaeroprosopus adamanensis Camp, 1930; Rutiodon adamanensis (Gregory, 1962); Leptosuchus adamanensis (Long & Murry, 1995); Synonyms of S. gregorii: Machaeroprosopus gregorii Camp, 1930; Phytosaurus gregorii (Gregory, 1962); Nicrosaurus gregorii (Gregory, 1962); Rutiodon gregorii (Ballew 1989); Leptosuchus gregorii (Irmis, 2005); Synonyms of S. lithodendrorum: Machaeroprosopus lithodendrorum Camp, 1930; Rutiodon adamanensis (Gregory, 1962)

= Smilosuchus =

Smilosuchus Temporal range: Late Triassic, 221.5–205.6 Ma

Extinct genus of reptiles

Smilosuchus (from Ancient Greek σμίλη (smílē), meaning "knife, chisel", and Σοῦχος (Soûkhos), meaning "Sobek") is an extinct genus of leptosuchomorph parasuchid phytosaurs from the Late Triassic of North America. Three species have been named: the type species S. gregorii, S. adamanensis, and S. lithodendrorum, all recovered from the Norian-aged Chinle Formation of Arizona.

== History ==
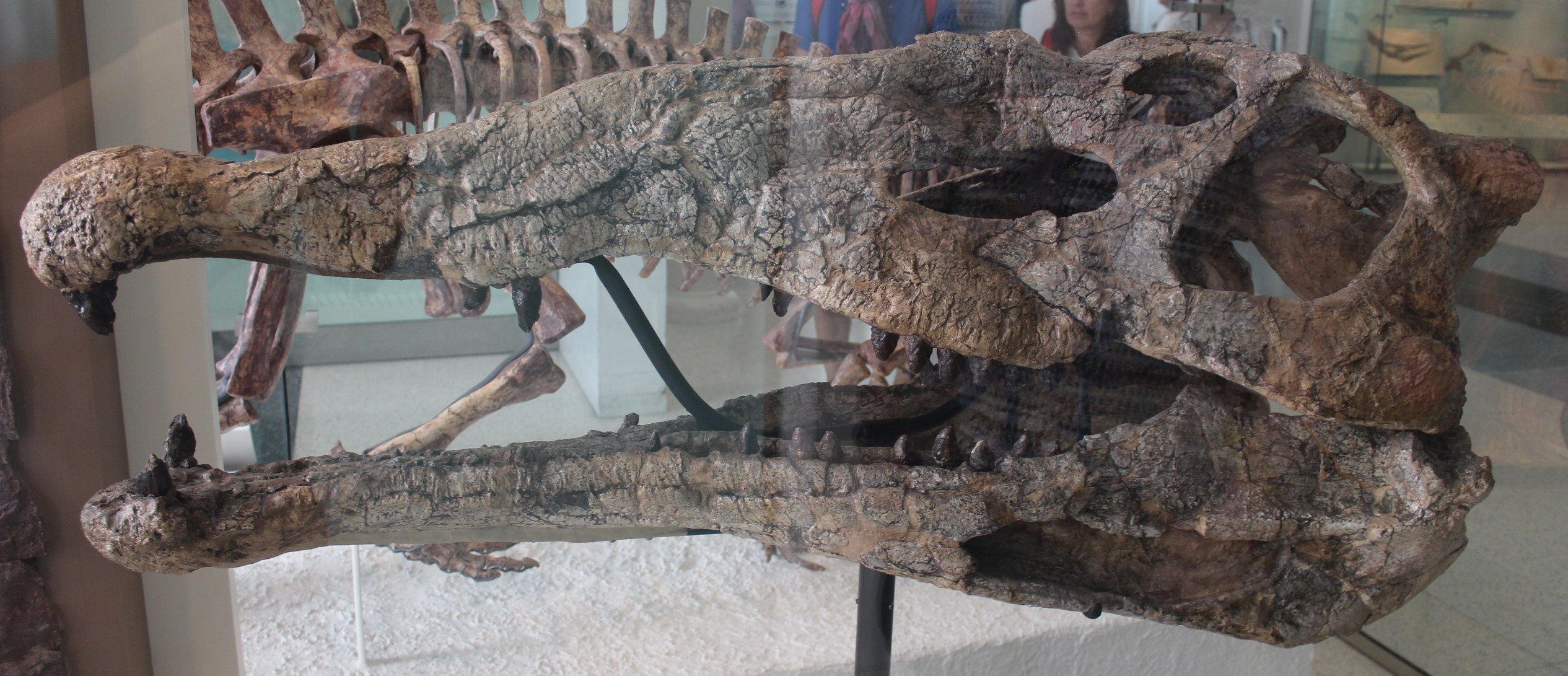
Skull of S. gregorii (AMNH FR-3060) on display at the American Museum of Natural History

The type species was first described in 1995 as a replacement generic name for Leptosuchus gregorii. Because of the large rostral crest it possessed, it was considered to be distinct enough from other species of Leptosuchus (all of which had smaller and more restricted crests) to be within its own genus. Some studies seem to suggest that Smilosuchus is congeneric with Leptosuchus, as the enlarged crest could have been independently developed in Leptosuchus. However, newer studies support the idea that Smilosuchus is distinct from the type species of Leptosuchus, Leptosuchus crosbiensis. Phylogenetic analyses suggest that Smilosuchus is more closely related to mystriosuchins than to Leptosuchus species.

== Description ==
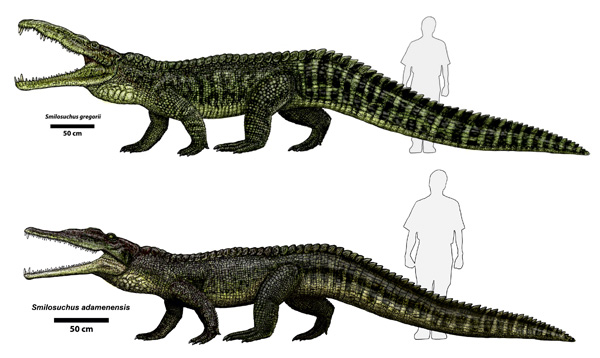
S. gregorii and S. adamanensis compared to a human

Like all phytosaurs, Smilosuchus had the nostrils close to the top of its head. The rostral crest and nasal bulge supporting these raised nostrils was larger in Smilosuchus than in many other phytosaurs. Its skull was extremely large, up to 155 cm long, although estimates for the overall length vary from 7 m (23 ft) The jaws are very short and broad and the teeth are heterodont, with large tusks at the anterior of the mouth for impaling prey and more blade-like teeth for slicing flesh closer to the back of the mouth. The tusks are mounted on a bulge at the tip of the snout present in nearly all phytosaurs. Its squamosal processes are short and deep, indicating a powerful bite. This coupled with its large size (it is one of the largest known phytosaurs) suggests that it hunted large prey such as Placerias.

== Phylogeny ==
Below is a cladogram from Stocker (2012):

- Phytosauria
  - "Paleorhinus" scurriensis
  - - Paleorhinus bransoni
    - - "Paleorhinus" sawini
      - Phytosauridae
        - Brachysuchus megalodon
        - Angistorhinus
        - - Rutiodon carolinensis
          - "Machaeroprosopus" zunii
          - Protome batalaria
          - Leptosuchomorpha
            - "Phytosaurus" doughtyi
            - TMM 31173-120
            - - Leptosuchus crosbiensis
              - Leptosuchus studeri
            - - - Smilosuchus lithodendrorum
                - - Smilosuchus adamanensis
                  - Smilosuchus gregorii
              - - Pravusuchus hortus
                - Pseudopalatinae
                  - Pseudopalatus mccauleyi
                  - - Mystriosuchus westphali
                    - Pseudopalatus pristinus
