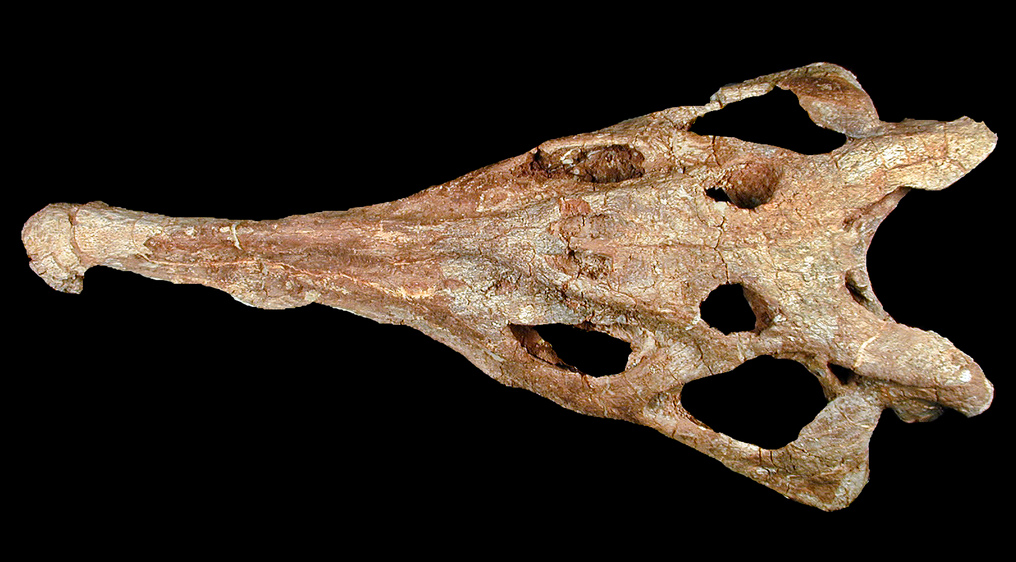
- Skull of Machaeroprosopus mccauleyi

Scientific classification
- Kingdom: Animalia
- Phylum: Chordata
- Class: Reptilia
- Order: †Phytosauria
- Family: †Parasuchidae
- Subfamily: †Mystriosuchinae
- Clade: †Leptosuchomorpha
- Tribe: †Mystriosuchini

Genera
- †Angistorhinopsis; †Coburgosuchus; †Machaeroprosopus; †Mystriosuchus; †Nicrosaurus; †Redondasaurus

Synonyms
- Mystriosuchidae Huene, 1915; Pseudopalatinae Long and Murry, 1995

= Mystriosuchini =

Mystriosuchini Temporal range: Late Triassic 228–201.4 Ma

Extinct tribe of reptiles

Mystriosuchini, historically known as Pseudopalatinae, is an extinct tribe (formerly subfamily) of derived phytosaurs in the clade Leptosuchomorpha. As with all other phytosaurs, mystriosuchins lived during Late Triassic. The name is derived from the genus Mystriosuchus, and the clade was phylogenetically defined by Andrew S. Jones and Richard J. Butler in 2018 as the last common ancestor and all descendants of Mystriosuchus planirostris, Machaeroprosopus jablonskiae, and Machaeroprosopus buceros.

Genera classified in Mystriosuchini include Coburgosuchus, Machaeroprosopus, Mystriosuchus, Nicrosaurus and Redondasaurus. It includes the most ecologically divergent phytosaurs, the terrestrial Nicrosaurus and the fully aquatic Mystriosuchus.

== Phylogeny ==
Below is a cladogram from Stocker (2012):

- Phytosauria
  - Wannia scurriensis
  - - Paleorhinus bransoni
    - - "Paleorhinus" sawini
      - Mystriosuchinae
        - Brachysuchus megalodon
        - Angistorhinus
        - - Rutiodon carolinensis
          - "Machaeroprosopus" zunii
          - Protome batalaria
          - Leptosuchomorpha
            - "Phytosaurus" doughtyi
            - TMM 31173-120
            - - Leptosuchus crosbiensis
              - Leptosuchus studeri
            - - - Smilosuchus lithodendrorum
                - - Smilosuchus adamanensis
                  - Smilosuchus gregorii
              - - Pravusuchus hortus
                - Mystriosuchini
                  - Machaeroprosopus mccauleyi
                  - - Mystriosuchus westphali
                    - Machaeroprosopus pristinus
