= Angistorhinopsis =

Angistorhinopsis Temporal range: Late Norian - Rhaetian 212–201.4 Ma

Scientific classification
- Kingdom: Animalia
- Phylum: Chordata
- Class: Reptilia
- Order: †Phytosauria
- Family: †Parasuchidae
- Subfamily: †Mystriosuchinae
- Tribe: †Mystriosuchini
- Genus: †Angistorhinopsis (Huene, 1922)

Type species
- A. ruetimeyeri (Huene, 1922)

Extinct genus of reptiles

Angistorhinopsis is an extinct genus of altirostral (long-snouted) mystriosuchin phytosaur. It was named for its supposed resemblance to Angistorhinus by Friedrich von Huene in 1922. Fossils have been found in Switzerland and date back to the latest Norian and Rhaetian stages of the Late Triassic, making it the youngest known phytosaur to have existed in Europe and, along with Redondasaurus from the United States, one of the last surviving members of Phytosauria before the group became extinct during the Triassic–Jurassic extinction event 199.6 million years ago.
