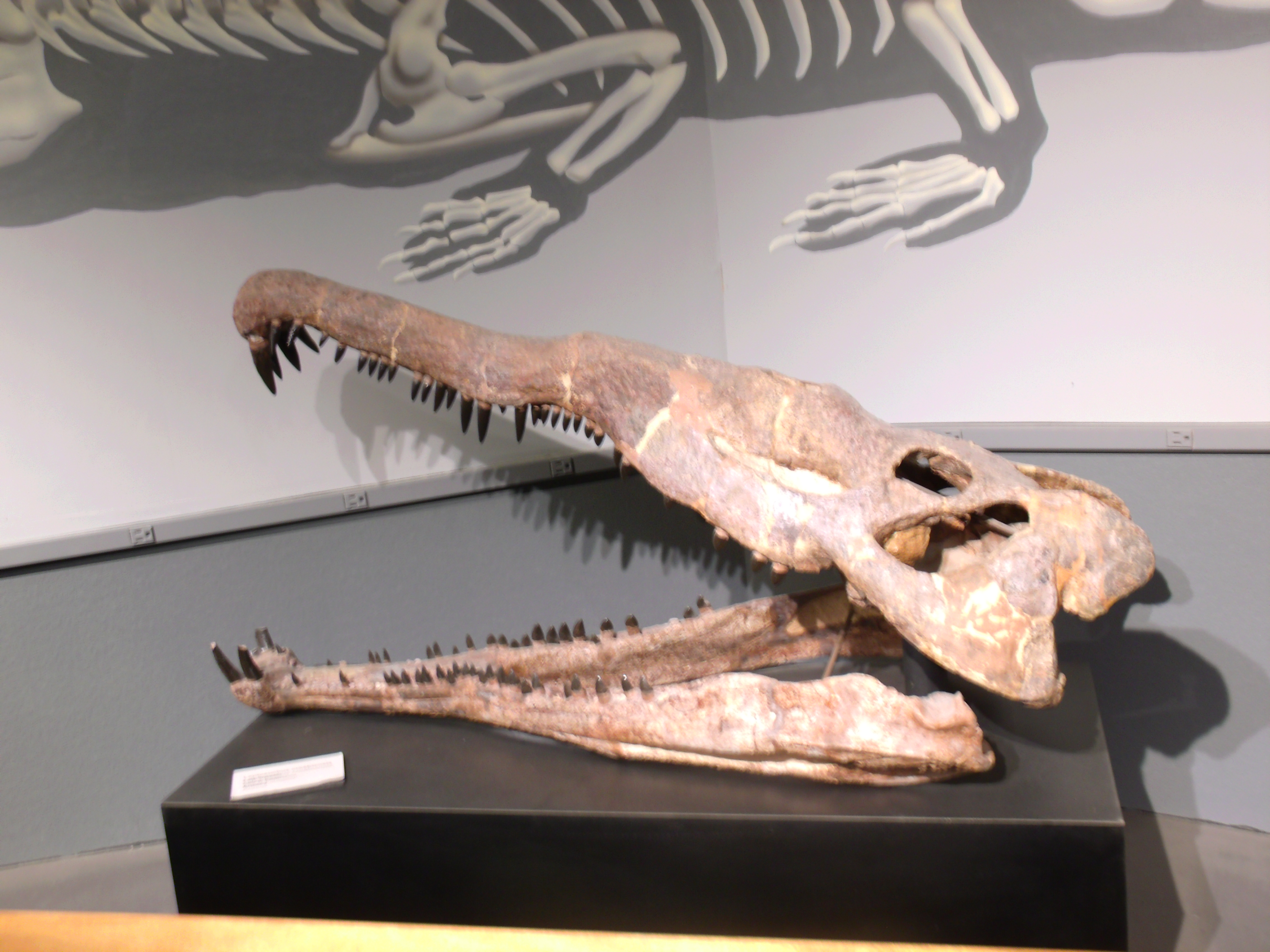
- L. crosbiensis skull at the Arizona Museum of Natural History

Scientific classification
- Kingdom: Animalia
- Phylum: Chordata
- Class: Reptilia
- Order: †Phytosauria
- Family: †Parasuchidae
- Subfamily: †Mystriosuchinae
- Clade: †Leptosuchomorpha
- Genus: †Leptosuchus; Case, 1922

Type species
- †Leptosuchus crosbiensis Case, 1922

Species
- †L. crosbiensis Case, 1922; †L. studeri Case & White, 1934

= Leptosuchus =

Leptosuchus Temporal range: Late Triassic, 237–208.5 Ma

Extinct genus of reptiles

Leptosuchus (from Ancient Greek λεπτός (leptós), meaning "thin", and Σοῦχος (Soûkhos), meaning "Sobek") is an extinct genus of leptosuchomorph parasuchid phytosaurs with a complex taxonomical history. Fossils have been found from the Dockum Group and lower Chinle Formation outcropping in Texas, New Mexico, and Arizona, United States, and date back to the Norian stage of the Late Triassic.

== History ==
The type species is L. crosbiensis, which was named in 1922 on the basis of material found from Texas. Another Texan species, L. studeri, was named in 1934 for a skull found in Potter County.

L. imperfecta is known from a partial skull, UMMP 7523, from same locality as the holotype of L. crosbiensis. It was collected as fragments and reassembled. Camp (1930) and Ballew (1989) referred it to L. crosbiensis. Long and Murry (1995) considered it to be a nomen nudum, as there was never full formal documentation of this specimen. They referred it to L. adamanensis (Smilosuchus). Stocker (2010) stated that the specimen is phylogenetically redundant and might be synonymous with L. crosbiensis, because its traits are identical to those of L. crosbiensis.

=== Other proposed species ===
L. adamanensis was first described in 1930 as a species of Machaeroprosopus from the Blue Mesa Member of Petrified Forest National Park, along with the other two species, L. lithodendrorum and L. gregorii. It was not until the publication of a 1995 paper on tetrapods of southwestern United States that L. adamanensis and L. lithodendrorum were moved into the genus Leptosuchus. However, because of the distinctive size of the rostral crest in L. gregorii, it was assigned to its own genus, Smilosuchus, in that same paper. Irmis (2005) considered L. gregorii to still belong within Leptosuchus, interpreting the large, complete crest as independently developed in this particular species. All species share in common a similar position of the temporal arch below the skull roof and a posterior process of the squamosal that extends farther than the paroccipital process. Stocker (2010) classified all three species as Smilosuchus, based on the results of the study's phylogenetic analysis.

The close relation of Leptosuchus and Machaeroprosopus with Rutiodon has led some paleontologists to believe that the prior two were synonymous with Rutiodon, with the latter's name having seniority. Differing features seen in the three phytosaurs have been attributed to sexual dimorphism, differing growth stages, or individual variation, while similarities could be seen in the rostral crest and the position of the nares. Previously it was believed that these were different genera due to the geographical isolation that could be seen in North American phytosaurs; Leptosuchus remains were found primarily in southern localities while Rutiodon remains could be found in more eastern localities. Other studies concluded that it was synonymous with Machaeroprosopus or Phytosaurus. A 1998 study again found Leptosuchus to be congeneric with Rutiodon, but since then another study has suggested that its type species R. carolinensis, while still very similar to Leptosuchus, is synonymous with Angistorhinus. Currently, Rutiodon, Angistorhinus, Leptosuchus, Smilosuchus, and Machaeroprosopus are considered separate genera.
