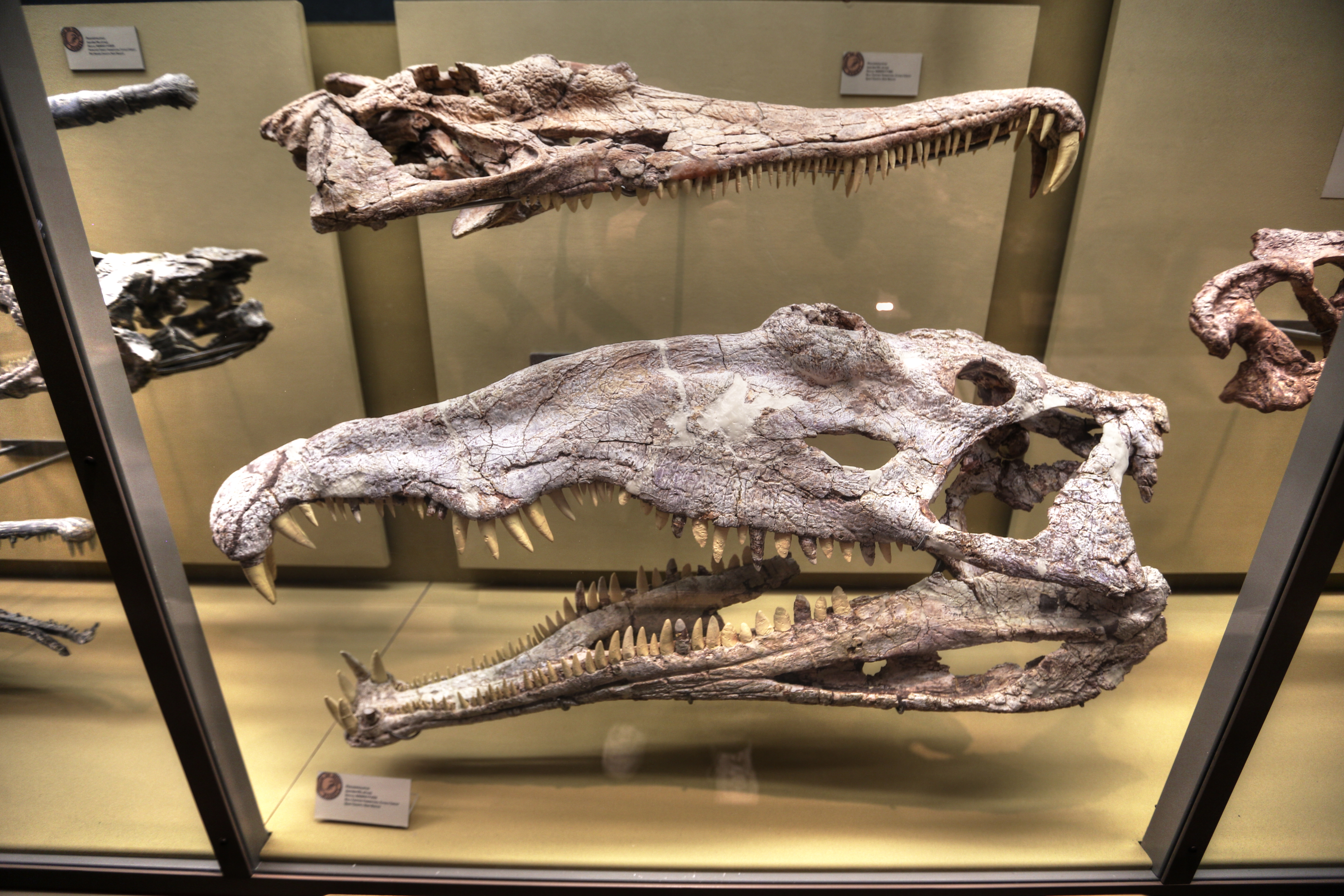
- Skulls in New Mexico

Scientific classification
- Kingdom: Animalia
- Phylum: Chordata
- Class: Reptilia
- Order: †Phytosauria
- Family: †Parasuchidae
- Subfamily: †Mystriosuchinae
- Tribe: †Mystriosuchini
- Genus: †Machaeroprosopus; Mehl et al., 1916

Type species
- †Machaeroprosopus buceros Cope, 1881

Species
- †M. andersoni Mehl, 1922; †M. buceros (Cope, 1881); †M. jablonskiae (Parker & Irmis, 2006); †M. lottorum Hungerbühler et al., 2013; †M. mccauleyi (Ballew, 1989); †M. pristinus (Mehl, 1928); †M. validus Mehl in Mehl et al., 1916

Synonyms
- Arribasuchus Long & Murry, 1995; Machaeroprosopus tenuis Camp, 1930; Pseudopalatus Mehl, 1928

= Machaeroprosopus =

Machaeroprosopus Temporal range: Late Triassic, 228–209 Ma

Extinct genus of reptiles

Machaeroprosopus (from Greek: μαχαίρα machaíra, 'large knife' and Greek: πρόσωπος prósōpos, 'bordering on') is an extinct genus of mystriosuchin leptosuchomorph phytosaur from the Late Triassic of the southwestern United States. M. validus, once thought to be the type species of Machaeroprosopus, was named in 1916 on the basis of three complete skulls from Chinle Formation, Arizona. The skulls have been lost since the 1950s, and a line drawing in the original 1916 description is the only visual record of the specimen. Another species, M. andersoni, was named in 1922 from New Mexico, and the species M. adamanensis, M. gregorii, M. lithodendrorum, M. tenuis, and M. zunii were named in 1930. Most species have been reassigned to the genera Smilosuchus, Rutiodon, or Phytosaurus. Until recently, M. validus was considered to be the only species that has not been reassigned. Thus, Machaeroprosopus was considered to be a nomen dubium or "doubtful name" because of the lack of diagnostic specimens that can support its distinction from other phytosaur genera. However, a taxonomic revision of Machaeroprosopus, conducted by Parker et al. in 2013, revealed that UW 3807, the holotype of M. validus, is not the holotype of Machaeroprosopus, while the species Machaeroprosopus buceros, Machaeroprosopus being a replacement name, with a fixed type species, for Metarhinus, is the combinatio nova of the type species of the genu: Belodon buceros. Therefore, the name Pseudopalatus must be considered a junior synonym of Machaeroprosopus, and all species of the former must be reassigned to the latter. This revised taxonomy was already accepted in several studies, including Stocker and Butler (2013). Stocker and Butler (2013) also treated M. andersoni as a valid species, and not a junior synonym of Machaeroprosopus buceros as was previously suggested by Long and Murry (1995).

== Species ==
=== M. andersoni ===
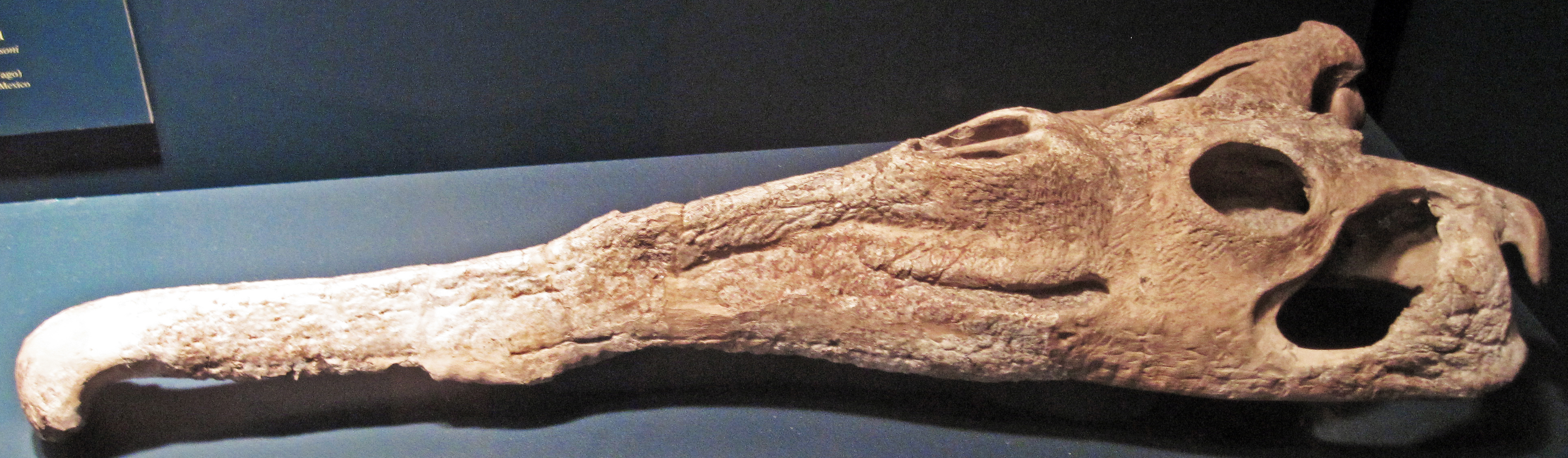
Skull of M. andersoni

M. andersoni was first described and named by Maurice G. Mehl in 1922, on the basis of the holotype FMNH UC 396, partial skull. It was probably collected from the Bull Canyon Formation of the Chinle Group or Dockum Group, probably at the Bull Canyon, in the Guadalupe County of New Mexico. This taxon was considered to be a junior synonym of M. buceros by Long and Murry (1995) and later authors, although Stocker and Butler (2013) treated M. andersoni as a valid species.

The holotype is the only known specimen of this species, although there are other specimens from the Bull Canyon Formation that were referred to Arribasuchus buceros by Long and Murry (1995), but not by Stocker and Butler (2013).

=== M. buceros ===
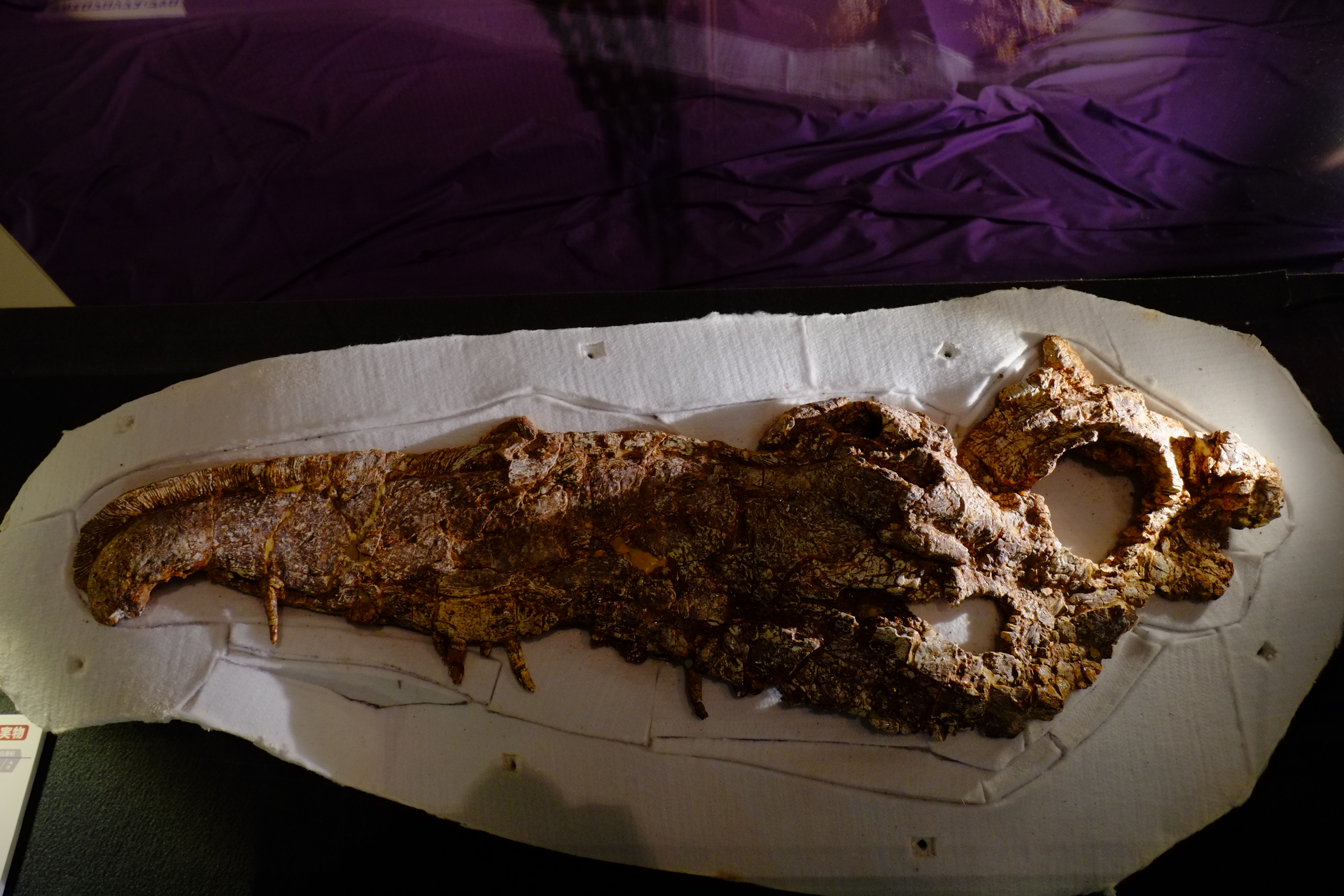
M. buceros skull

M. buceros was first described and named by Edward Drinker Cope in 1881 as Belodon buceros, on the basis of the holotype AMNH 2318, partial skull. It was collected from the Norian-aged Petrified Forest Member of the Chinle Formation, at the Arroyo Seco drainage, Orphan Mesa in the Rio Arriba County of New Mexico. Later, the skull was occasionally referred to Phytosaurus buceros. Jaekel (1910) erected a new genus for the species, creating Metarhinus buceros, however this generic name was preoccupied by Metarhinus Osborn, 1908, a brontotheriid mammal. Mehl (1915) referred this species to Lophoprosopus, as Lophoprosopus buceros, but as the type species of this genus is considered to be synonymous with Nicrosaurus kapffi, Mehl (1916) erected a new genus for B. buceros, creating Machaeroprosopus buceros, but also explicitly indicated M. validus as the type. Subsequent studies accordingly considered M. validus to be the type species of Machaeroprosopus. Later, the skull was referred to as Rutiodon buceros, Machaeroprosopus buceros or Pseudopalatus buceros. Long and Murry (1995) erected a new genus for the species, not knowing that M. validus was not in fact the type species of Machaeroprosopus, creating Arribasuchus buceros. Subsequent studies, including Hungerbühler (2002), Lucas et al. (2002), Zeigler et al. (2002), Irmis (2005) and Parker and Irmis (2006), referred the species back to Pseudopalatus buceros, and considered Arribasuchus to be a junior synonym of Pseudopalatus. A taxonomic revision of Machaeroprosopus, conducted by Parker et al. in 2013, revealed that Machaeroprosopus buceros is the combinatio nova of the type species of the genus because Article 67-8 ICZN rules that with replacement names the original type species (i.c. Cope's Beladon buceros) is maintained. Therefore, the name Pseudopalatus was considered a junior synonym of Machaeroprosopus, and all species of the former were reassigned to the later, including P. buceros. Following the revision, M. andersoni was treated as a valid species by Stocker and Butler (2013), and not a junior synonym of Machaeroprosopus buceros as was previously suggested by Long and Murry (1995). Other specimens were referred to P. buceros by Long and Murry (1995), although all specimens from Arizona and Texas was later reassigned to other species (namely M. lottorum, M. mccauleyi and M. validus), and as M. andersoni from the Dockum Group was re-validated, M. buceros is currently known only from Chinle Formation of New Mexico.

=== M. jablonskiae ===
M. jablonskiae was first described and named by William G. Parker and Randall B. Irmis in 2006, on the basis of the holotype PEFO 31207, posterior skull roof and braincase missing the rostrum and palate. This specimen was initially referred to Pseudopalatus cf. mccauleyi by Parker and Irmis (2004) based on the morphology of the squamosals and the opisthotic, then to Pseudopalatus sp. by Parker and Irmis (2005) and finally to Pseudopalatus jablonskiae by Parker and Irmis (2006). It was collected in September 2002 from the lower Jim Camp Wash beds, Sonsela Member of the Chinle Formation, at locality PFV 295, near Mountain Lion Mesa in Petrified Forest National Park, Arizona. The specific name honors Pat Jablonsky, who discovered the holotype and only known specimen. Following the taxonomic revision of Machaeroprosopus by Parker et al. (2013), all species of Pseudopalatus, including P. jablonskiae, were reassigned to Machaeroprosopus. This was already accepted by Stocker and Butler (2013).

Although M. jablonskiae is known from an incomplete specimen, it can be diagnosed by at least one autapomorphy and a unique suite of traits, and it includes a well-preserved braincase, which is rarely preserved or described in detail for most phytosaur specimens. A phylogenetic analysis of mystriosuchin phytosaurs performed by Parker and Irmis (2006) found the species to be the most basal species of "Pseudopalatus".

=== M. lottorum ===
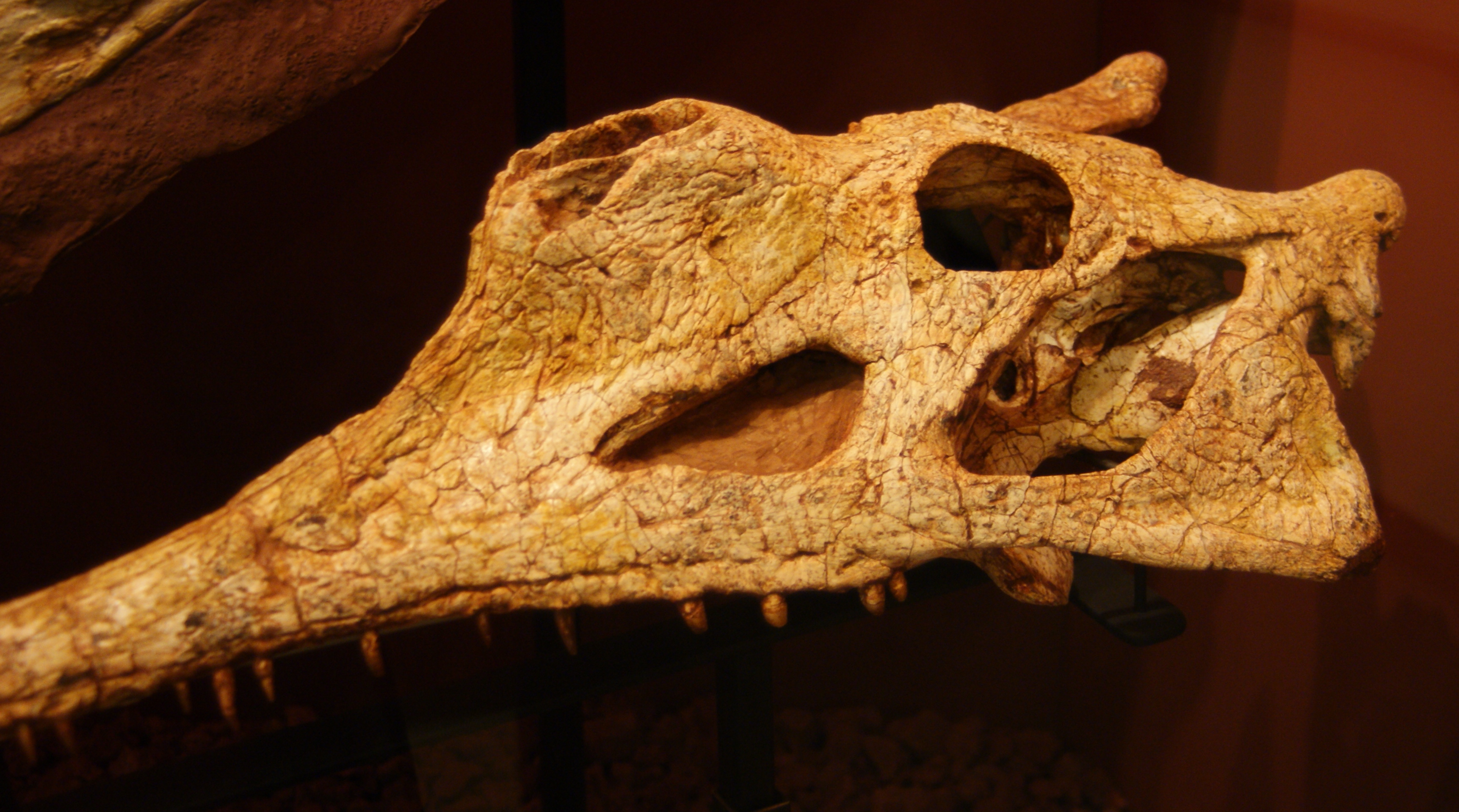
M. lottorum skull

M. lottorum was first described and named by Axel Hungerbühler, Bill Mueller, Sankar Chatterjee and Douglas P. Cunningham in 2013. The specific name honors John Lott and Patricia Lott Kirkpatrick, for their support during the work at the TTU VPL 3870. It is known from two complete skulls, the holotype TTU-P10076 and the paratype TTU-P10077 housed at Texas Tech University. The skulls were collected at Patricia Site (TTU Vertebrate Paleontology Locality 3870), 13 km South of Post, Garza County of west Texas, from the upper unit of the Norian Cooper Canyon Formation, Dockum Group. Other vertebrates known from this site include TTU-P10074, a partial skull referred to Machaeroprosopus sp., a phytosaur postcranial skeleton, fish, a temnospondyl amphibian, Typothorax, Postosuchus, Shuvosaurus and a theropod dinosaur.

A phylogenetic analysis of mystriosuchin phytosaurs performed by Hungerbühler et al. (2013) found the species to be a derived Machaeroprosopus species, most closely related to the type species of Redondasaurus, "R." gregorii. This clade in addition to Machaeroprosopus sp. (TTU-P10074) was recovered as the sister taxon of the clade formed by M. pristinus and M. buceros. M. jablonskiae, M. mccauleyi and "Redondasaurus" bermani were found to be basal species of Machaeroprosopus.

=== M. mccauleyi ===
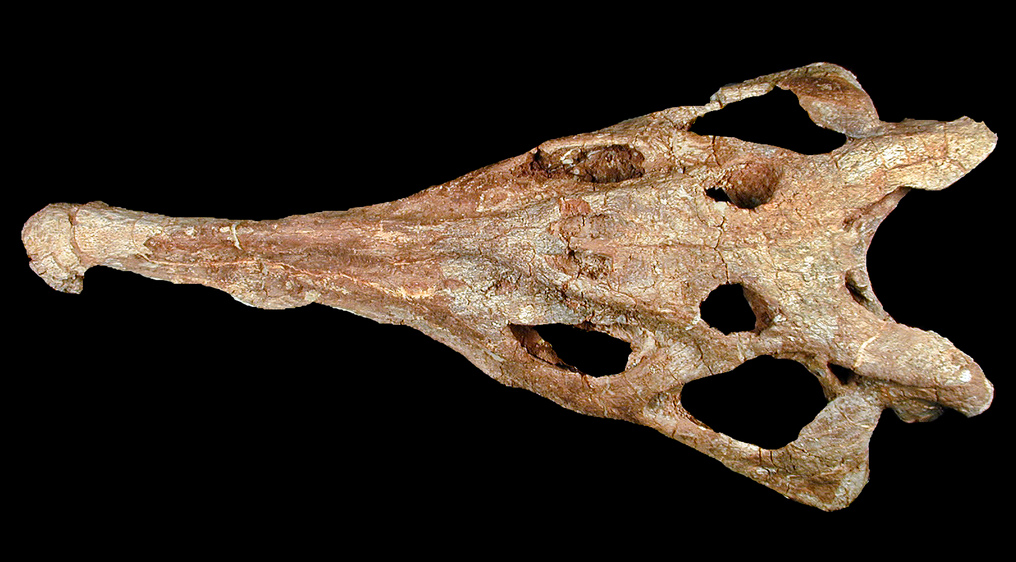
M. mccauleyi skull

M. mccauleyi was first described and named by Karen A. Ballew in 1989 as a species of Pseudopalatus, on the basis of the holotype UCMP 126999, an incomplete skull, lacking the anterior half of the rostrum, and probably associated lower jaws. The specific name honors John D. McCauley and Mrs. Molly McCauley McLean from Winslow, Arizona, the owners of the land at "Billings Gap" from which the holotype was found. The specimen was originally informally designated as Pseudopalatus "bilingsensis" by Ballew (1986). It was collected at Dry Creek Tank SE (also known as UCMP V82040, UCMP 7043 and PFV 55), Apache County of Arizona, from the Norian-aged Upper Petrified Forest Member / Formation according to most authors, or possibly Sonsela Member of the Chinle Formation according to Parker & Irmis (2005). Ballew (1989) also referred to this species USNM 15839, another incomplete skull lacking the anterior half of the rostrum from Arizona. Long and Murry (1995) restricted this species to its holotype, although recent studies suggest that USNM 15839 is referable to it. Long and Murry (1995) also considered M. mccauleyi to be a species of their Arribasuchus, probably synonymous with A. buceros, although most subsequent studies, like Hungerbühler (2002), Parker and Irmis (2006), Stocker (2010) and Stocker and Butler (2013) treated M. mccauleyi as a valid species. Other specimens that are currently referred to M. mccauleyi include PEFO 31219, complete skull, lower jaws and articulated postcranial skeleton, from Petroglyph phytosaur site (also known as PFV 42) collected by UCMP in 1985, and possibly UCMP 27149, a large skull, from Cowboy (UCMP A257), both from the Petrified Forest Member, Arizona. Both specimen were originally referred to A. buceros by Long and Murry (1995).

=== M. pristinus ===
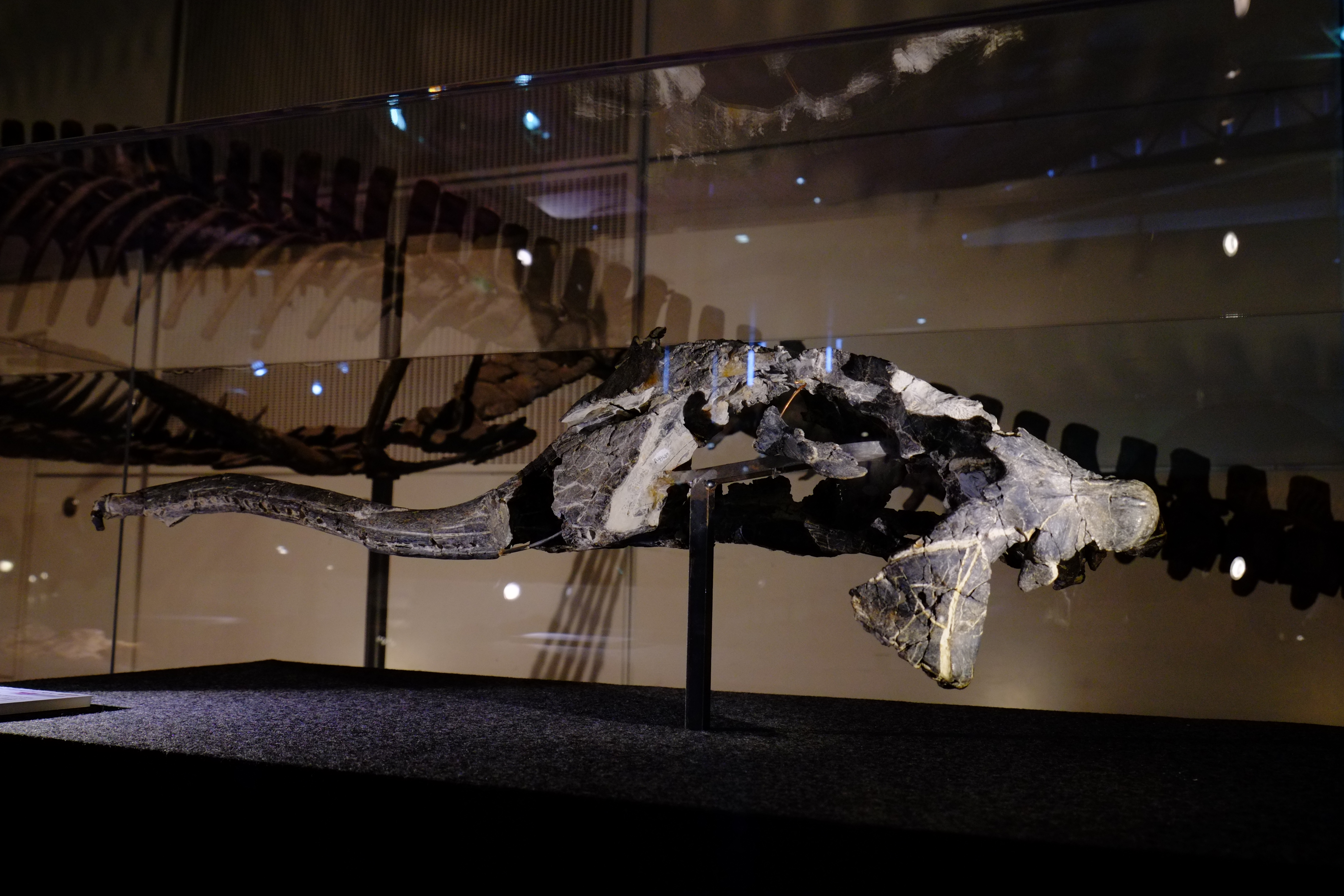
M. pristinus skull

M. pristinus was first described and named by Maurice G. Mehl in 1928 as the type species of Pseudopalatus, Pseudopalatus pristinus, on the basis of the holotype MU 525, nearly complete skull. It was collected, from the Norian-aged Upper Petrified Forest Member of the Chinle Formation, near Adamana, Arizona. Additional skulls and postcranial material, some articulated skeletons, from the same member were referred to this species by Colbert (1946) and Long and Murry (1995) from Arizona, and by Lawler (1979), Ballew (1986) and Long and Murry (1995) from New Mexico. Charles Camp (1930) described and named Machaeroprosopus tenuis on the basis of UCMP 27018, a nearly complete skull, lower jaws, and some complete postcranial material, from the Billings Gap locality (UCMP 7043, Upper Petrified Forest Member), Apache County of Arizona. This specimen was occasionally referred to as Rutiodon tenuis, although since Long and Murry (1995) it is considered to be a junior synonym of M. pristinus. Long and Murry (1995) also suggested that Redondasaurus gregorii from the Redonda Formation of New Mexico is a junior synonym of M. pristinus, although this was not accepted by subsequent authors. Other, then unnumbered, specimens from the upper Church Rock Member (Chinle Formation, Utah), Bull Canyon Formation and Travesser Formation (New Mexico) and Cooper Canyon Formation (Texas), were referred to M. pristinus by Long and Murry (1995), although recent studies suggest that M. pristinus is currently known only from the Upper Petrified Forest Member of Arizona and New Mexico.

=== M. validus ===
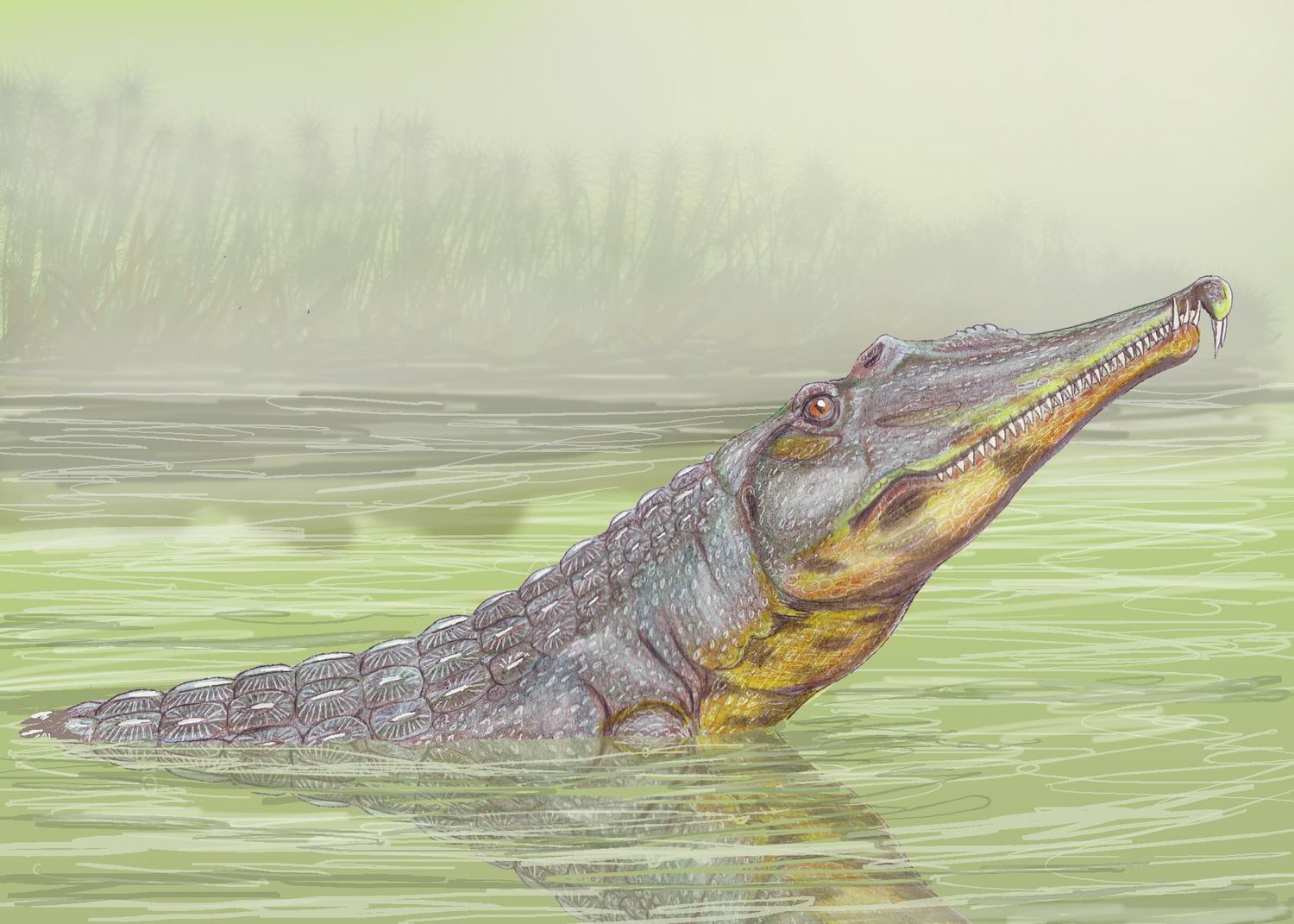
M. validus restoration

M. validus was first described and named by Maurice G. Mehl in Mehl et al., in 1916 on the basis of the holotype UW 3807, a complete skull, and the two paratypes UW 3808 and UW 3809, partial skulls, from Norian-aged Upper Petrified Forest Member of the Chinle Formation, Coconino County of Arizona. The skulls have been lost since the 1950s, and a line drawing in the original 1916 description is the only visual record of the specimen. M. validus, once thought to be the type species of Machaeroprosopus, was suggested by some authors to represent the same species as Pseudopalatus pristinus. If this is the case, the name Machaeroprosopus would have precedence over Pseudopalatus because Pseudopalatus was named in 1928, twelve years after Machaeroprosopus was named. Long and Murry (1995) erected a new genus for Belodon buceros, not knowing that it was in fact the type species of Machaeroprosopus (and not M. validus), creating Arribasuchus buceros. They also suggested that M. validus might be a junior synonym of A. buceros.

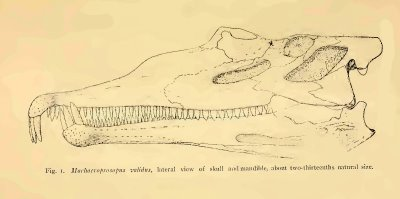
Line drawing of the skull of M. validus in Mehl et al. (1916)

Until recently, M. validus was considered to be the only species of Machaeroprosopus that has not been reassigned. Thus, Machaeroprosopus was considered to be a nomen dubium or "doubtful name" because of the lack of diagnostic specimens that can support its distinction from other phytosaur genera. However, a taxonomic revision of Machaeroprosopus, conducted by Parker et al. (in press), revealed that UW 3807 is not the holotype of Machaeroprosopus, while the species Machaeroprosopus buceros is in fact the correct new combination for the type species of the genus.
