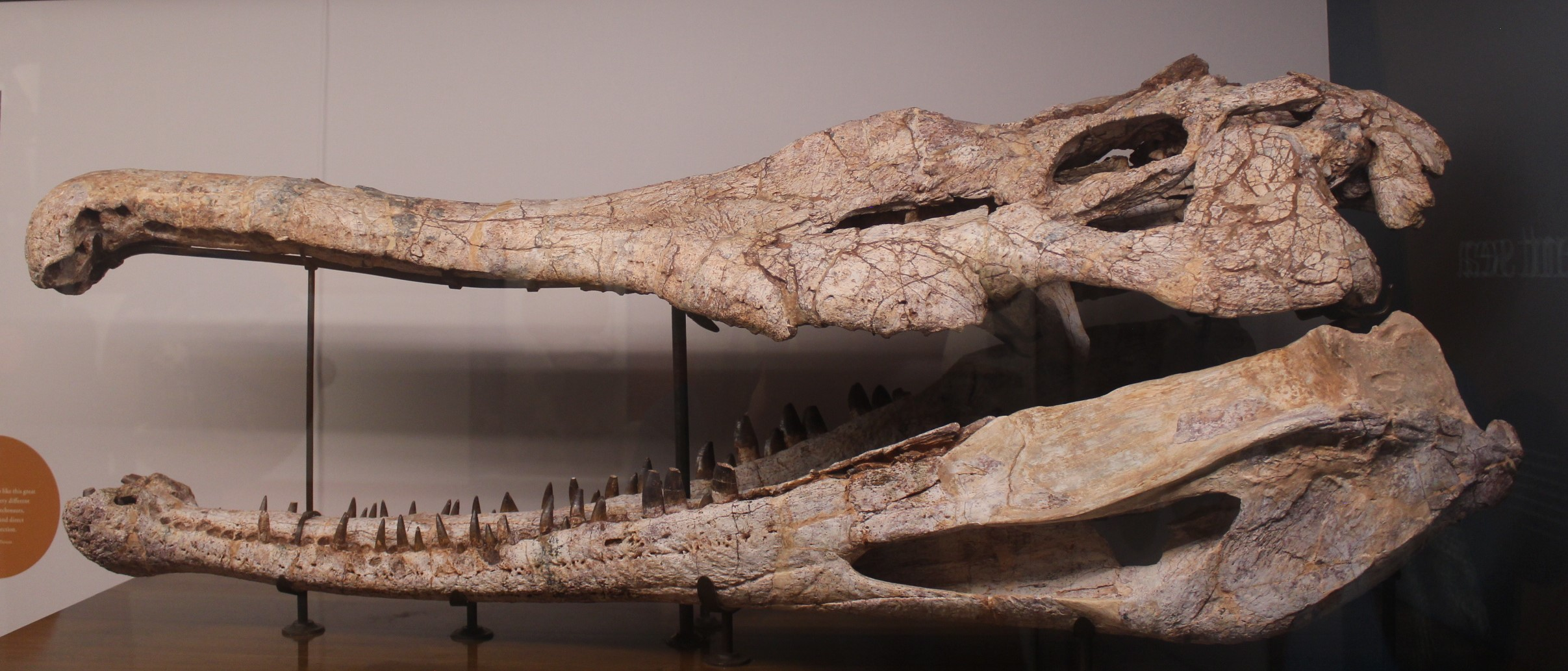
- Skull of Brachysuchus megalodon in the University of Michigan Museum of Natural History

Scientific classification
- Kingdom: Animalia
- Phylum: Chordata
- Class: Reptilia
- Order: †Phytosauria
- Family: †Parasuchidae
- Subfamily: †Mystriosuchinae
- Genus: †Brachysuchus; Case, 1929

Type species
- †Brachysuchus megalodon Case, 1929

= Brachysuchus =

Brachysuchus Temporal range: Late Triassic, 228–209 Ma

Extinct genus of reptiles

Brachysuchus (from Ancient Greek βραχύς (brakhús), meaning "short", and Σοῦχος (Soûkhos), meaning "Sobek") is an extinct genus of parasuchid phytosaurs known from the late Triassic period (Carnian stage) of Dockum Group in Texas, United States. It is known from the holotype UMMP 10336 is composed of a skull, lower jaws and partial postcranium and from the associated paratype UMMP 14366, nearly complete skull, recovered from the 'Pre-Tecovas Horizon' in the Dockum Group. It was first named by Case in 1929 and the type species is Brachysuchus megalodon. Its closest relative was Angistorhinus. However, its rostral crest was much smaller than that of Angistorhinus, and the rostrum as a whole is shorter and thicker.

== Features ==
The lower jaws of Brachysuchus are expanded at the tip to form a large bulge, holding the creature's largest tusks. The surface of this part of the bone has a wrinkled look, with many blood vessels running through it. In the lower jaw, there are three tusks in each side of this protuberance. Behind this part the jaws have fused together for a little under half their length before diverging after thirty-one of forty-six post-protuberance teeth. While some of the tusks at the tip are missing, most of the rest of the teeth in the jaw are still present. There are new tusks forming in the sockets, indicating that Brachysuchus regrew teeth all its life. There is a large foramen between the dentary, the angular and the prearticular that passes right through the jaw (visible on the picture).

The teeth themselves are asymmetrical in cross-section, with the outer side more convex than the inner side. This asymmetry increases from front to back. They are long and conical, and those from the ninth to twenty-ninth have flutings on the sides. From the thirtieth to the forty-ninth, they have no flutings but are crenulated and broaden antero-posteriorly. This suggests that these teeth were better for slicing prey than the previous tusks and conical teeth, which would have impaled and injured it. In parts of the jaws the fused section in the middle rises so high that the teeth could only grip prey and could probably have done little damage.

The prearticular is fused with the articular.

The skull is around 125 cm long, with a distinctive hooked tip. It is much shorter and broader than that of many phytosaurs such as Leptosuchus or Angistorhinus. The eye sockets are narrow and long, and the fenestrae are smaller and less rounded than Angistorhinus. It has a comparatively small rostral crest. There are several rough surfaces at the posterior end denoting probable muscle attachments, which show that it had very powerful jaw muscles and a strong bite.

Overall Brachysuchus was approximately eight metres long, much bigger than most contemporary phytosaurs. It had extremely heavy jaws and a relatively short fused region, giving it a wider bite. There is also evidence of heavily developed jaw muscles. This, as well as the cutting teeth mentioned earlier, indicates that Brachysuchus preyed on different animals to its thinner-jawed relatives. Instead of using its jaws to catch fish, it was able to attack and feed off the heavily armoured stegocephalians that roamed the surrounding area, and would probably have eaten other phytosaurs if food was scarce. The slightly deformed tip of one specimen's lower jaw suggests that it used a lot of force to break through its prey's armour.
