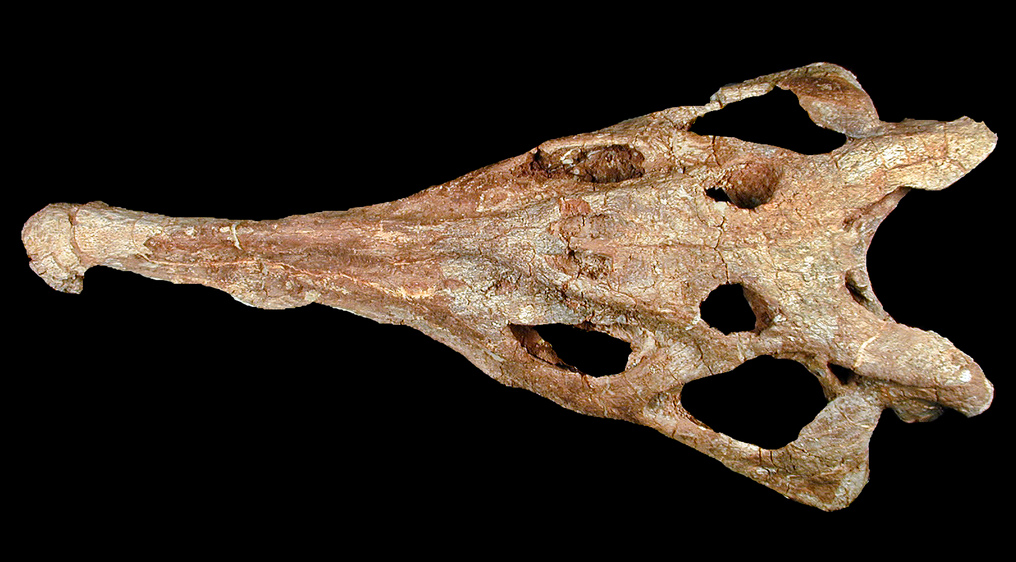
- Skull of Machaeroprosopus mccauleyi

Scientific classification
- Kingdom: Animalia
- Phylum: Chordata
- Class: Reptilia
- Order: †Phytosauria
- Family: †Parasuchidae; Lydekker, 1885

Subgroups
- †Arganarhinus; †Compsosaurus; †Ebrachosuchus; †Paleorhinus; †Parasuchus; †Phytosaurus; †Wannia; Mystriosuchinae von Huene, 1915; †Angistorhinus; †Brachysuchus; †Colossosuchus; †Jupijkam; †Protome; †Rutiodon; †Volcanosuchus; †Leptosuchomorpha

= Parasuchidae =

Parasuchidae Temporal range: Carnian - Rhaetian,

Extinct clade of reptiles

Parasuchidae is a clade of phytosaurs more derived than Diandongosuchus, a basal phytosaur. This family was phylogenetically defined by Christian Kammerer and colleagues in 2015 as the last common ancestor and all descendants of Wannia scurriensis, Parasuchus hislopi, and Mystriosuchus planirostris. It encompasses nearly all phytosaurs, including early Parasuchus-grade forms as well as a more restricted clade of more specialized phytosaurs. This more restricted clade is traditionally known as the family Phytosauridae and more recently as the subfamily Mystriosuchinae, defined by Kammerer et al. 2015 as the last common ancestor and all descendants of Mystriosuchus planirostris and Angistorhinus grandis.

Parasuchids have been recovered from Late Triassic deposits in Europe, North America, India, Morocco, Thailand, Brazil, Greenland and Madagascar. In their osteology of Parasuchus, Kammerer et al. (2016) suggested using Parasuchidae to include taxa traditionally included in Phytosauridae as well as Parasuchus-grade taxa. Stocker et al. (2017) use the phytosaur classification advocated by Kammerer et al. (2016) by recovering Diandongosuchus as the basalmost phytosaur outside Parasuchidae, noting that Diandongosuchus has a shorter snout than parasuchids.
