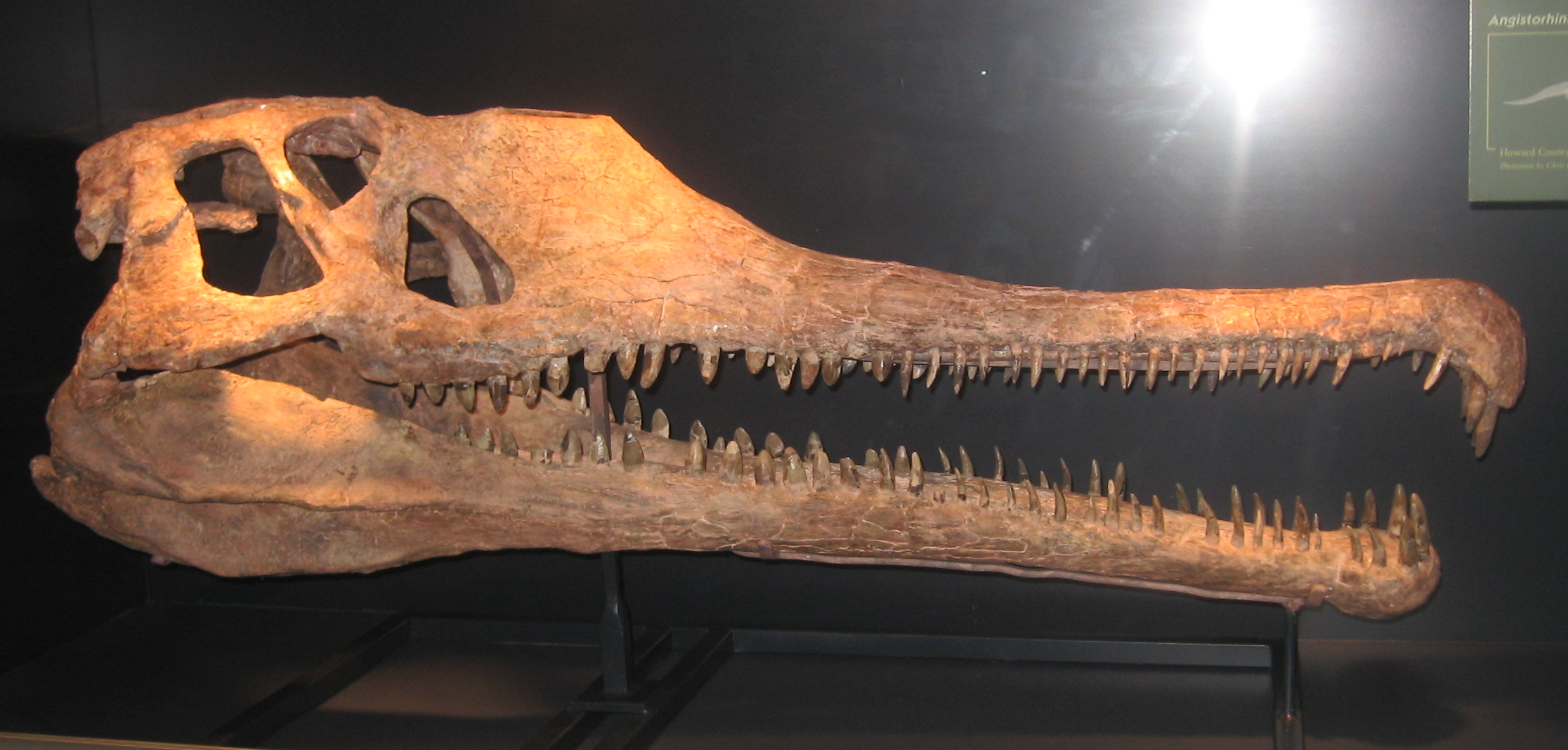
- Angistorhinus skull

Scientific classification
- Kingdom: Animalia
- Phylum: Chordata
- Class: Reptilia
- Order: †Phytosauria
- Family: †Parasuchidae
- Subfamily: †Mystriosuchinae
- Genus: †Angistorhinus; Mehl, 1913

Species
- †A. grandis Mehl, 1913 (type); †? A. talainti Dutuit, 1977

= Angistorhinus =

Angistorhinus Temporal range: 237–208.5 Ma

Extinct genus of reptiles

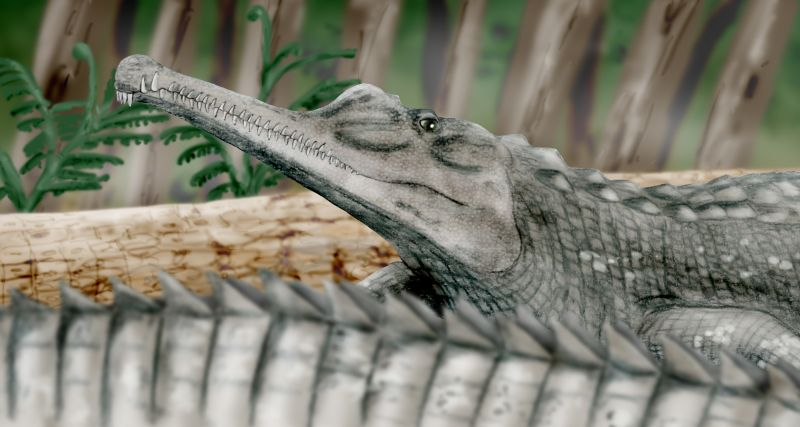
Life restoration of Angistorhinus grandis

Angistorhinus (meaning "narrow snout" or "hook snout") is an extinct genus of phytosaur known from the Late Triassic period of Texas and Wyoming, United States. It was first named by Mehl in 1913 and the type species is Angistorhinus grandis. Other species from Texas and Wyoming, A. alticephalus (Stovall and Wharton, 1936), A. gracilis (Mehl, 1915) and A. maximus (Mehl, 1928), are cospecific with the type species. Angistorhinus is known from the holotype UC 631, partial skull and lower jaws recovered from the Popo Agie Formation, Chugwater Group, Wyoming and from the associated paratype UM 531, a partial skull, TMM 31098-1, skull and lower jaws and ROM 7977, partial skull and lower jaws, recovered from the 'Pre-Tecovas Horizon' in the Dockum Group, Texas. A possible second species, A. talainti is known from the Triassic of Morocco. In 1995, Long and Murry created the new combination, Angistorhinus megalodon by synonymy for Brachysuchus. Hungerbühler and Sues (2001) hypothesised that Angistorhinus is a junior synonym of Rutiodon. However, in 2010 Michelle R. Stocker retained the validity of Brachysuchus and of A. grandis.

== Description ==
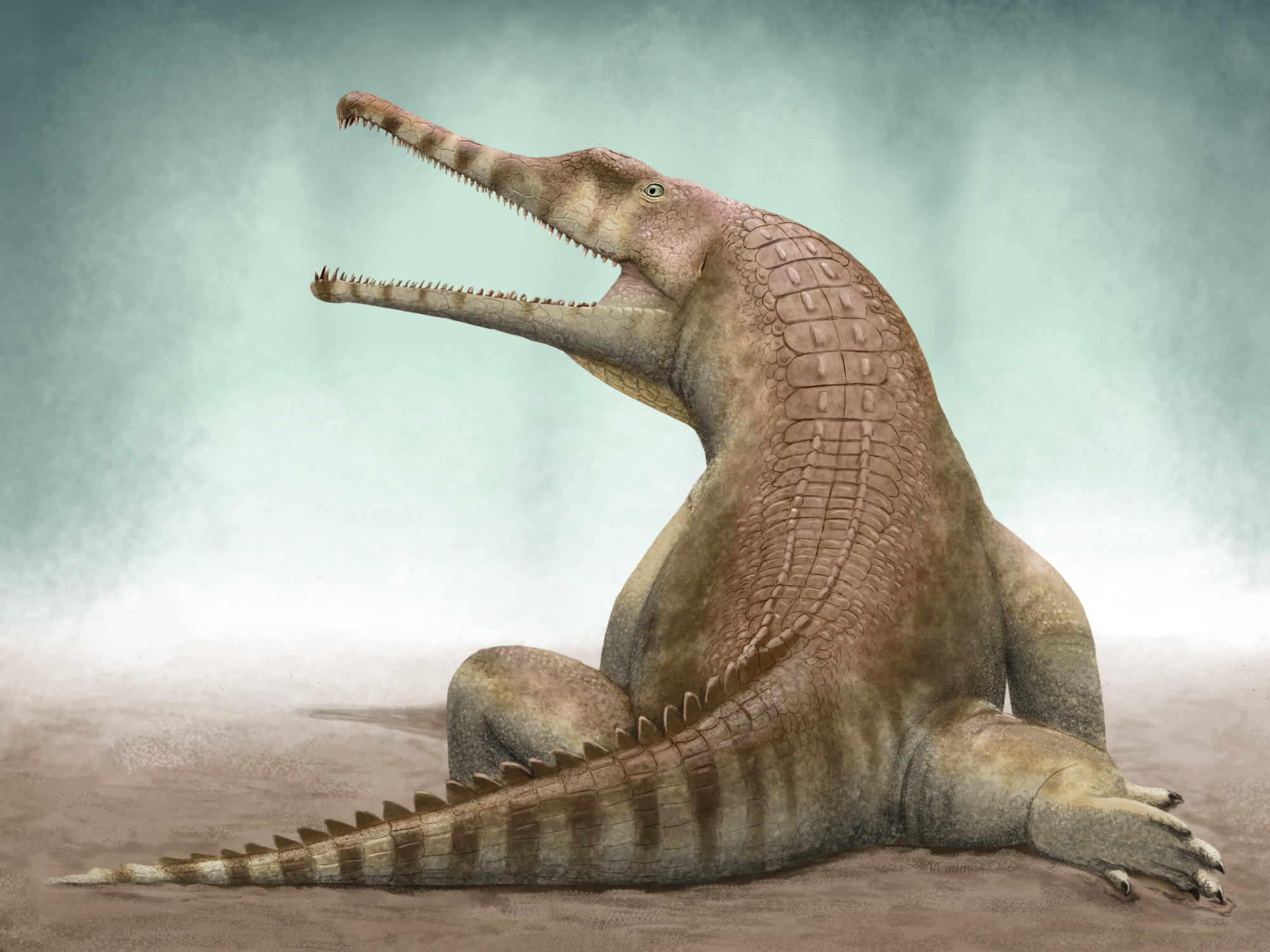
Angistorhinus grandis

Angistorhinus was another of the early phytosaur genera. It was similar to Parasuchus but differed in having the nostrils located further back, towards and above the eyes. This was a more specialized condition that characterized all late phytosaurs. Angisthorhinus was a huge animal by any standards; the skull length was about 120–124 cm; estimated overall length 7 to 8 meters long, more in A. megalodon, a very large, short and heavy-muzzled form sometimes given its own genus (Brachysuchus), and which far exceeded in size any living crocodile. The thickness of the enamel of Angistorhinus was the lowest among phytosaurs relative to overall crown size, although in absolute terms if had the thickest enamel among phytosaurs.
