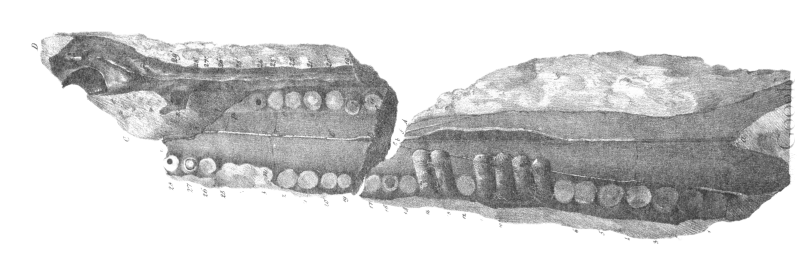
- Holotype jaw of P. cylindricodon
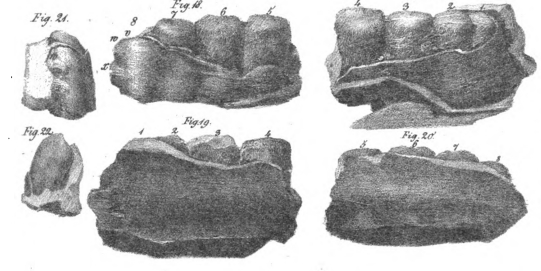
- Holotype of P. cubicodon

Scientific classification
- Domain: Eukaryota
- Kingdom: Animalia
- Phylum: Chordata
- Class: Reptilia
- Clade: Archosauromorpha
- Clade: Archosauriformes
- Order: †Phytosauria
- Family: †Parasuchidae
- Genus: †Phytosaurus von Jaeger, 1828

Type species
- †Phytosaurus cylindricodon von Jaeger, 1828

Other species
- †P. cubicodon von Jaeger, 1828

= Phytosaurus =

Phytosaurus Temporal range: Late Triassic, 220 Ma

Extinct genus of reptiles

Phytosaurus (meaning "plant lizard") is a dubious genus of extinct parasuchid phytosaur found in an outcrop of the Keuper (likely the Exter Formation) in Germany. Phytosaurus was the first phytosaur to be described, being done so by Georg Friedrich von Jaeger in 1828. The type species is P. cylindricodon and a second species, P. cubicodon, is also known.

== Discovery and naming ==
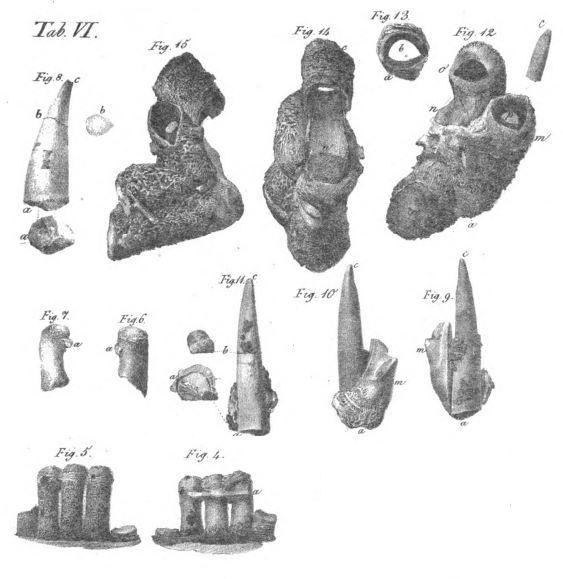
Associated elements from the holotype of P. cylindricodon

In 1826, the holotypes of both species were discovered in Wurttemburg, Germany at the "Neckar" site at the base of the hill which Wildenau Castle stands upon. The holotype of P. cylindricodon consists of parts of the skull and jaws, with natural casts of the teeth which, however, did not preserve their conical form but were flattened which led to the misunderstanding they were specialised in eating plant material, and the holotype of P. cubicodon consists of fragments of the jaw. Both species were named and described by von Jaeger (1828) and were first commented on by von Meyer (1837).

Many later authors, beginning with Owen (1841), have classified both species of Phytosaurus as nomen dubia due to the lack of known diagnostic material. Owen (1841) had Phytosaurus classified as a synonym of Mastodonsaurus, an unrelated amphibian, and later Labyrinthodon, a now obsolete taxon.

A partial phytosaur specimen found at the "UCMP V6333" locality of the Dockum Formation in Texas was initially referred to Phytosaurus sp., but has since been reclassified as an indeterminate mystriosuchine phytosaur.

== Description ==
P. cylindricodon appeared to have cylindrical teeth, while P. cubicodon appeared to have teeth that were square in shape. The conical teeth of the P. cylindricodon holotype appear to show evidence of grinding.

Phytosaurus likely grew up to 3 metres (9.8 ft) long and the skull of P. cylindricodon likely reached up to 1 metre (3.3 ft) when complete.

== Classification ==
Phytosaurus likely belonged to the Parasuchidae, a family of phytosaurs.
