= List of the prehistoric life of Arizona =

This list of the prehistoric life of Arizona contains the various prehistoric life-forms whose fossilized remains have been reported from within the US state of Arizona.

== Precambrian ==
The Paleobiology Database records no known occurrences of Precambrian fossils in Arizona.

== Paleozoic ==
=== Selected Paleozoic taxa of Arizona ===
- †Achistrum
- †Aglaocrinus
- †Altudoceras
- †Alula
- †Amphiscapha
- †Annularia
  - †Annularia asteris
  - †Annularia mucronata
  - †Annularia stellata
- †Anomphalus
- †Aphyllopteris
- †Arastra – type locality for genus
- †Archaeocidaris
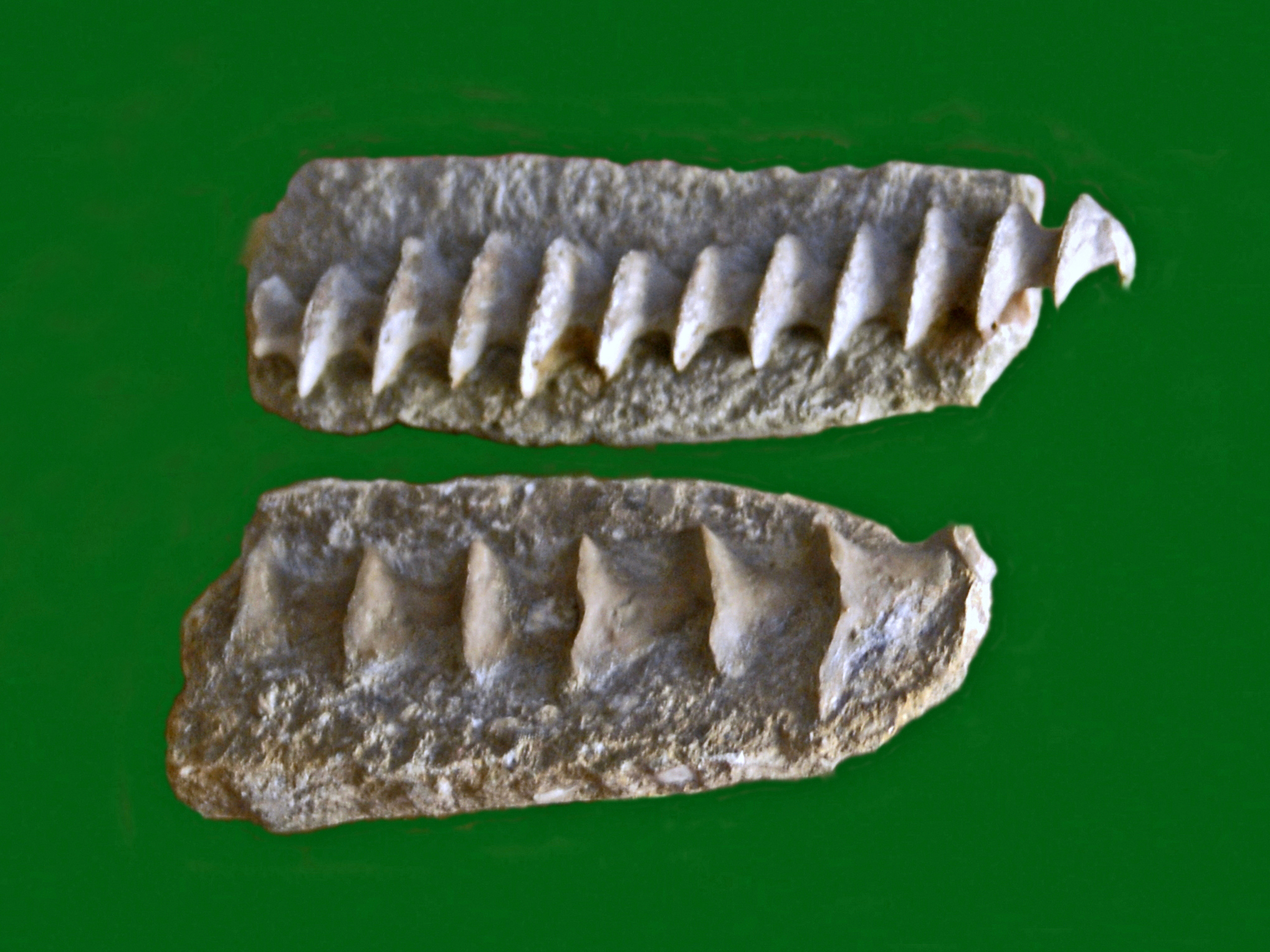
- Fossils of the Carboniferous-Permian bryozoan Archimedes
  †Archimedes
  - †Archimedes intermedius
  - †Archimedes invaginatus
  - †Archimedes lativolvis
  - †Archimedes proutanus
  - †Archimedes terebriformis
- †Arizonerpeton – type locality for genus
- †Athyris
- †Aulopora
- †Aviculopecten
  - †Aviculopecten bellatulus – type locality for species
  - †Aviculopecten girtyi – or unidentified comparable form
  - †Aviculopecten kaibabensis – type locality for species
- †Bellerophon
- †Brachyphyllum
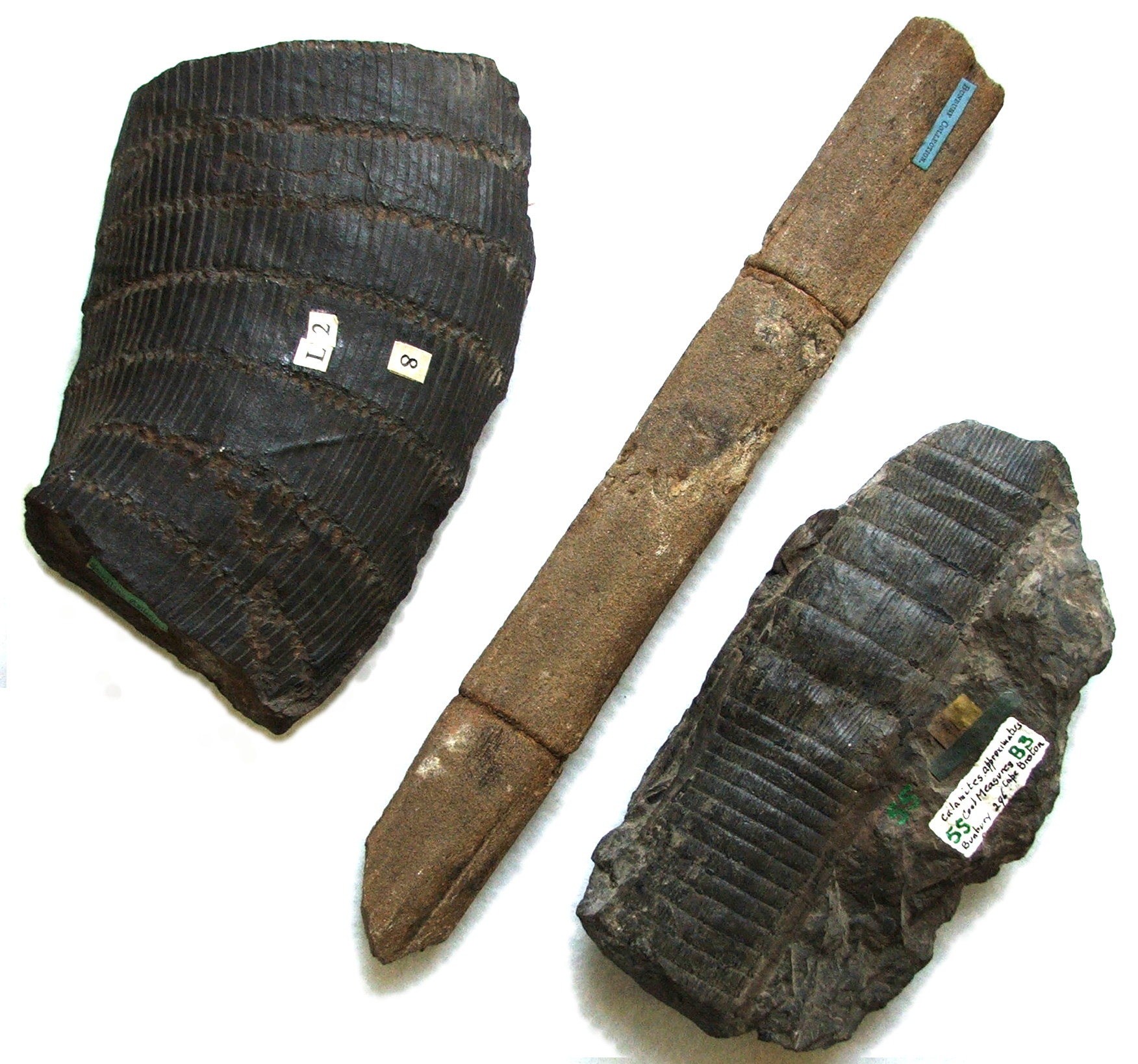
- Fossilized stems from the Carboniferous-Permian horsetail relative Calamites
  †Calamites
  - †Calamites cisti
- †Callipteris
  - †Callipteris conferta
- †Camarotoechia
  - †Camarotoechia metallica
  - †Camarotoechia mutata
- †Caninia – tentative report
- †Chonetes
  - †Chonetes oklahomensis
- †Cleiothyridina
  - †Cleiothyridina orbicularis
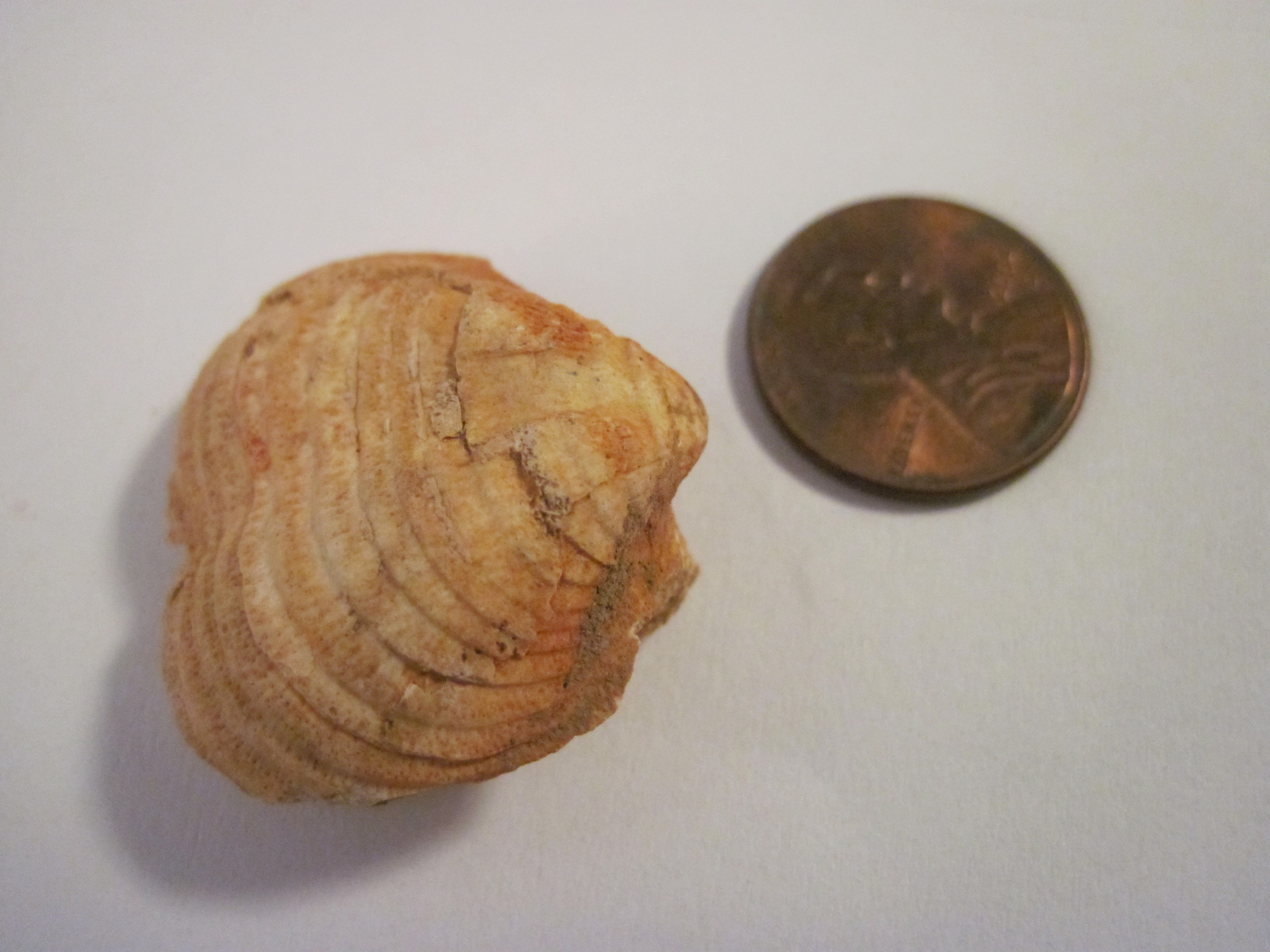
- Fossilized shell of the Late Devonian-Permian brachiopod Composita
  †Composita
  - †Composita humilis
  - †Composita laevis
  - †Composita mexicana
  - †Composita ovata
  - †Composita ozarkana
  - †Composita subtilita
  - †Composita trinuclea
- †Cooksonia – or unidentified comparable form
- †Cordaites
  - †Cordaites principalis
- †Cycloceras
- †Cyclopteris
- †Cymatochiton – tentative report
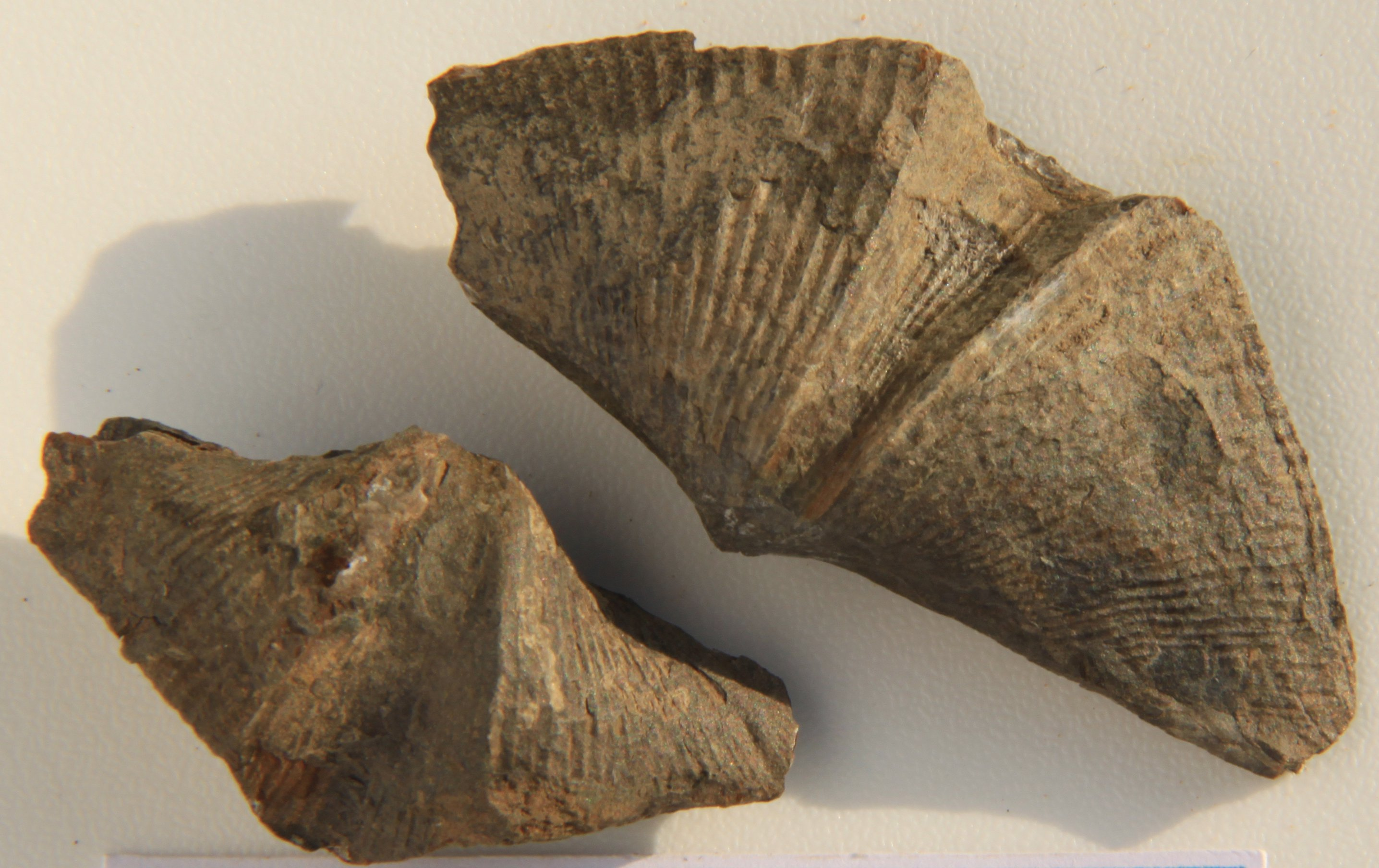
- Fossilized shells of the Middle-Late Devonian brachiopod Cyrtospirifer
  †Cyrtospirifer
  - †Cyrtospirifer whitneyi
- †Cystodictya
- †Echinaria
- †Edmondia
- †Elfridia – type locality for genus
- †Elrathia
- Eocaudina
- †Euomphalus
  - †Euomphalus utahensis
- †Fenestella
- †Fusulina
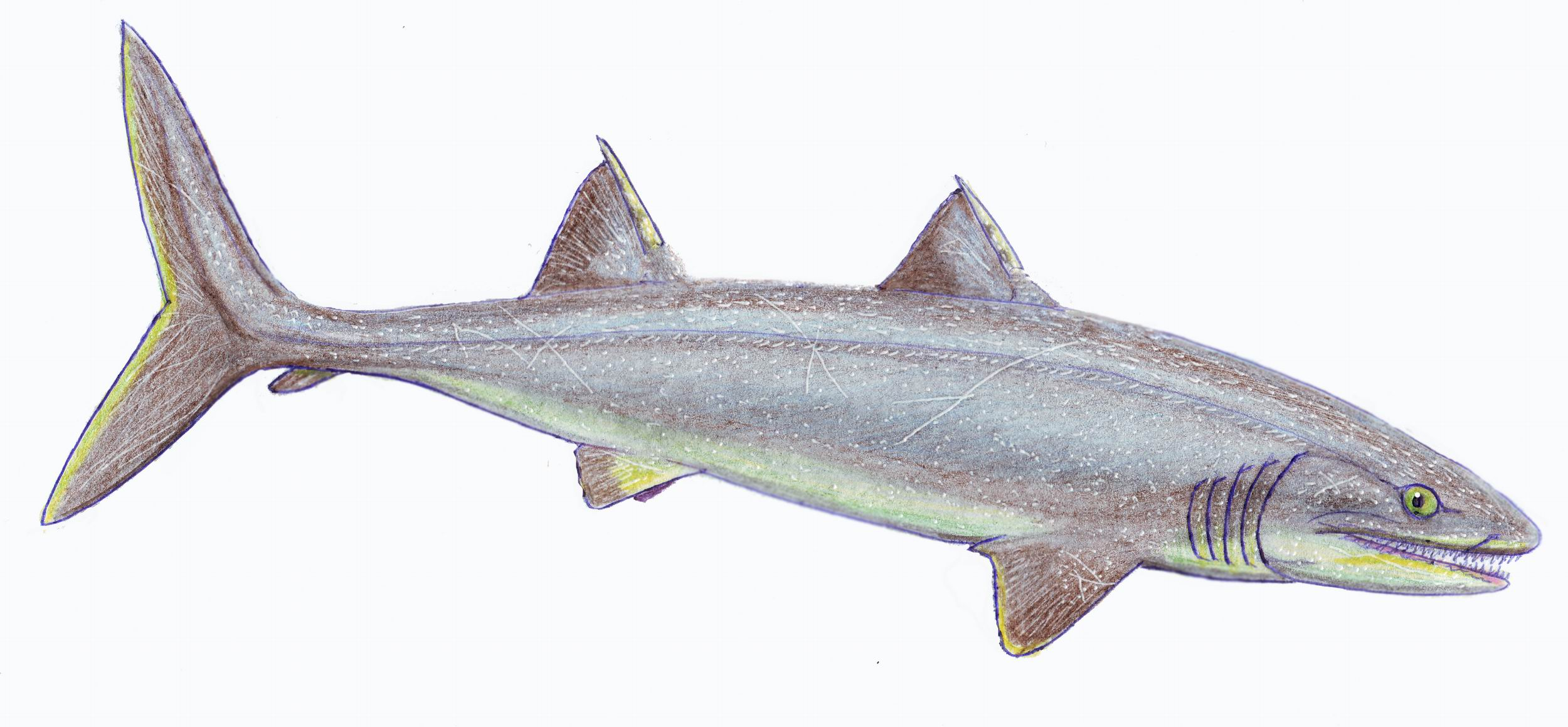
- Life restoration of the Carboniferous shark Glikmanius
  †Glikmanius
  - †Glikmanius occidentalis
- †Globular
- †Gnathorhiza – or unidentified comparable form
- †Hastimima – tentative report
- †Hedeia
- †Hexagonaria
- †Hyolithes
- †Icriodus
- †Idiognathodus
- †Kaibabvenator – type locality for genus
  - †Kaibabvenator swiftae – type locality for species
- †Kootenia
- †Lepidodendron
  - †Lepidodendron aculeatum
- †Lepidostrobus
- †Lingula
- †Lingulella
- †Liroceras
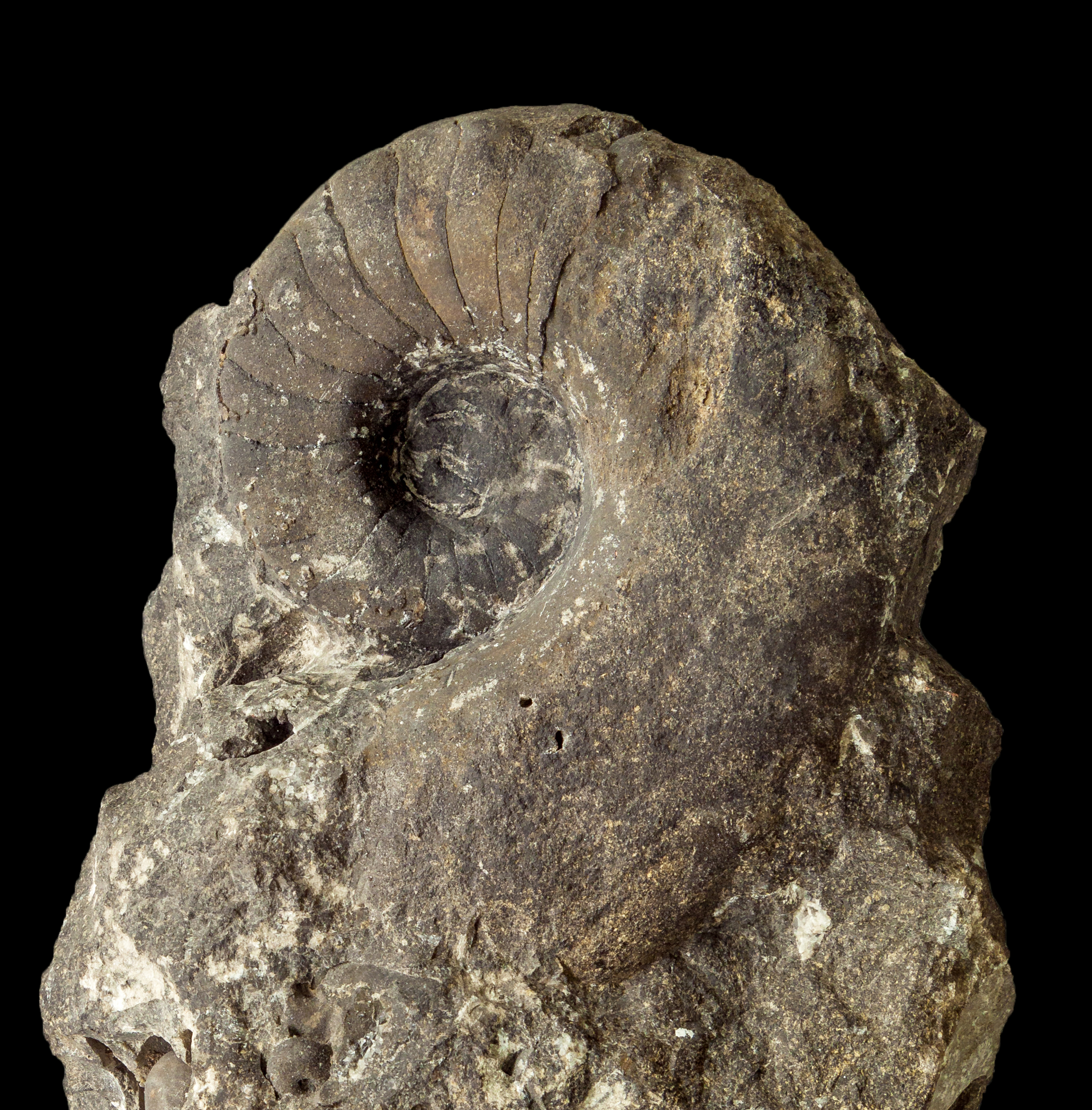
- Fossilized shell of the Carboniferous-Permian nautiloid cephalopod Metacoceras
  †Metacoceras
- †Michelina
- †Modiolus
- †Murchisonia
- †Naticopsis
  - †Naticopsis kaibabensis – type locality for species
  - †Naticopsis waterlooensis
- †Neospirifer – tentative report
  - †Neospirifer dunbari
- †Neuropteris
  - †Neuropteris heterophylla
  - †Neuropteris scheuchzeri
- †Nisusia
- Nucula
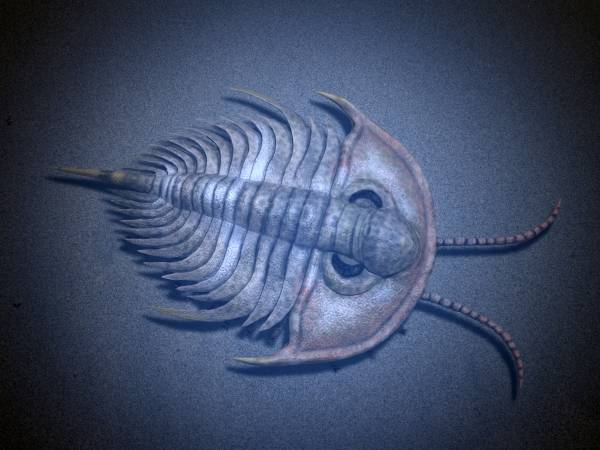
- Restoration of the Cambrian trilobite Olenellus
  †Olenellus
- †Ophiderpeton
- †Orodus
- †Orthacanthus
- †Pachyphyllum
- †Pagiophyllum
- †Paladin
- †Palmatolepis
  - †Palmatolepis triangularis
- †Paterina
- †Pecopteris
- †Pentremites
- †Petalodus
- †Phillipsia
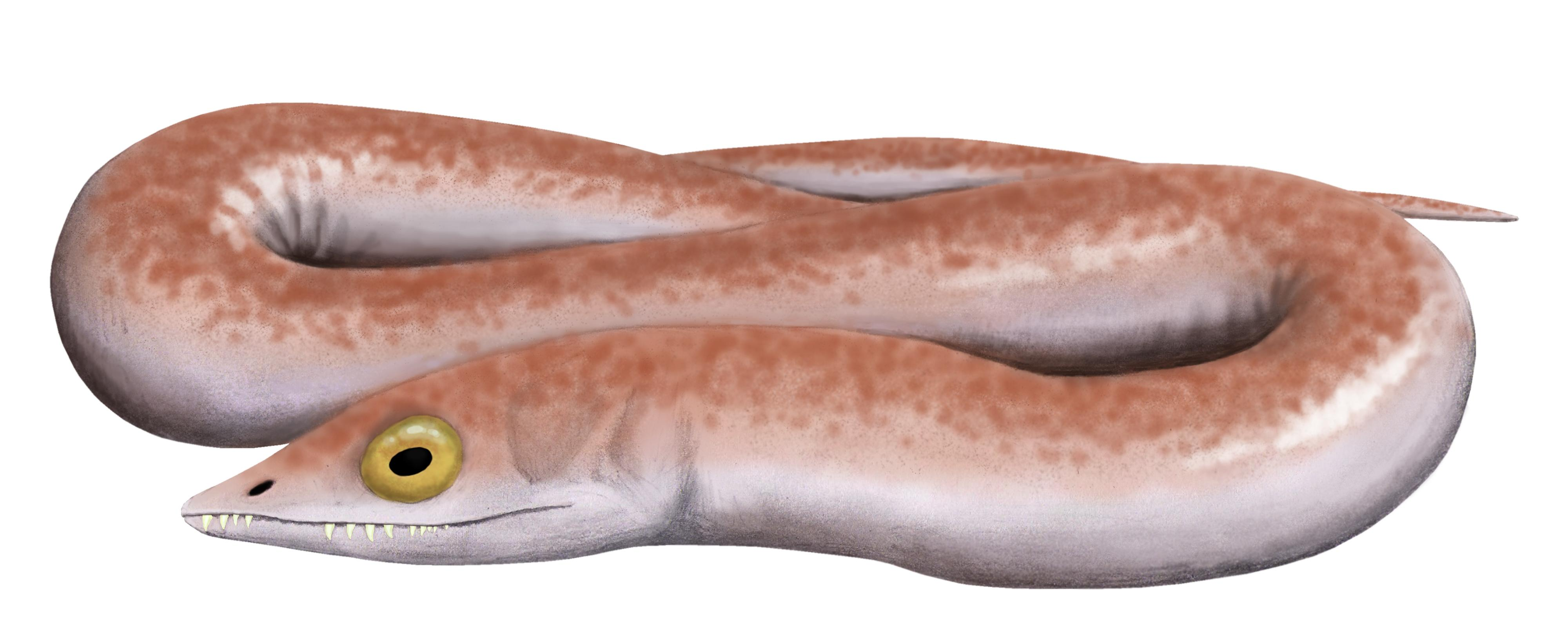
- Life restoration of the Carboniferous-Permian amphibian Phlegethontia.
  †Phlegethontia
- †Pinna
- †Platyceras
- †Polygnathus
- †Prodentalium
- †Ptyonius – tentative report
- †Rugosa
- †Sallya – tentative report
- †Scoyenia
- Serpula
- Solemya
- †Solenomorpha – report made of unidentified related form or using admittedly obsolete nomenclature
- †Spathognathodus
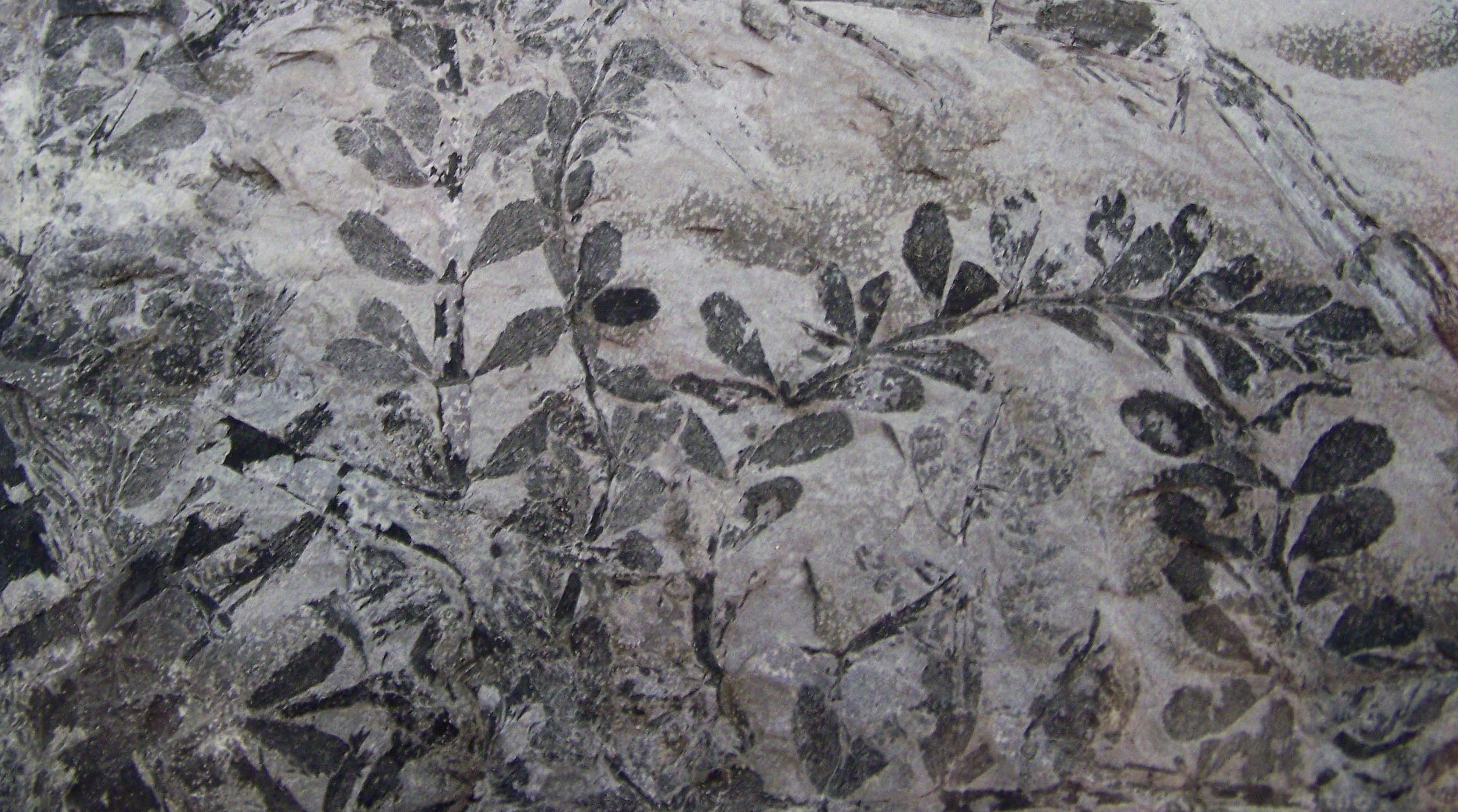
- Fossilized leaves and branches of the Devonian-Triassic horsetail relative Sphenophyllum
  †Sphenophyllum
  - †Sphenophyllum gilmorei – type locality for species
  - †Sphenophyllum oblongifolium
- †Sphenopteris
- †Spirifer
  - †Spirifer centronatus
- †Spiriferina
- †Stigmaria
- †Stroboceras
- †Syringopora
- †Tainoceras
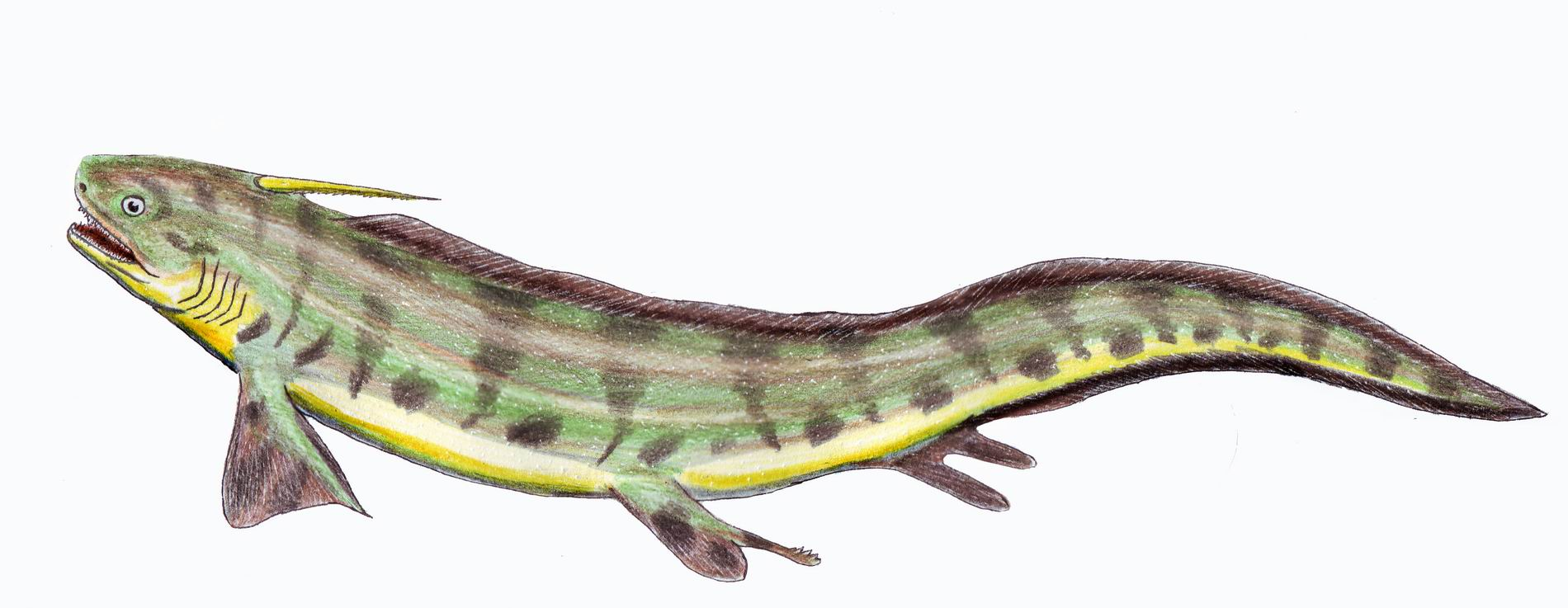
- Life restoration of the Carboniferous-Triassic freshwater shark Triodus
  †Triodus
- †Venustodus
- †Vidria
- †Walchia
- †Wardia
- †Wilkingia
- †Worthenia
- †Yarravia
- Yoldia

== Mesozoic ==
=== Selected Mesozoic taxa of Arizona ===
- †Acaenasuchus – type locality for genus
  - †Acaenasuchus geoffreyi – type locality for species
- †Acallosuchus – type locality for genus
  - †Acallosuchus rectori – type locality for species
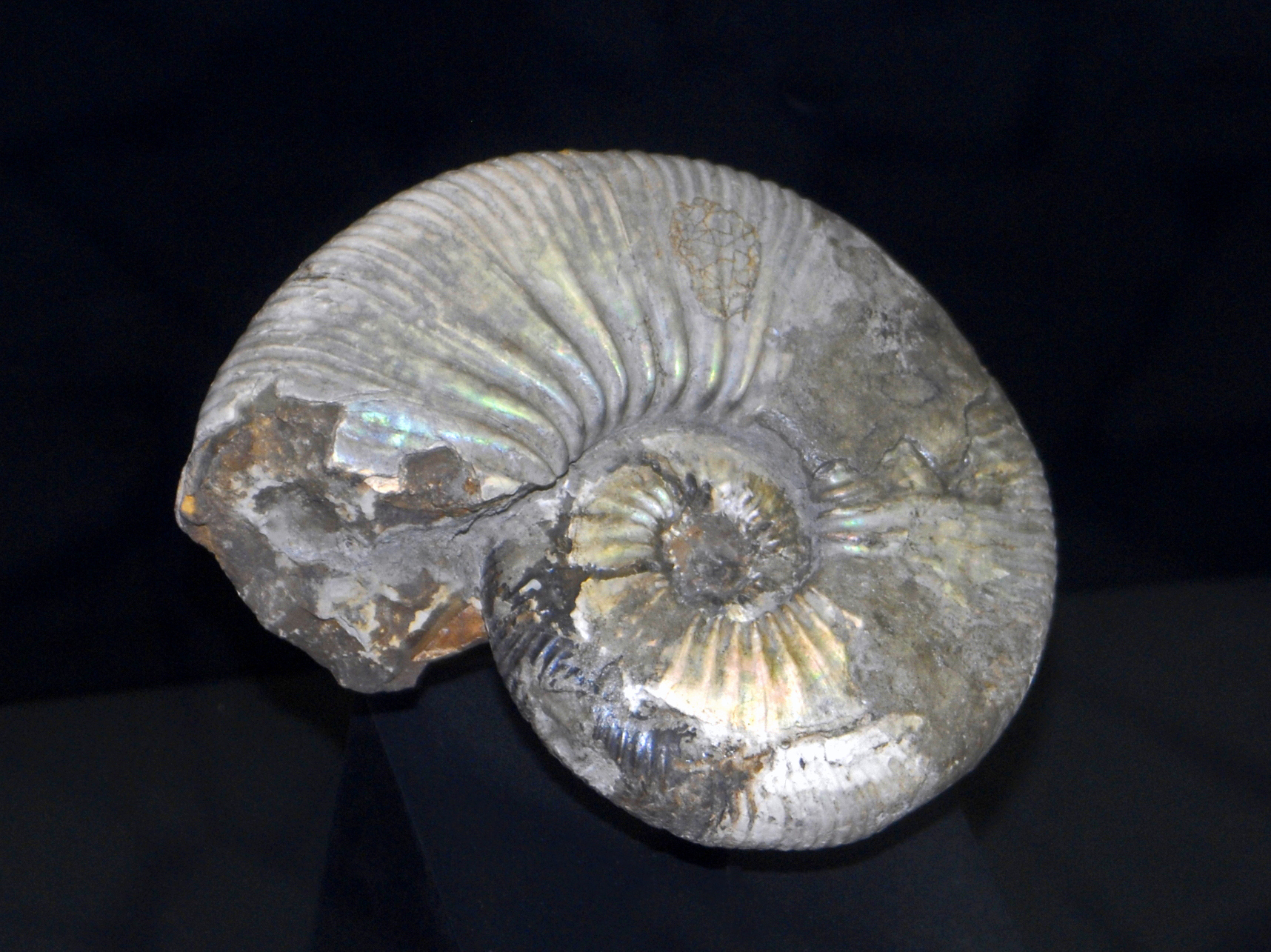
- Fossilized shell of the Early Cretaceous ammonoid cephalopod Acanthohoplites
  †Acanthohoplites
  - †Acanthohoplites berkeyi
  - †Acanthohoplites erraticus
  - †Acanthohoplites hesper
  - †Acanthohoplites impetrabilis
  - †Acanthohoplites schucherti
  - †Acanthohoplites teres
- Acirsa
- Acmaea
- †Acrodus
- †Acteon
- †Adamanasuchus – type locality for genus
  - †Adamanasuchus eisenhardtae – type locality for species
- †Adocus
- †Allocrioceras
- †Ammorhynchus – type locality for genus
  - †Ammorhynchus navajoi – type locality for species
- †Anaschisma – report made of unidentified related form or using admittedly obsolete nomenclature
- †Angistorhinus – tentative report
- †Anisoceras
- †Anomia
- †Apachesaurus
  - †Apachesaurus gregorii
- †Apatosaurus
- †Araucarioxylon
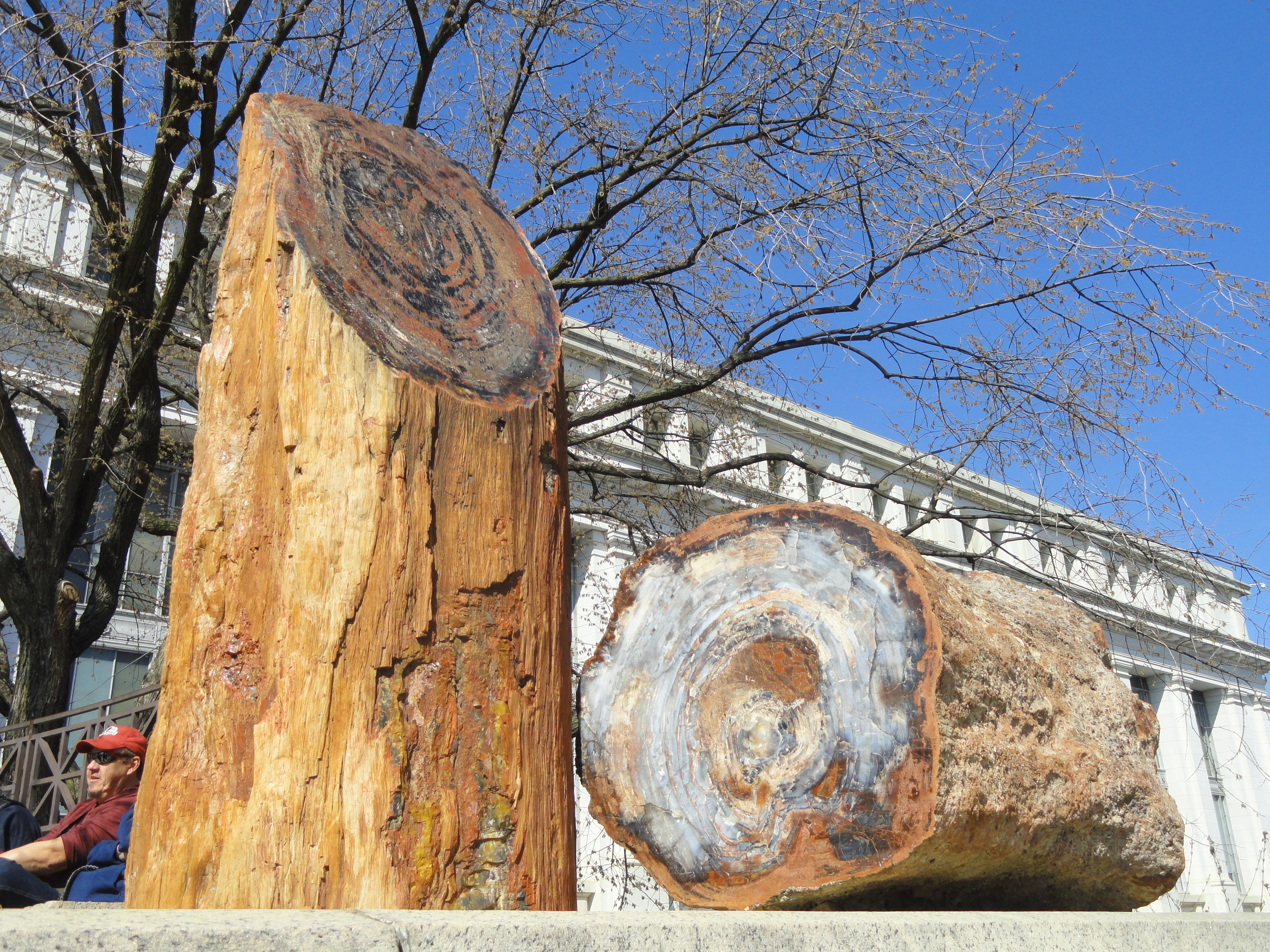
  - Petrified trunk segments of the Permian-Late Triassic conifer tree Araucarioxylon arizonicum
    †Araucarioxylon arizonicum
- †Arca
- Arctica
- †Arganodus
- †Arizonasaurus – type locality for genus
  - †Arizonasaurus babbitti – type locality for species
- Astarte
- †Australosomus – or unidentified comparable form
- †Baculites
  - †Baculites calamus
- Barbatia
- †Beudanticeras
- †Boreosomus – tentative report
- Cadulus
- †Calamites
- †Calamophylliopsis
- †Calsoyasuchus – type locality for genus
  - †Calsoyasuchus valliceps – type locality for species
- †Calycoceras
- †Calyptosuchus
  - †Calyptosuchus wellesi
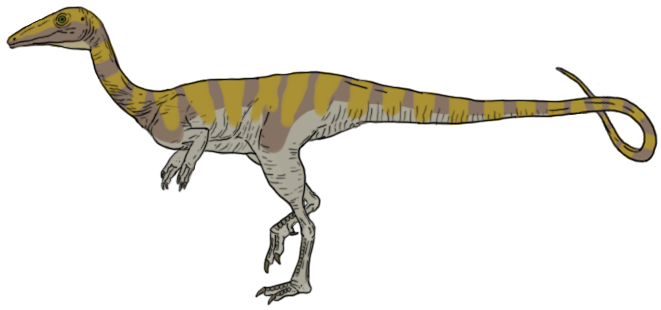
- Restoration of the Late Triassic theropod dinosaur Camposaurus
  †Camposaurus – type locality for genus
  - †Camposaurus arizonensis – type locality for species
- †Caprina
- Carota
- †Ceratodus
- Cerithiopsis
- Charonia – tentative report
- †Chatterjeea
- †Chindesaurus – type locality for genus
  - †Chindesaurus bryansmalli – type locality for species
- †Chinlea – tentative report
- †Chirotherium
  - †Chirotherium barthii
  - †Chirotherium rex – type locality for species
  - †Chirotherium sickleri
- Chlamys
- †Cibolaites
- †Coelophysis
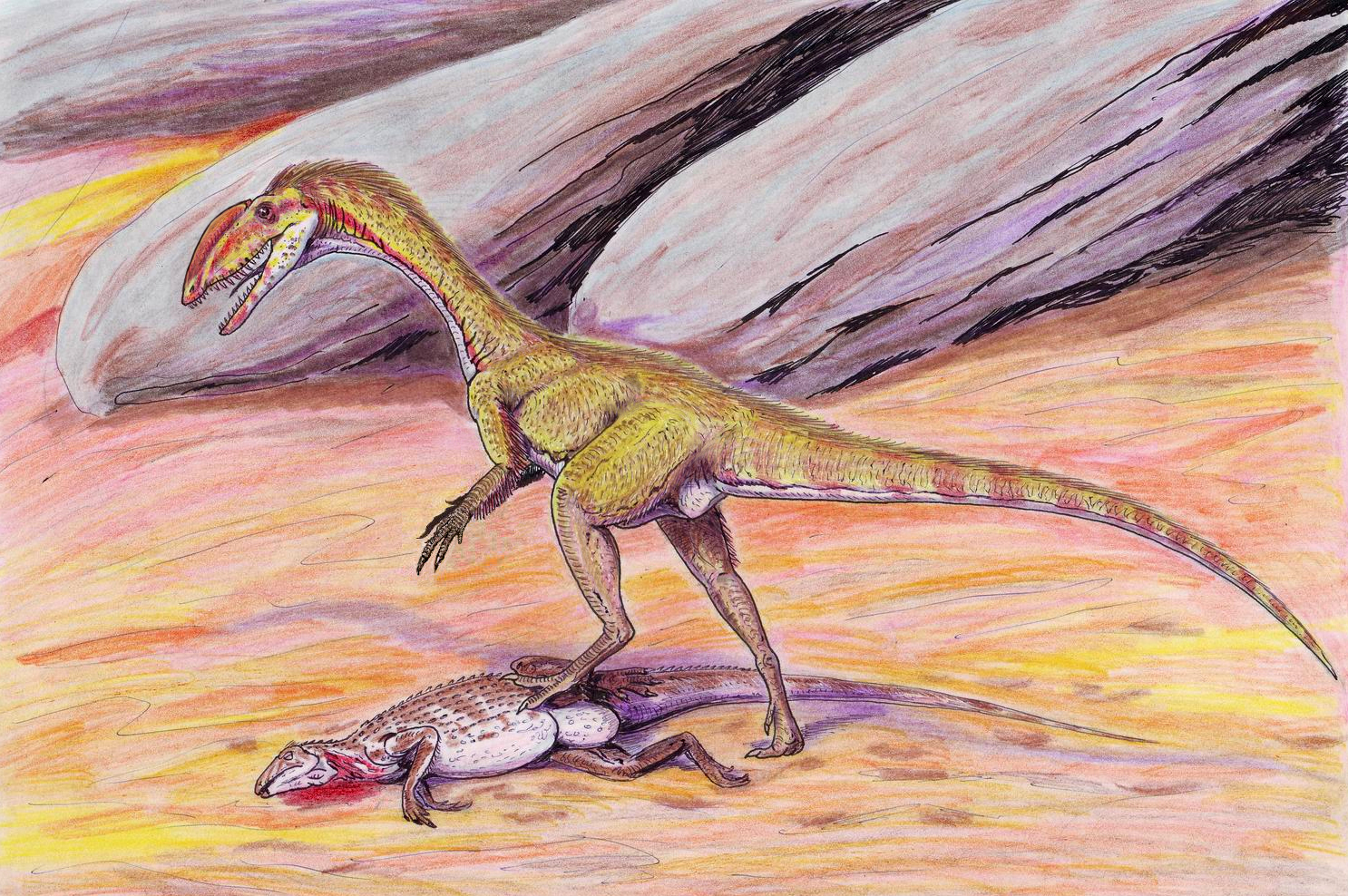
  - Life restoration of Coelophysis kayentakatae
    †Coelophysis kayentakatae – type locality for species
- †Collignoniceras
  - †Collignoniceras woollgari
- †Colognathus
- Corbula
- †Cosgriffius – type locality for genus
- †Craniscus
- Crassostrea
- †Crosbysaurus
  - †Crosbysaurus harrisae
- Cucullaea
- †Cunningtoniceras
- Cuspidaria
- †Cyclothyris
- Cylichna
- †Dentalium
- †Desmatochelys
- †Desmatosuchus
  - †Desmatosuchus haplocerus
  - †Desmatosuchus spurensis
- †Dilophosauripus – type locality for genus
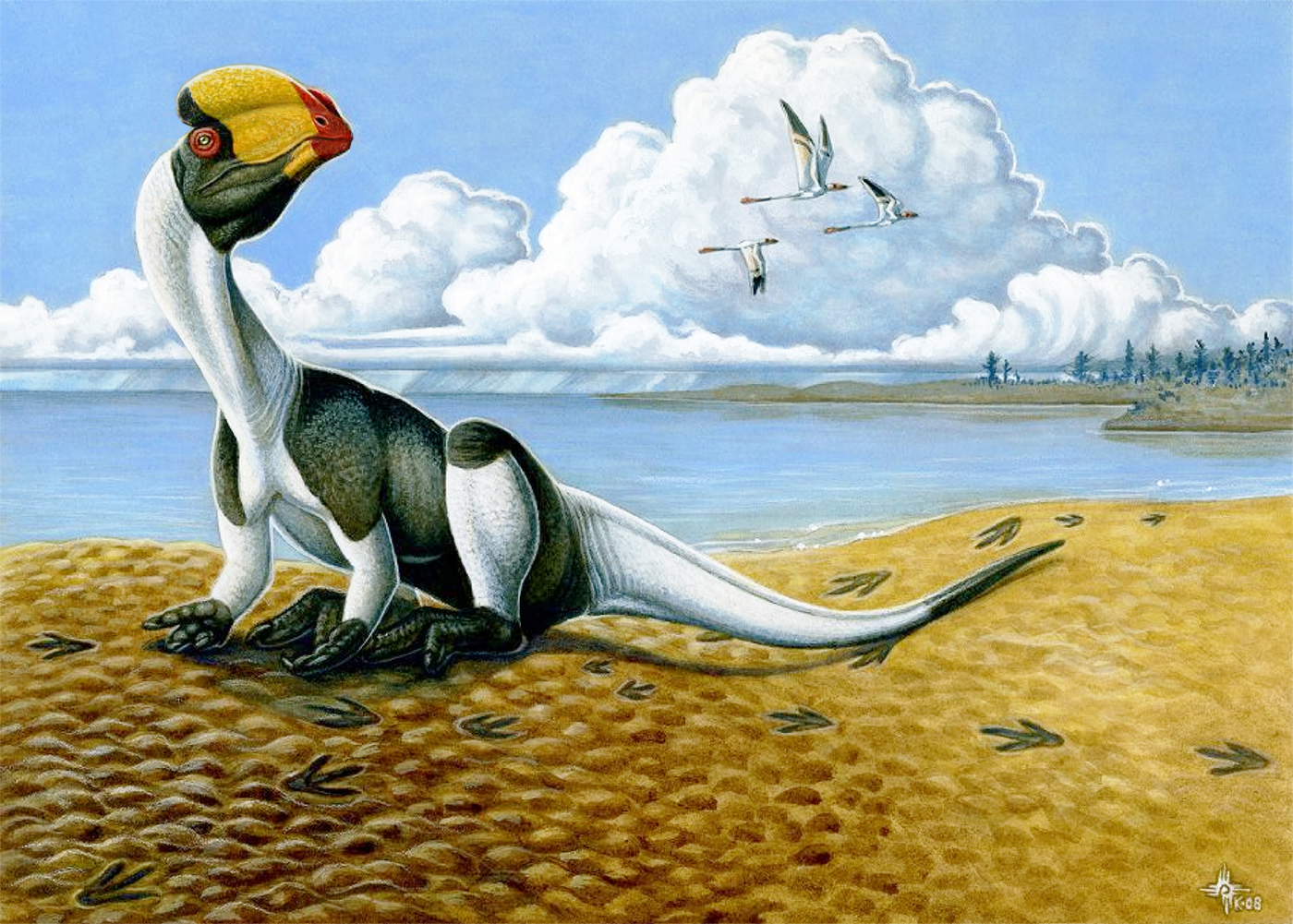
- Life restoration of the Early Jurassic theropod dinosaur Dilophosaurus resting
  †Dilophosaurus
  - †Dilophosaurus wetherilli – type locality for species
- †Dinnebitodon – type locality for genus
  - †Dinnebitodon amarali – type locality for species
- Discinisca
- †Dolicholatirus – tentative report
- †Dromomeron
  - †Dromomeron gregorii
- †Dufrenoyia
  - †Dufrenoyia compitalis
  - †Dufrenoyia joserita
  - †Dufrenoyia justinae
- †Edentosuchus – tentative report
- Elliptio
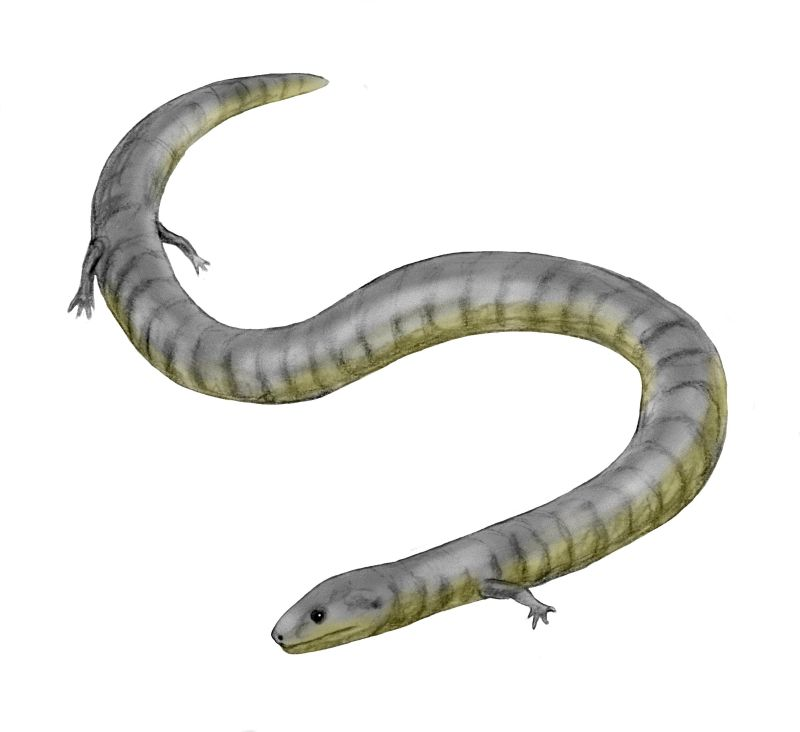
- Life restoration of the Early Jurassic amphibian Eocaecilia
  †Eocaecilia – type locality for genus
  - †Eocaecilia micropodia – type locality for species
- †Eocyclotosaurus
- †Eopneumatosuchus – type locality for genus
  - †Eopneumatosuchus colberti – type locality for species
- †Eucalycoceras
- †Eulima – tentative report
- †Eunaticina
- †Euomphaloceras
- †Euspira
- †Exogyra
  - †Exogyra acroumbonata
  - †Exogyra lancha
  - †Exogyra levis
  - †Exogyra olisiponensis
- †Fagesia
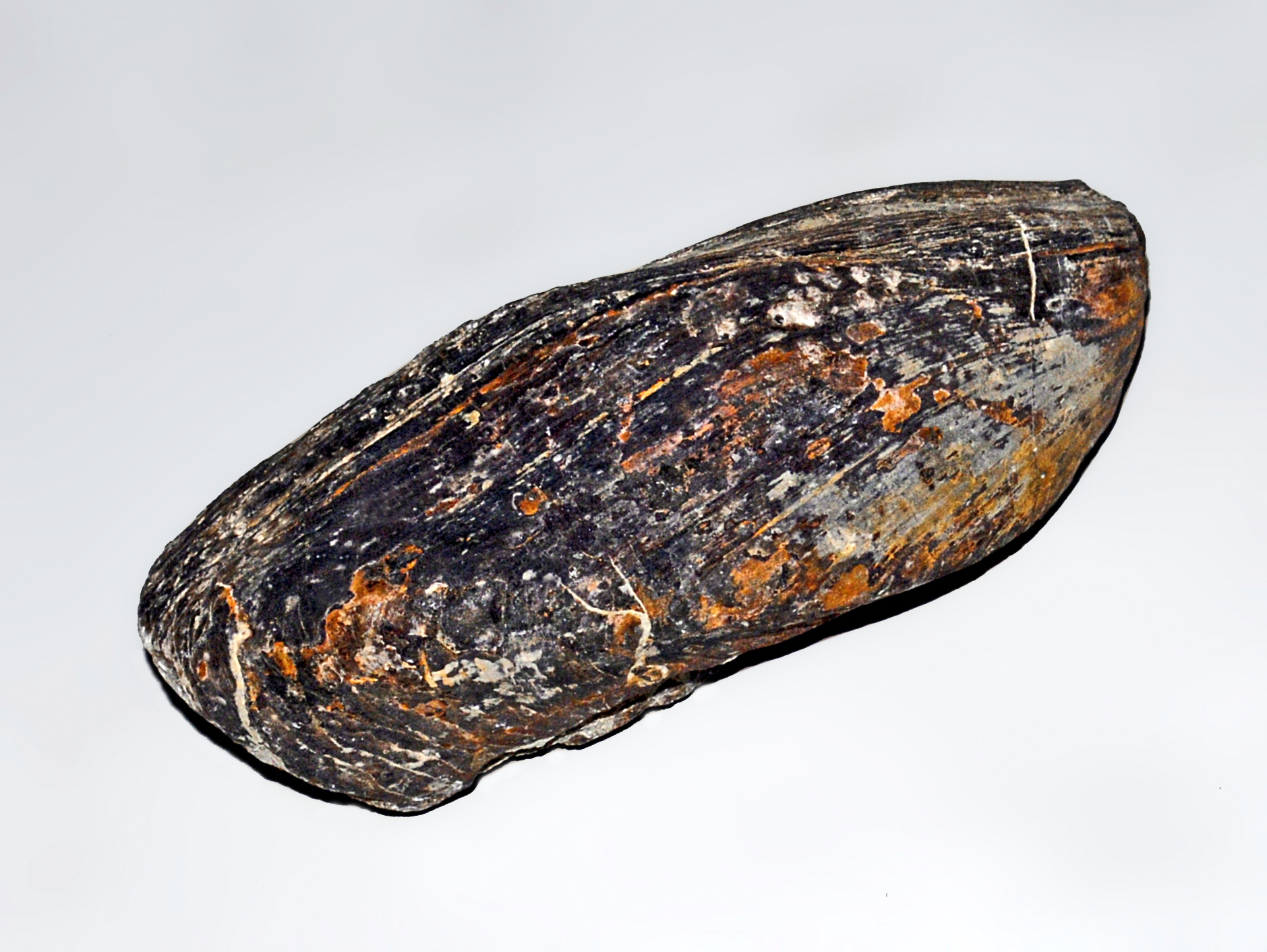
- Fossilized shell of the Carboniferous-Eocene bivalve Gervillia
  †Gervillia
  - †Gervillia cholla
  - †Gervillia heinemani
  - †Gervillia navajovus – type locality for species
  - †Gervillia rasori
- Ginkgo
- †Grallator
- †Gryphaea
- †Gyrolepis
- †Hadrokkosaurus – type locality for genus
  - †Hadrokkosaurus bradyi – type locality for species
- †Hamites
- †Hamulus
- †Hesperosuchus – type locality for genus
  - †Hesperosuchus agilis – type locality for species
- Homarus
- †Hopiichnus – type locality for genus
- †Hybodus
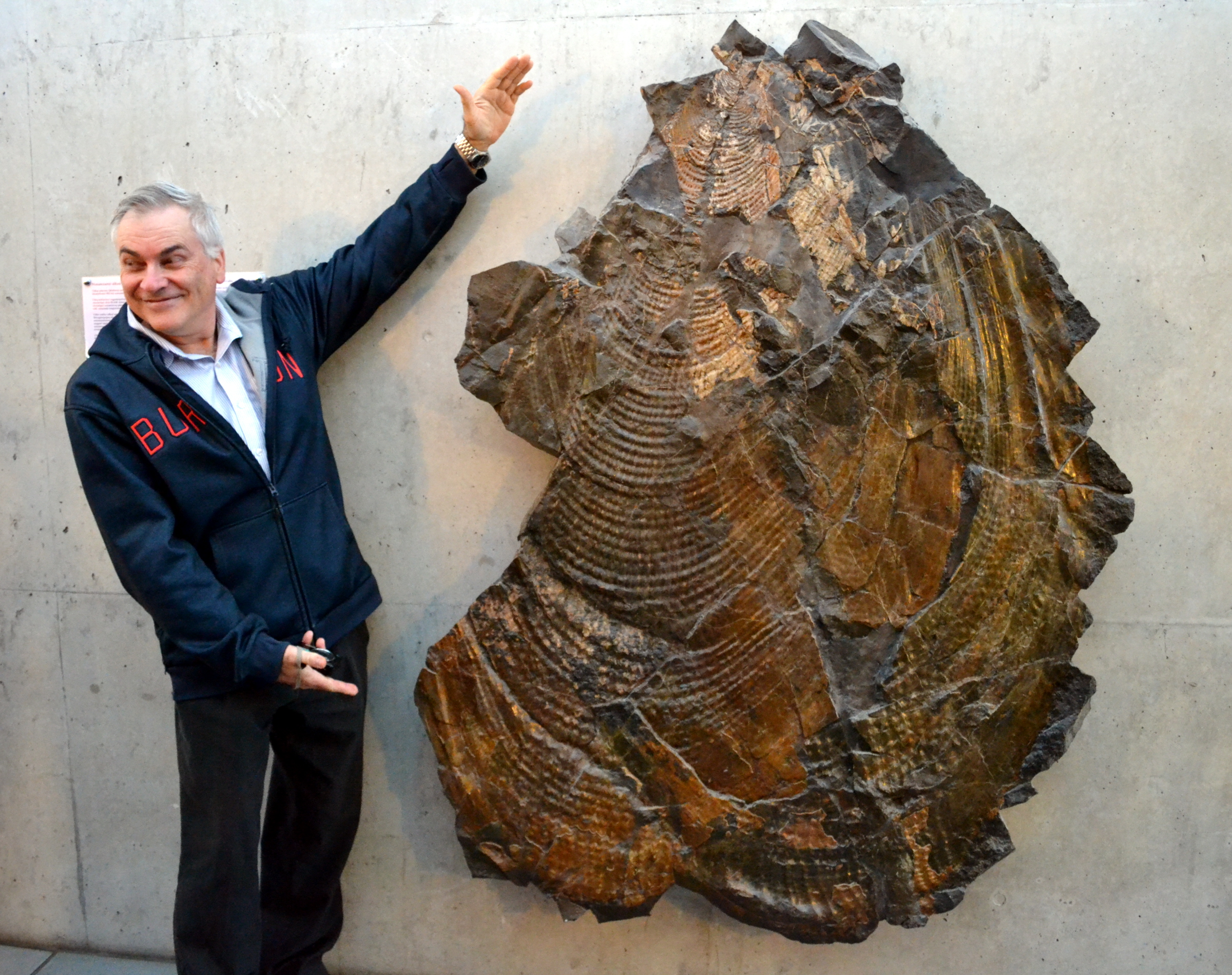
- Fossilized shell of the Early Jurassic-Late Cretaceous marine bivalve Inoceramus with a human indicating its size
  †Inoceramus
  - †Inoceramus corpulentas
  - †Inoceramus dimidius – or unidentified comparable form
  - †Inoceramus flavus
  - †Inoceramus heinzi – or unidentified related form
  - †Inoceramus lamarcki
  - †Inoceramus nodai
  - †Inoceramus pictus
- †Kamerunoceras
- †Kayentachelys – type locality for genus
  - †Kayentachelys aprix – type locality for species
- †Kayentapus – type locality for genus
- †Kayentasuchus – type locality for genus
  - †Kayentasuchus walkeri – type locality for species
- †Kayentatherium – type locality for genus
  - †Kayentatherium wellesi – type locality for species
- †Kayentavenator – type locality for genus
- †Koskinonodon
- Lepisosteus
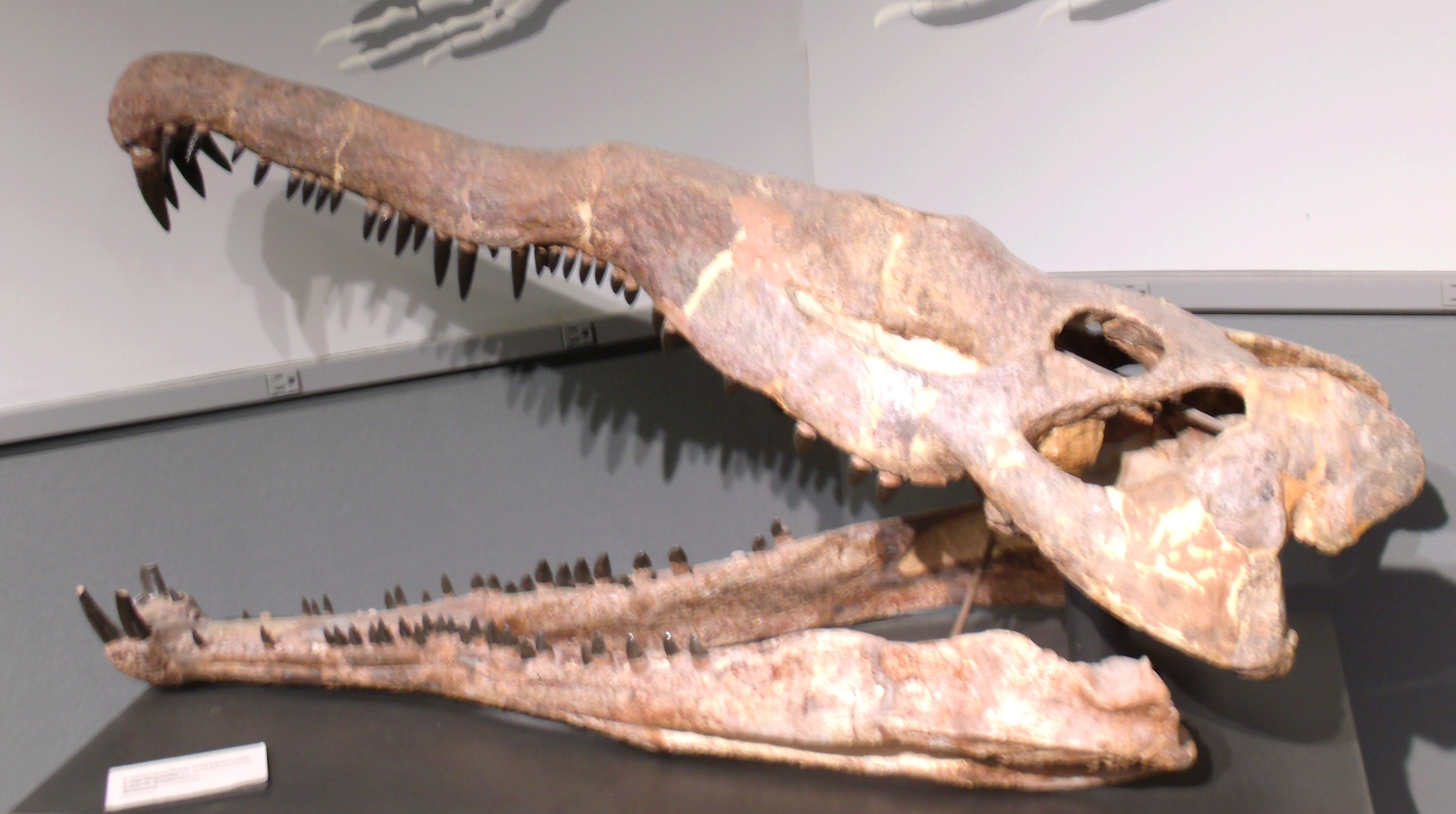
- Fossilized skull of the Late Triassic phytosaur Leptosuchus
  †Leptosuchus
  - †Leptosuchus crosbiensis
- Lima
- Limatula
- †Linearis
- †Lingula
- †Lissodus – tentative report
- Lithophaga
- †Lonchidion
- Lopha
- †Lucina
- Lunatia – tentative report
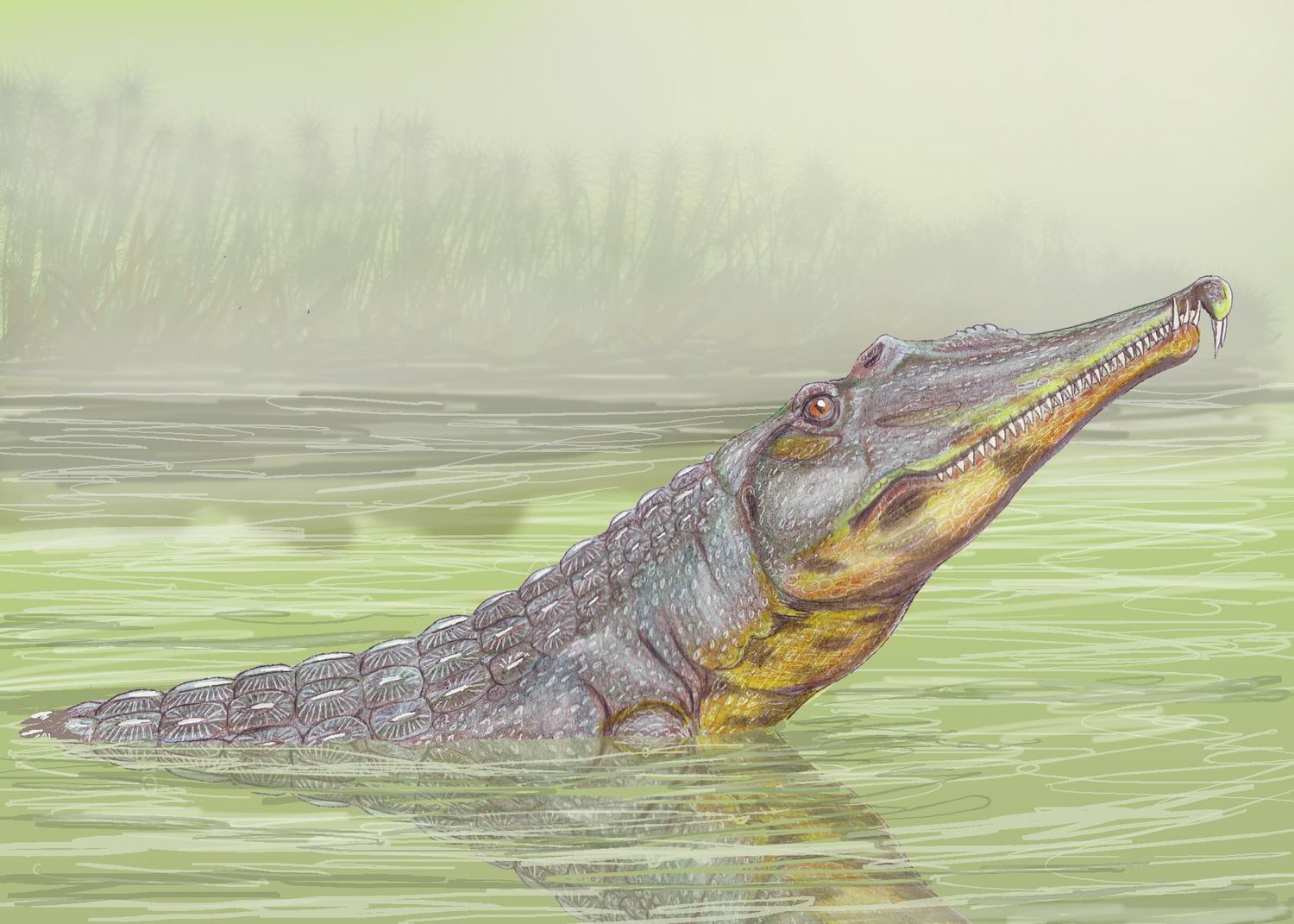
- Life restoration of the Late Triassic phytosaur Machaeroprosopus
  †Machaeroprosopus – type locality for genus
  - †Machaeroprosopus buceros
  - †Machaeroprosopus jablonskiae – type locality for species
  - †Machaeroprosopus mccauleyi – type locality for species
  - †Machaeroprosopus pristinus – type locality for species
  - †Machaeroprosopus tenuis – type locality for species
  - †Machaeroprosopus validus – type locality for species
- †Mammites
- †Megalosauripus
- †Melvius
- Membranipora – or unidentified comparable form
- †Metoicoceras
  - †Metoicoceras geslinianum
  - †Metoicoceras mosbyense
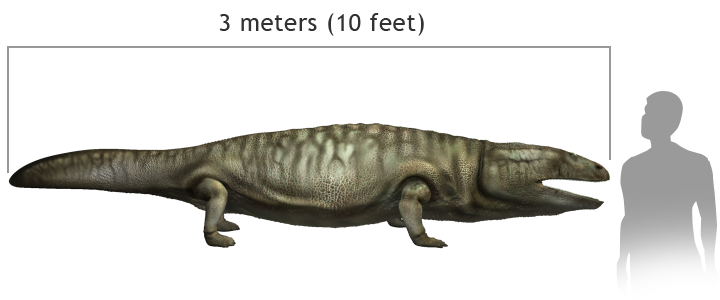
- Life restoration of the Late Triassic amphibian Metoposaurus with an anachronistic human to scale
  †Metoposaurus
- †Modiolus
- †Moenkopia – type locality for genus
- †Monopleura
- †Morganucodon
- †Morrowites
- †Mytilus – tentative report
- †Navahopus – type locality for genus
- †Neithea
- †Neocardioceras
  - †Neocardioceras juddii
  - †Neocardioceras minutum
- †Neoptychites
- †Nerinea
- Nerita
- Neritina
- Nucula
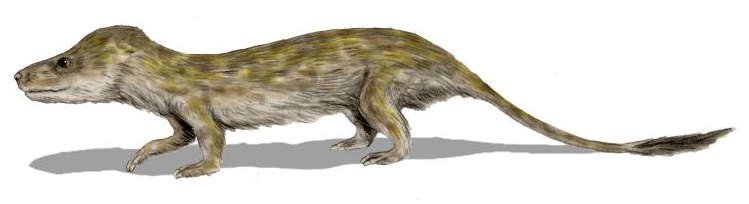
- Restoration of the Late Triassic–Early Jurassic synapsid (mammal precursor) Oligokyphus
  †Oligokyphus
- †Opis
- Ostrea
- †Oxytoma
- †Pachyrhizodus – or unidentified comparable form
- †Parasuchus
- †Paratypothorax
- †Parrishia – type locality for genus
- †Pecten
- †Permocalculus
- Pholadomya
- Physa
- †Pinna
- †Placenticeras
  - †Placenticeras cumminsi
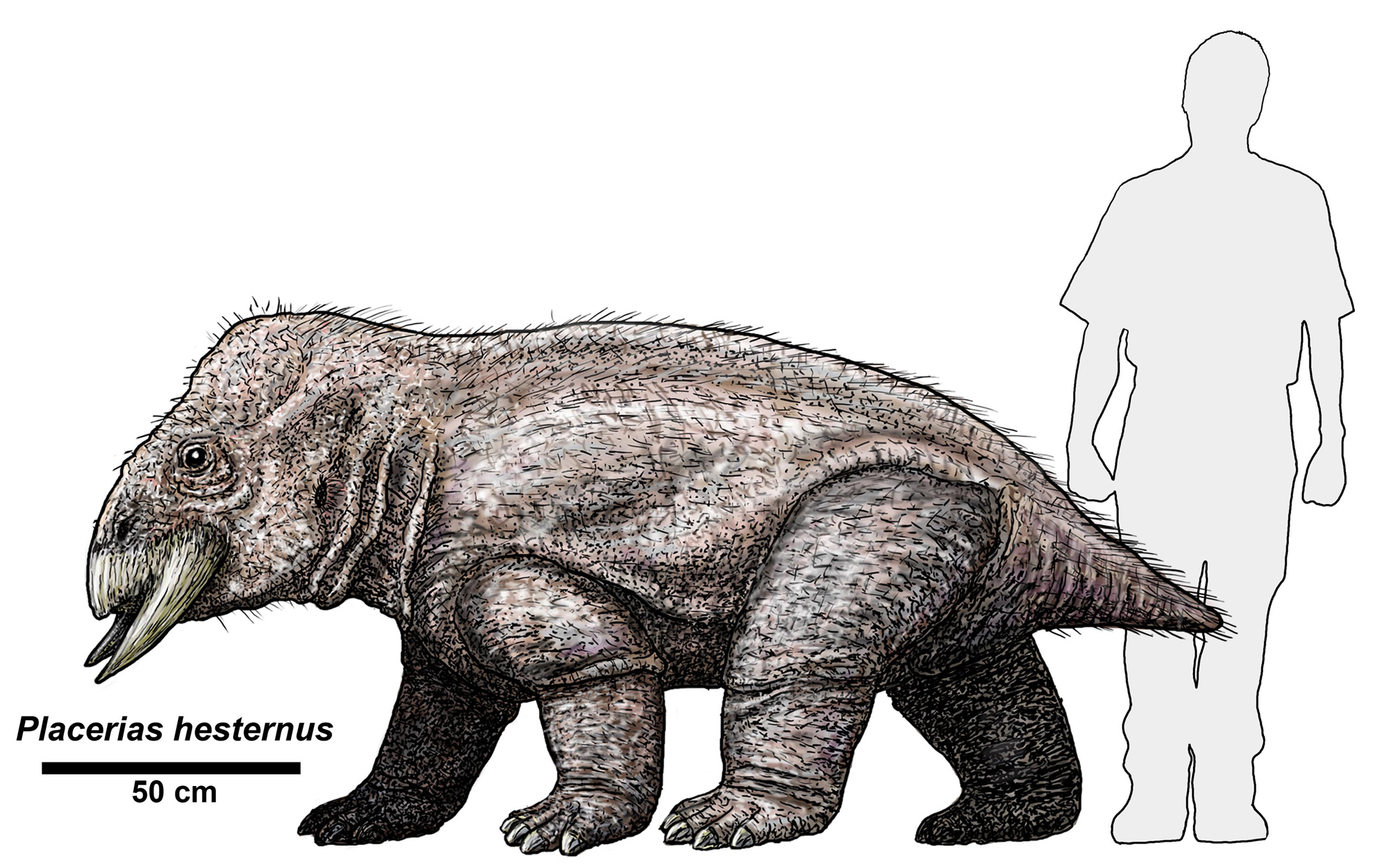
- Restoration of the Late Triassic synapsid (mammal precursor) Placerias with an anachronistic human to scale
  †Placerias – type locality for genus
  - †Placerias hesternus – type locality for species
- Plicatula
- † Pollex – tentative report
- Polydora – tentative report
- †Poposaurus
  - †Poposaurus gracilis
- †Postosuchus
  - †Postosuchus kirkpatricki
- †Pravusuchus
  - †Pravusuchus hortus
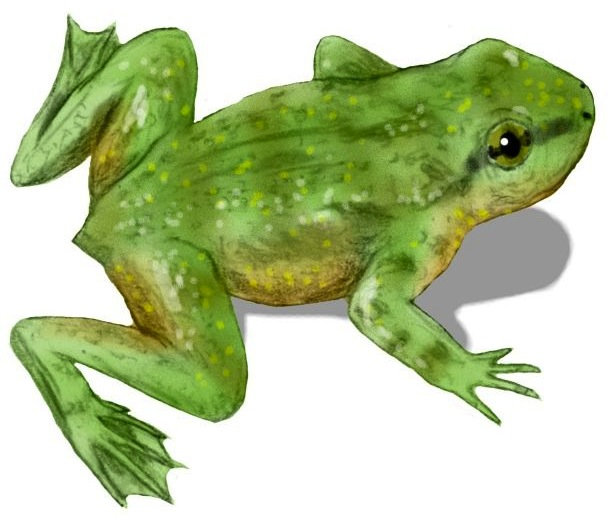
- Life restoration of the Early Jurassic frog Prosalirus
  †Prosalirus – type locality for genus
  - †Prosalirus bitis – type locality for species
- †Protome – type locality for genus
  - †Protome batalaria – type locality for species
- †Protosuchus – type locality for genus
  - †Protosuchus richardsoni – type locality for species
- †Pseudoperna
- †Pteraichnus – type locality for genus
  - †Pteraichnus saltwashensis – type locality for species
- Pycnodonte
  - †Pycnodonte kellumi – or unidentified related form
  - †Pycnodonte newberryi
- †Pyncnodonte
- †Quasicyclotosaurus – type locality for genus
  - †Quasicyclotosaurus campi – type locality for species
- †Quitmaniceras
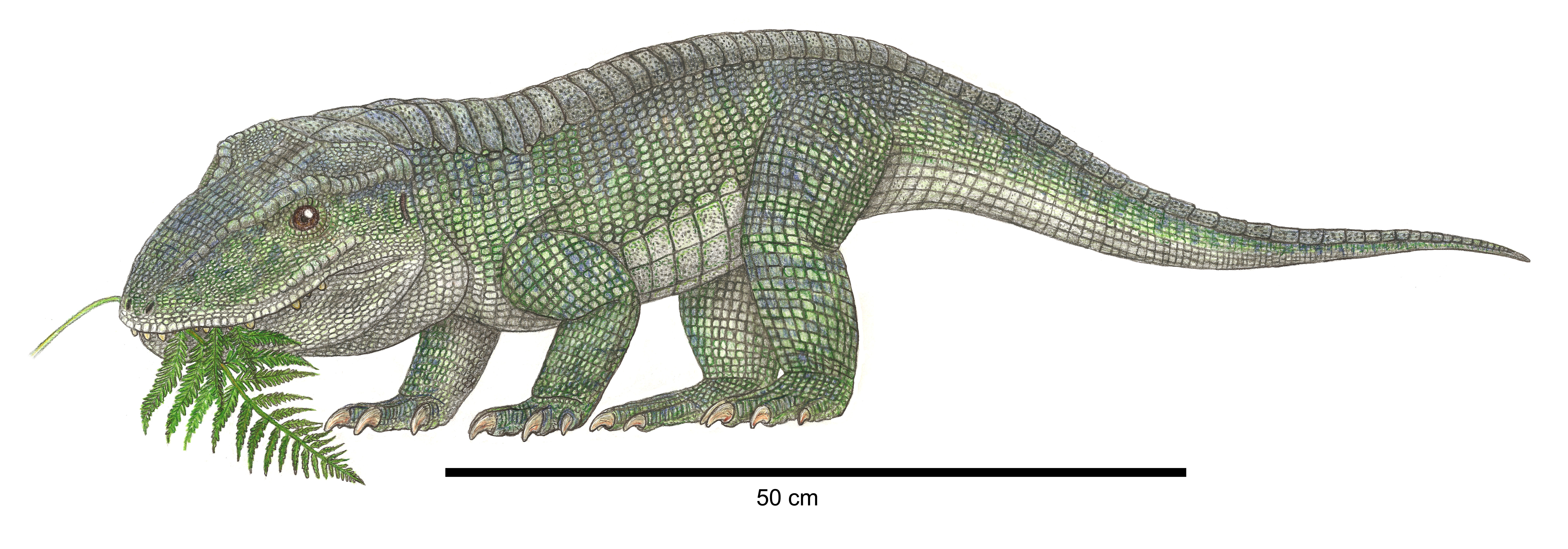
- Life restoration of the Late Triassic crocodile relative Revueltosaurus
  †Revueltosaurus
  - †Revueltosaurus callenderi
  - †Revueltosaurus hunti
- †Rhadalognathus – type locality for genus
- †Rhamphinion – type locality for genus
  - †Rhamphinion jenkinsi – type locality for species
- Ringicula
- †Rioarribasuchus
  - †Rioarribasuchus chamaensis
- Rostellaria
- †Rutiodon
- †Sarahsaurus – type locality for genus
- †Scaphites
- †Scutarx – type locality for genus
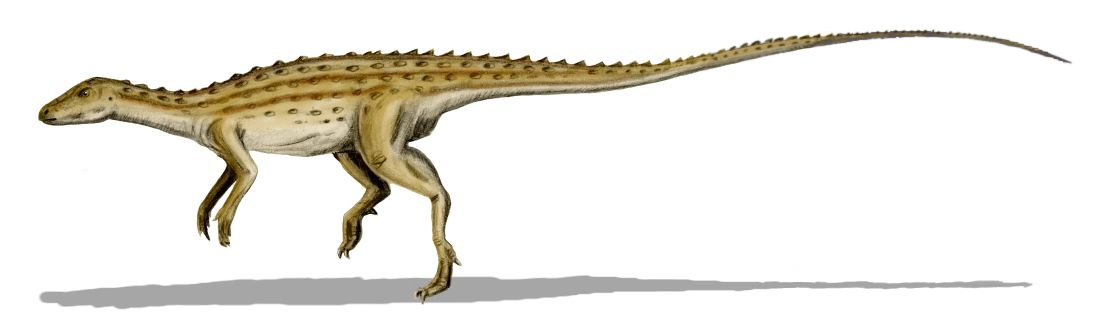
- Life restoration of the Early Jurassic primitive armored dinosaur Scutellosaurus
  †Scutellosaurus – type locality for genus
  - †Scutellosaurus lawleri – type locality for species
- †Segisaurus – type locality for genus
  - †Segisaurus halli – type locality for species
- †Selaginella
- †Semionotus – or unidentified comparable form
- †Senis
- Serpula
- †Shuvosaurus
  - †Shuvosaurus inexpectatus
- †Smilosuchus – type locality for genus
  - †Smilosuchus adamanensis – type locality for species
  - †Smilosuchus gregorii – type locality for species
  - †Smilosuchus lithodendrorum – type locality for species
- Solemya
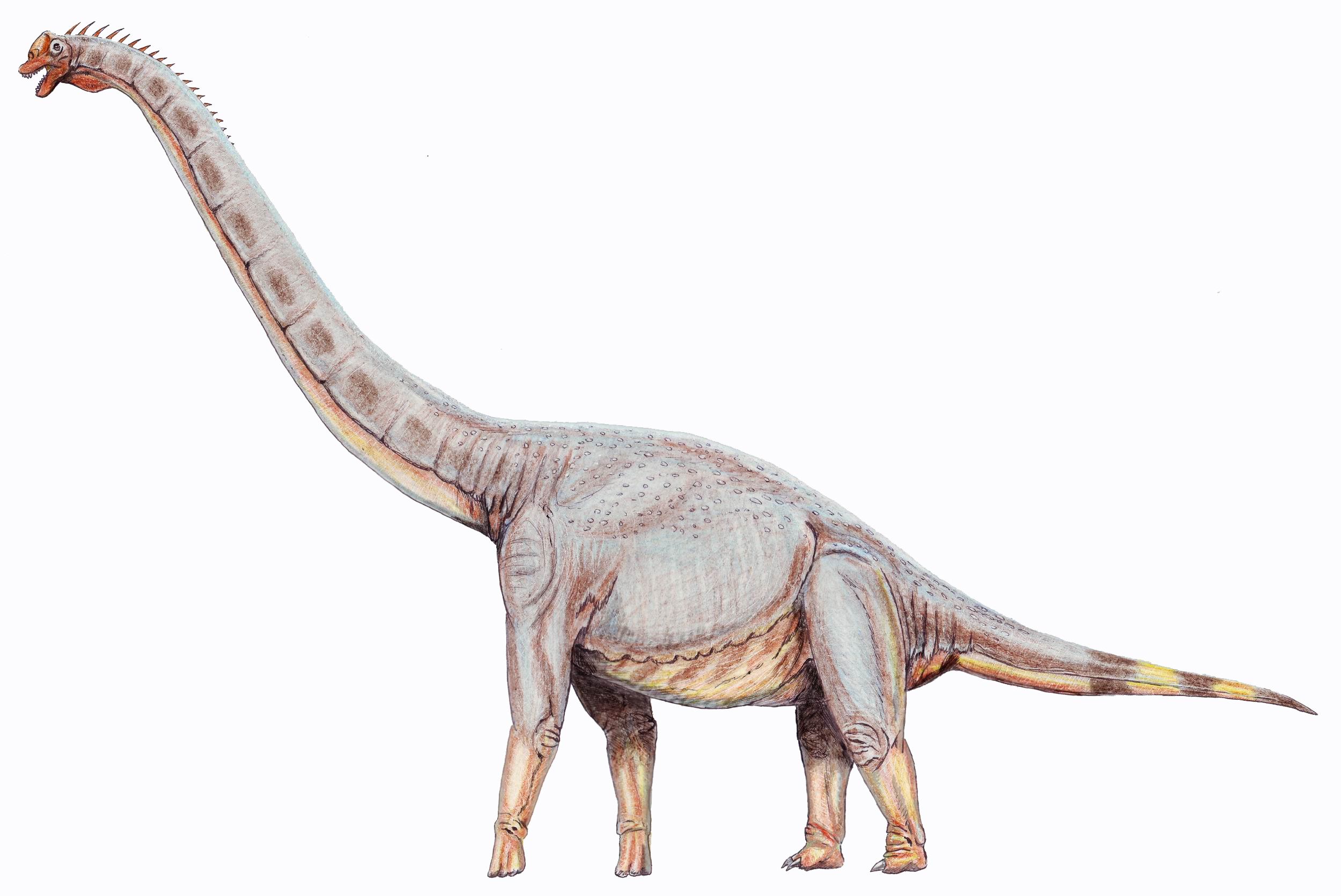
- Life restoration of the Early-Late Cretaceous brachiosaur Sonorasaurus
  †Sonorasaurus – type locality for genus
  - †Sonorasaurus thompsoni – type locality for species
- Spirorbis
- Squilla – tentative report
- †Stagonolepis
- †Stanocephalosaurus – type locality for genus
  - †Stanocephalosaurus birdi – type locality for species
- †Syntarsus
- †Tanytrachelos
- †Tecovasaurus
  - †Tecovasaurus murryi
- †Tecovasuchus
  - †Tecovasuchus chatterjeei
- Tellina
- †Tenea
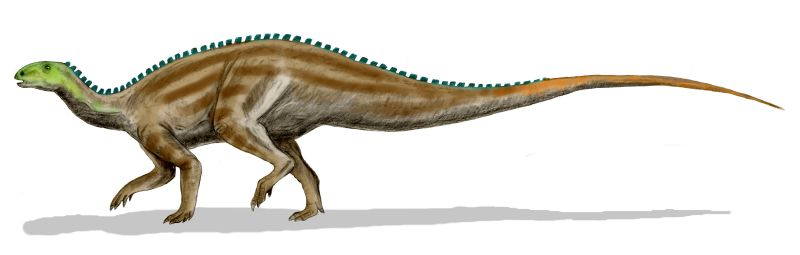
- Life restoration of the Early Cretaceous Iguanodon relative Tenontosaurus
  †Tenontosaurus
- †Thomasites
- †Tragodesmoceras
- †Trigonia
  - †Trigonia aliformis - or unidentified loosely related form
  - †Trigonia cragini
  - †Trigonia guildi
  - †Trigonia kitchini
  - †Trigonia mearnsi
  - †Trigonia reesidei
  - †Trigonia resoluta
  - †Trigonia saavedra
  - †Trigonia stolleyi
  - †Trigonia weaveri
- †Trilophosaurus
  - †Trilophosaurus buettneri
  - †Trilophosaurus jacobsi – type locality for species
- †Triodus
- Turritella
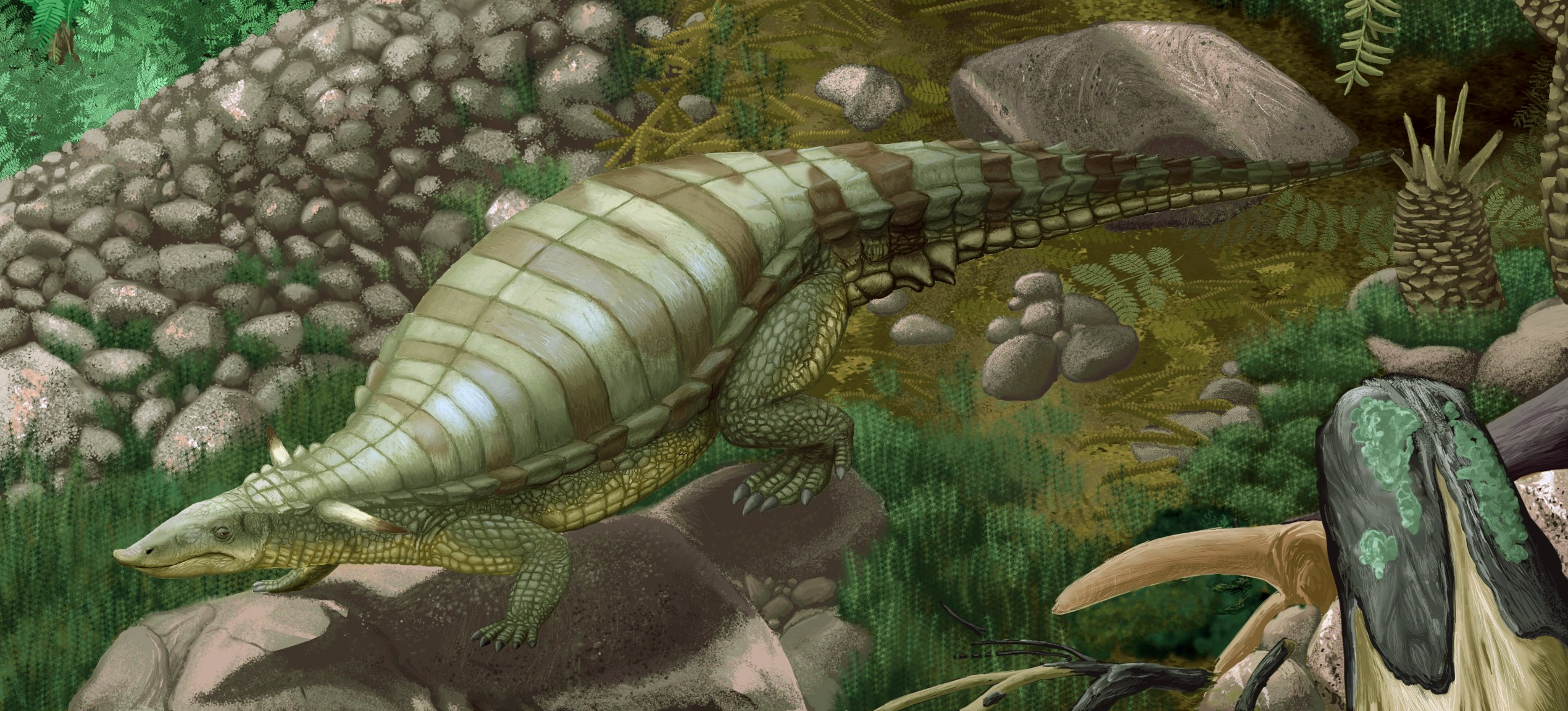
- Restoration of a pair of the Late Triassic aetosaur Typothorax
  †Typothorax
- †Uatchitodon
  - †Uatchitodon schneideri
- Unio
- †Vancleavea – type locality for genus
  - †Vancleavea campi – type locality for species
- †Vascoceras
- †Vigilius
  - †Vigilius wellesi
- Viviparus
- Vulsella
- †Watinoceras
  - †Watinoceras coloradoense
  - †Watinoceras devonense
  - †Watinoceras hattini
  - †Watinoceras praecursor – or unidentified comparable form
- †Wellesaurus
  - †Wellesaurus peabodyi – type locality for species
- †Yezoites

== Cenozoic ==
=== Selected Cenozoic taxa of Arizona ===
- †Adelphailurus
- †Agriotherium
- †Alforjas
- †Ambystoma
  - †Ambystoma tigrinum
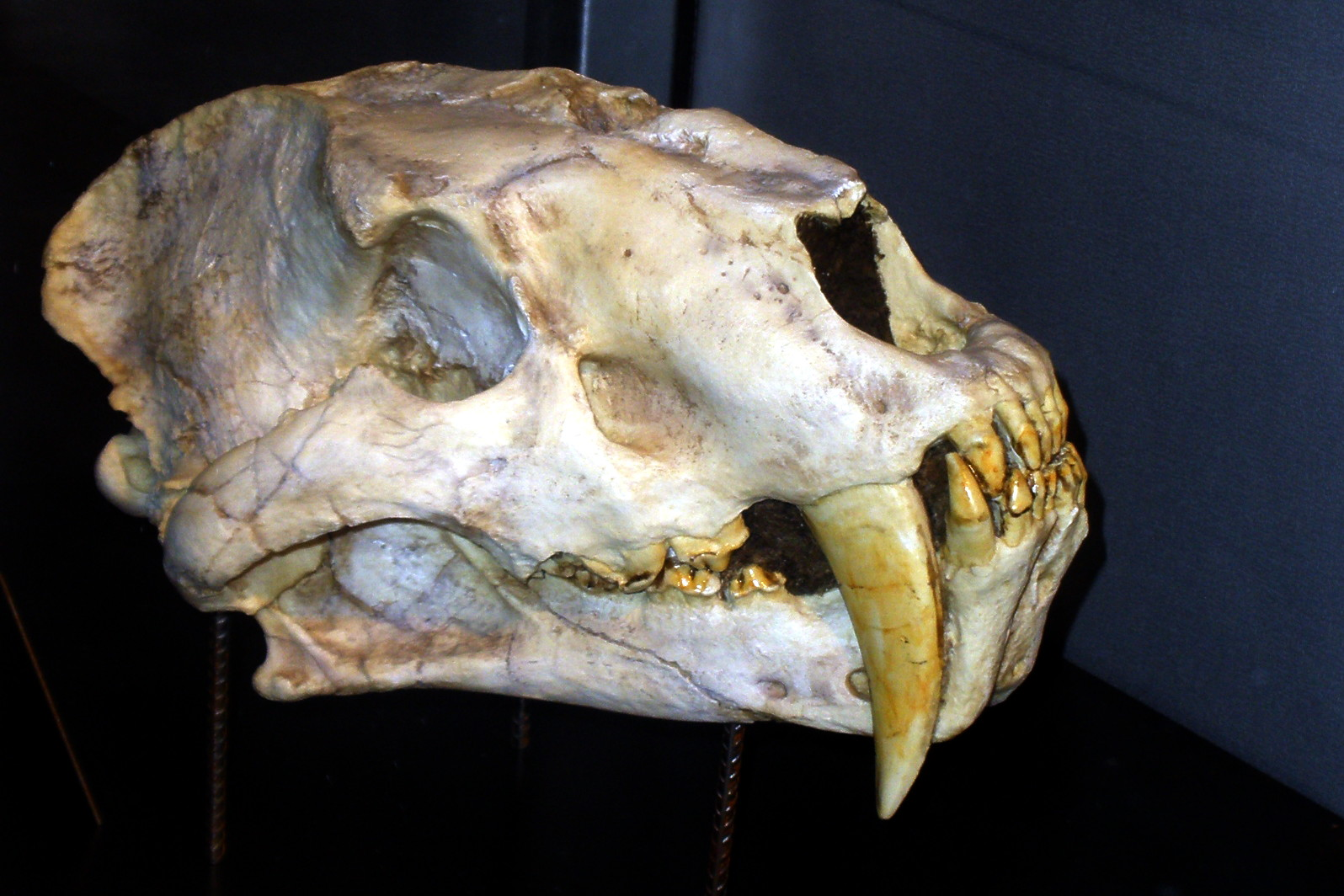
- Fossilized skull of the Miocene saber-toothed cat Amphimachairodus
  †Amphimachairodus
- †Amplibuteo
- Antrozous
  - †Antrozous pallidus
- Aquila
- †Arctodus
- †Aztlanolagus
- Baiomys
- Bassariscus
- Bison
- †Borophagus
  - †Borophagus diversidens
  - †Borophagus parvus – type locality for species
- Brachylagus
- Bufo
  - †Bufo woodhousei
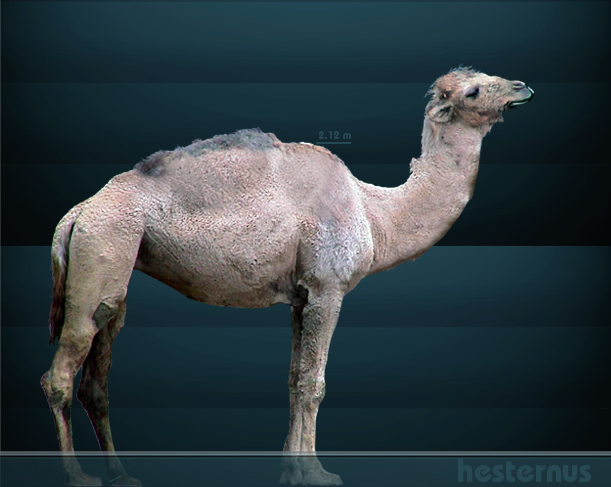
- Life restoration of the Pliocene-Holocene camel Camelops
  †Camelops
  - †Camelops hesternus – or unidentified comparable form
- Canis
  - †Canis armbrusteri
  - †Canis dirus
  - †Canis edwardii
  - †Canis ferox
  - †Canis latrans
- †Capromeryx
- †Carpocyon
- Castor
- Celtis
  - †Celtis reticulata
- Cervus
- †Chasmaporthetes
- †Chrysocyon
- †Citellus
- Cnemidophorus
- Cratogeomys
- Crotaphytus – or unidentified comparable form
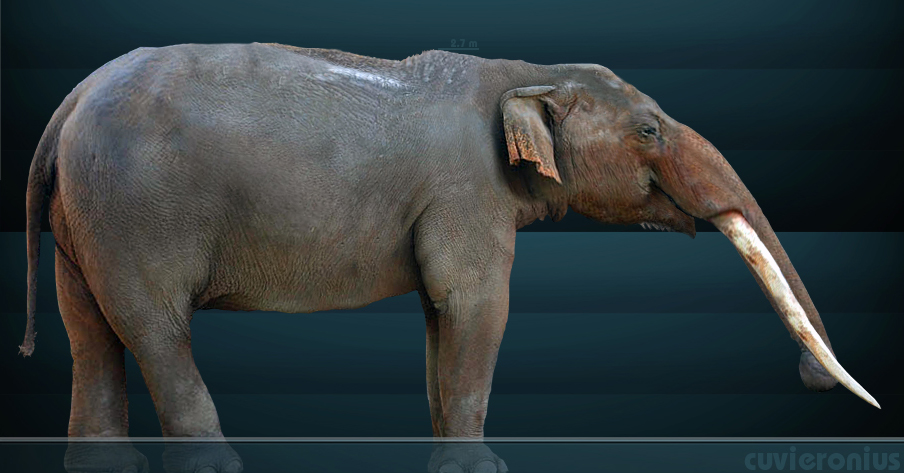
- Life restoration of the Pliocene-Holocene elephant relative Cuvieronius
  †Cuvieronius
- Desmodus
  - †Desmodus stocki
- †Diceratherium
- †Dinohippus
- Dipodomys
- †Dipoides
- †Epicyon
  - †Epicyon haydeni
- Eptesicus – or unidentified comparable form
- Equus
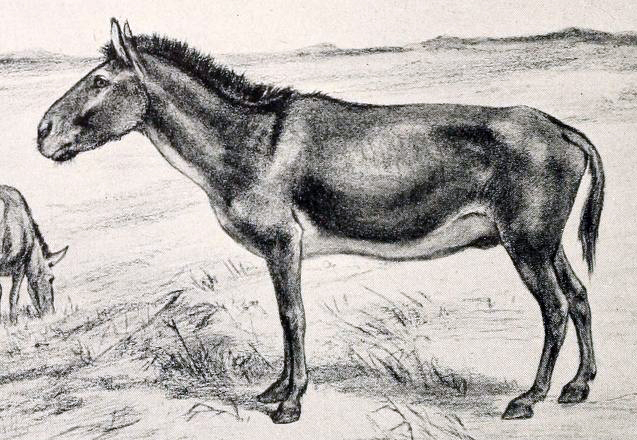
  - Restoration of the Pliocene-Holocene horse Equus scotti, or Scott's horse
    †Equus scotti – or unidentified comparable form
  - †Equus simplicidens
- Erethizon
- †Eucyon
  - †Eucyon davisi
- Eumeces
- Eumops
  - †Eumops perotis – or unidentified comparable form
- †Geococcyx
  - †Geococcyx californianus
- Geomys
- †Glossotherium
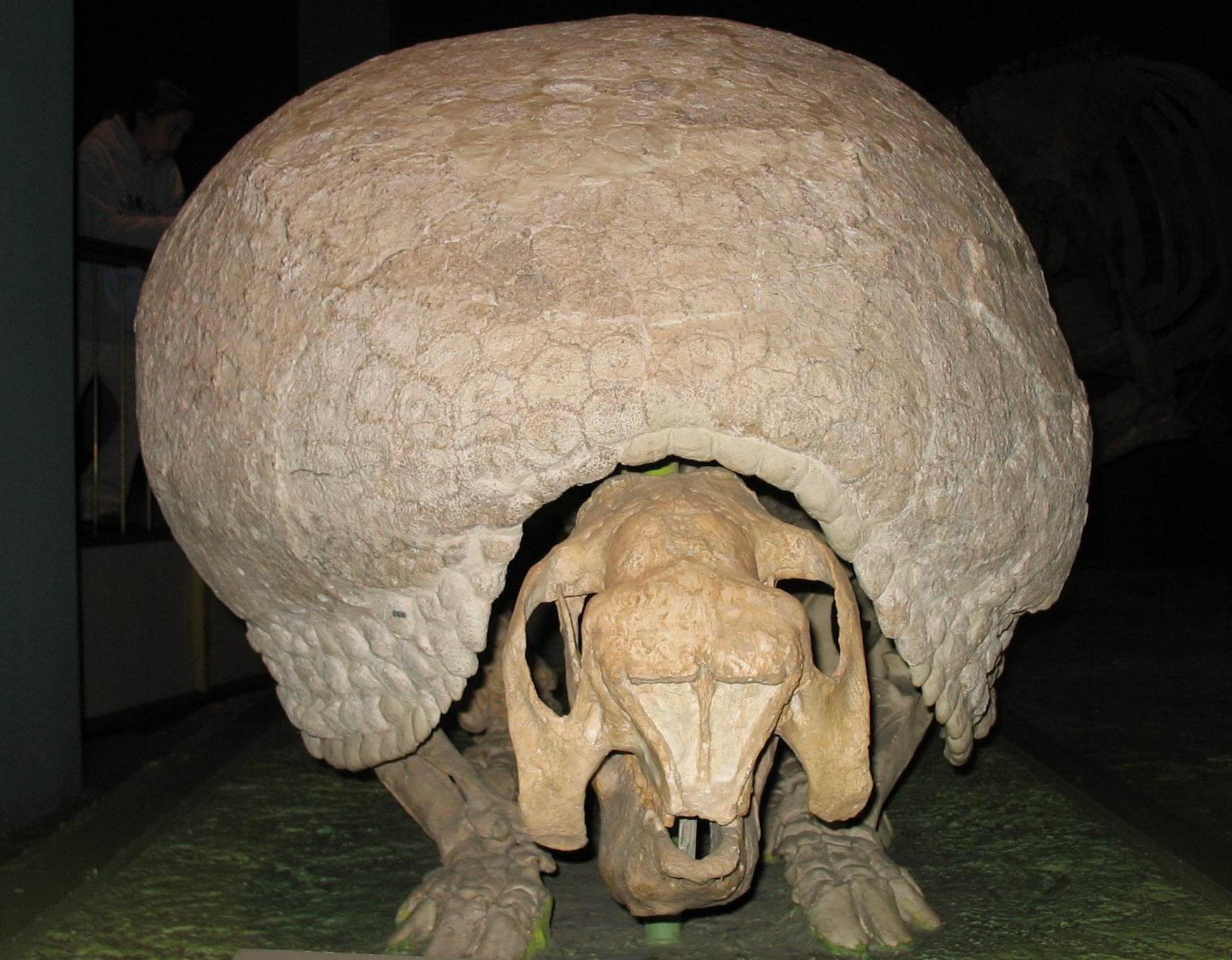
- Mounted fossilized skeleton of the Pleistocene armadillo relative Glyptotherium
  †Glyptotherium
  - †Glyptotherium texanum
- †Hemiauchenia
- †Hesperotestudo
- Heterodon
  - †Heterodon nasicus – or unidentified comparable form
- †Histiotus
- †Homotherium – tentative report
- Hyla
- †Hypolagus
- Ictalurus – tentative report
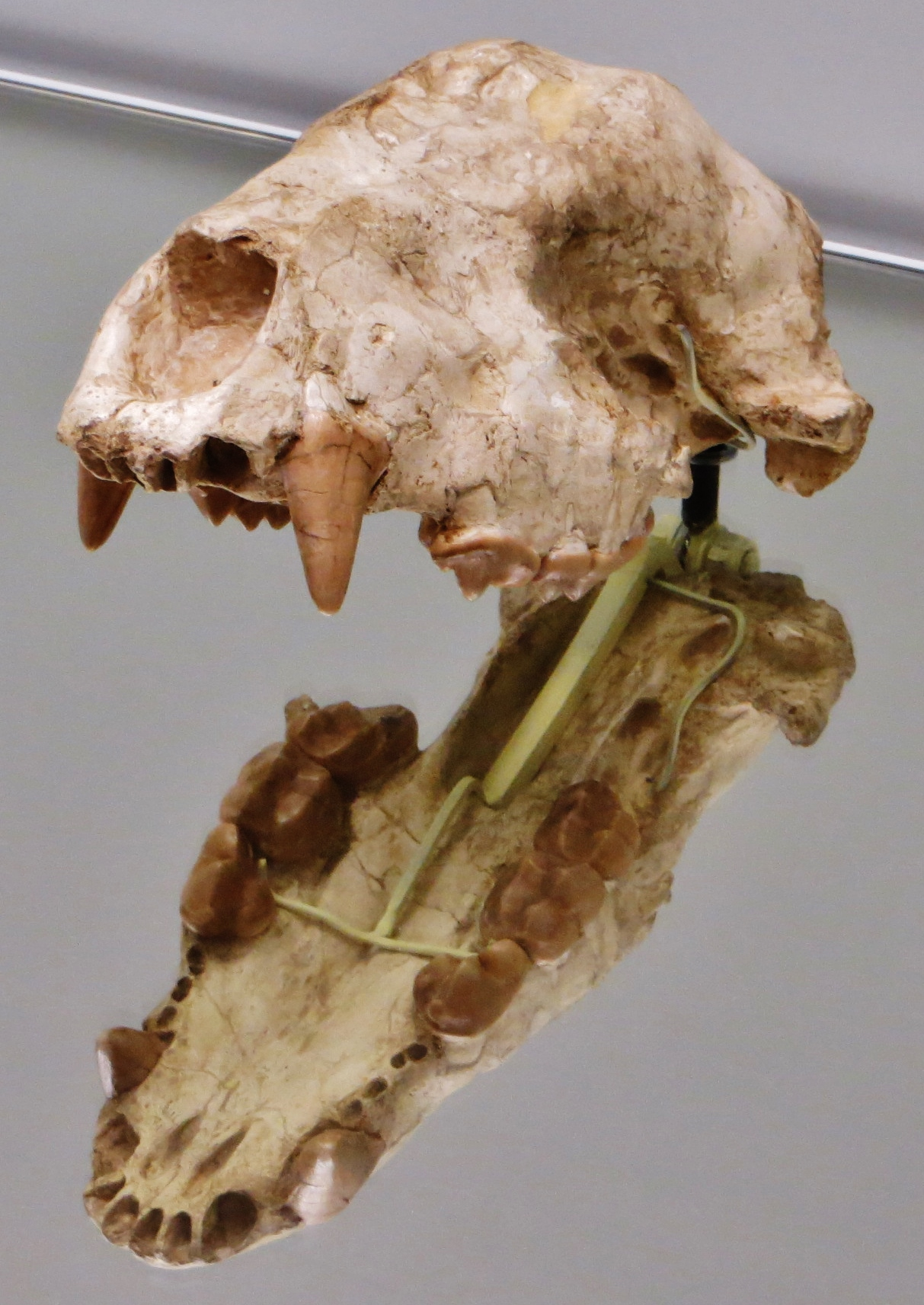
- Fossilized skull of the Miocene bear Indarctos
  †Indarctos – tentative report
- Kinosternon
  - †Kinosternon arizonense – type locality for species
- Lampropeltis
  - †Lampropeltis getulus
- Lasiurus
  - †Lasiurus blossevillii – or unidentified comparable form
- Lemmiscus
  - †Lemmiscus curtatus
- Lepus
- Lynx
- †Machairodus
- †Mammut
- †Mammuthus
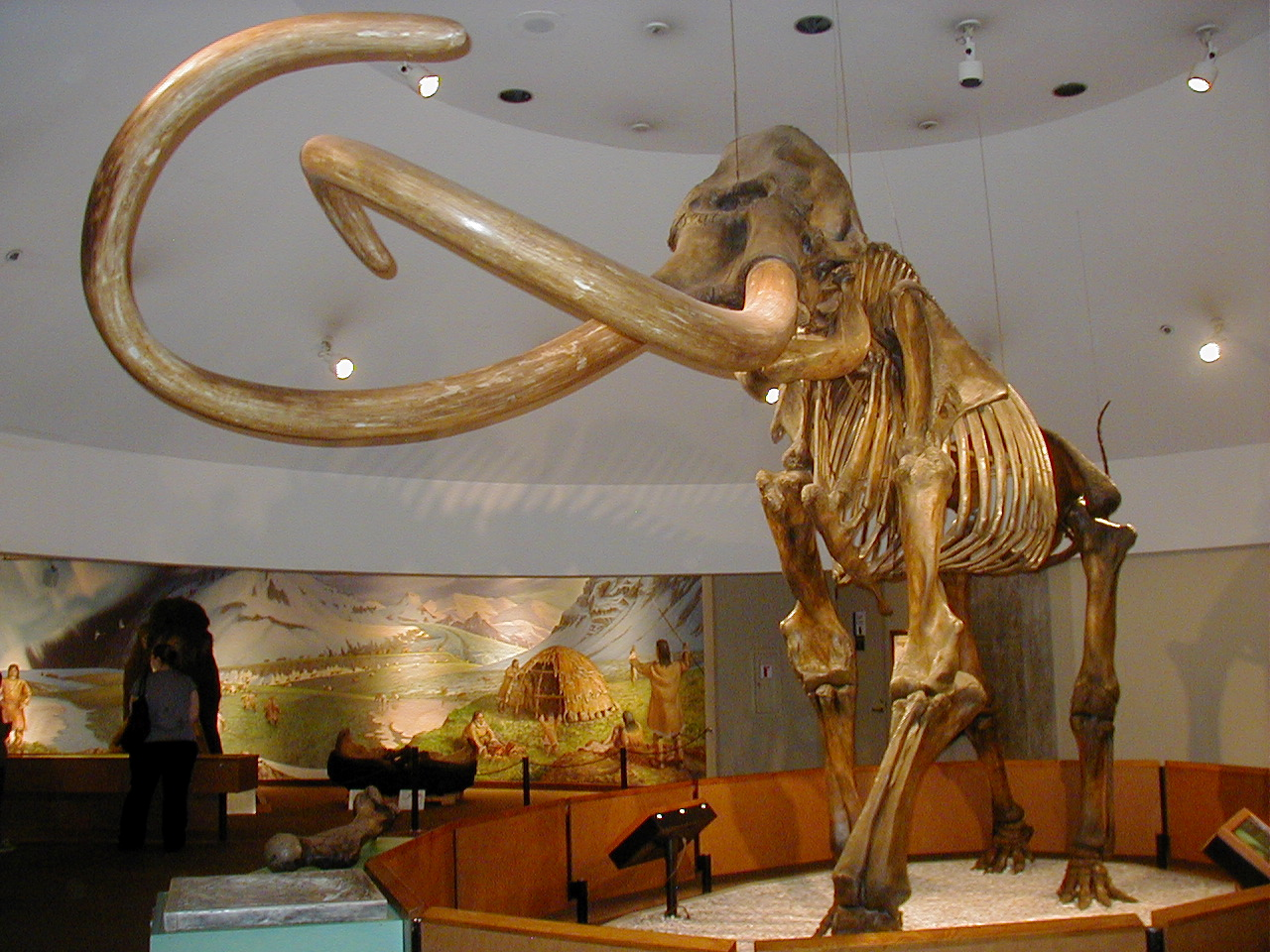
  - Mounted fossilized skeleton of a Mammuthus columbi or Columbian mammoth
    †Mammuthus columbi
- Marmota
- Martes
- †Megalonyx
  - †Megalonyx jeffersonii
- †Megatylopus
- Meleagris
- †Merychyus
- †Metalopex
- Microtus
- †Morrillia
- Mustela
  - †Mustela frenata – or unidentified comparable form
- Myotis
  - †Myotis thysanodes
  - †Myotis velifer
- †Nannippus
- †Neochoerus
- Neotoma
  - †Neotoma albigula – or unidentified comparable form
  - †Neotoma cinerea
  - †Neotoma mexicana – or unidentified comparable form
- Nerodia
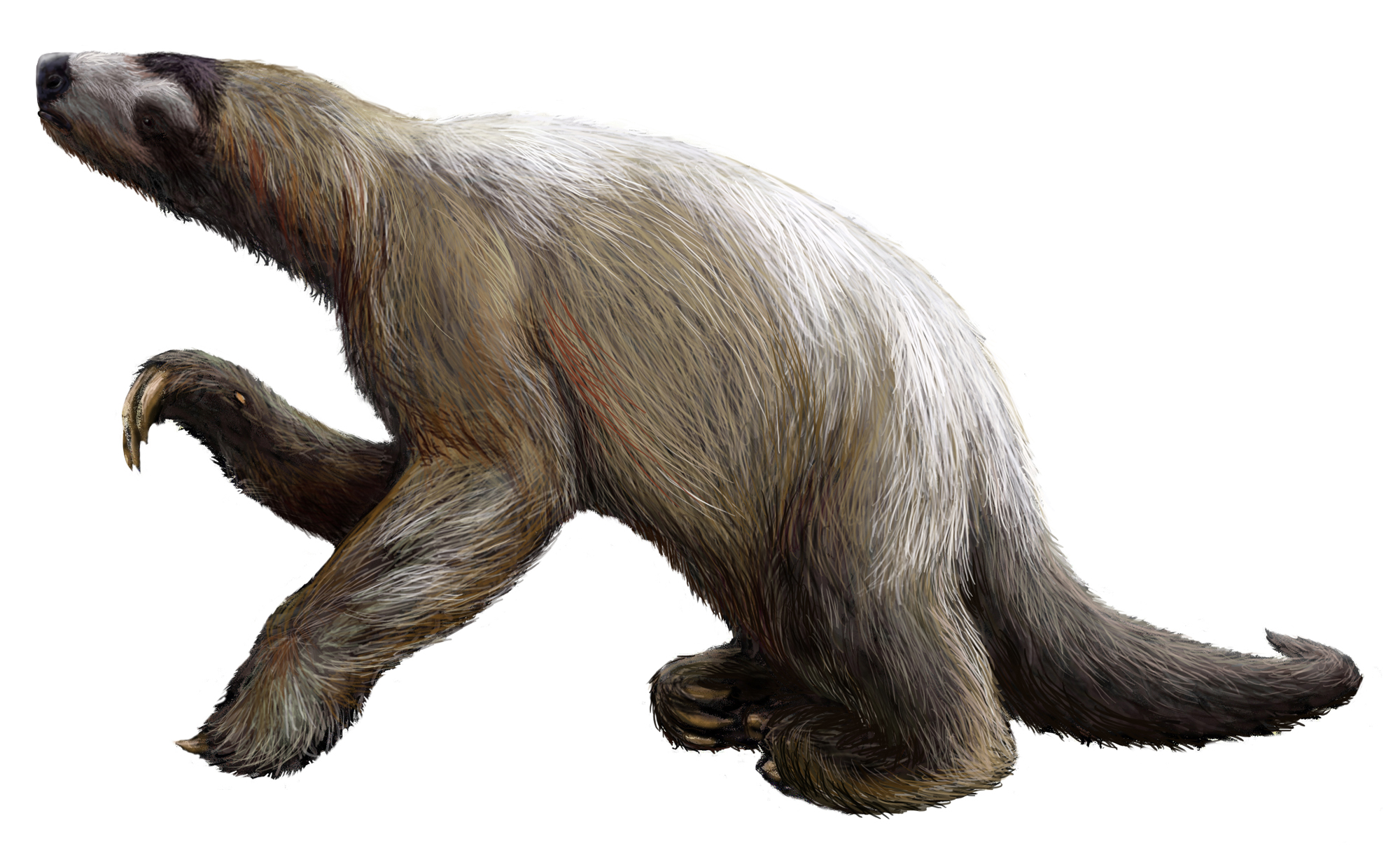
- Life restoration of the Pleistocene ground sloth Nothrotheriops
  †Nothrotheriops
- †Nothrotherium
- Notiosorex
  - †Notiosorex crawfordi
- Odocoileus
- Ondatra
  - †Ondatra zibethicus
- †Onychocampodea – type locality for genus
- †Onychomachilis – type locality for genus
- Onychomys
- Ovis
  - †Ovis canadensis – type locality for species
- Panthera
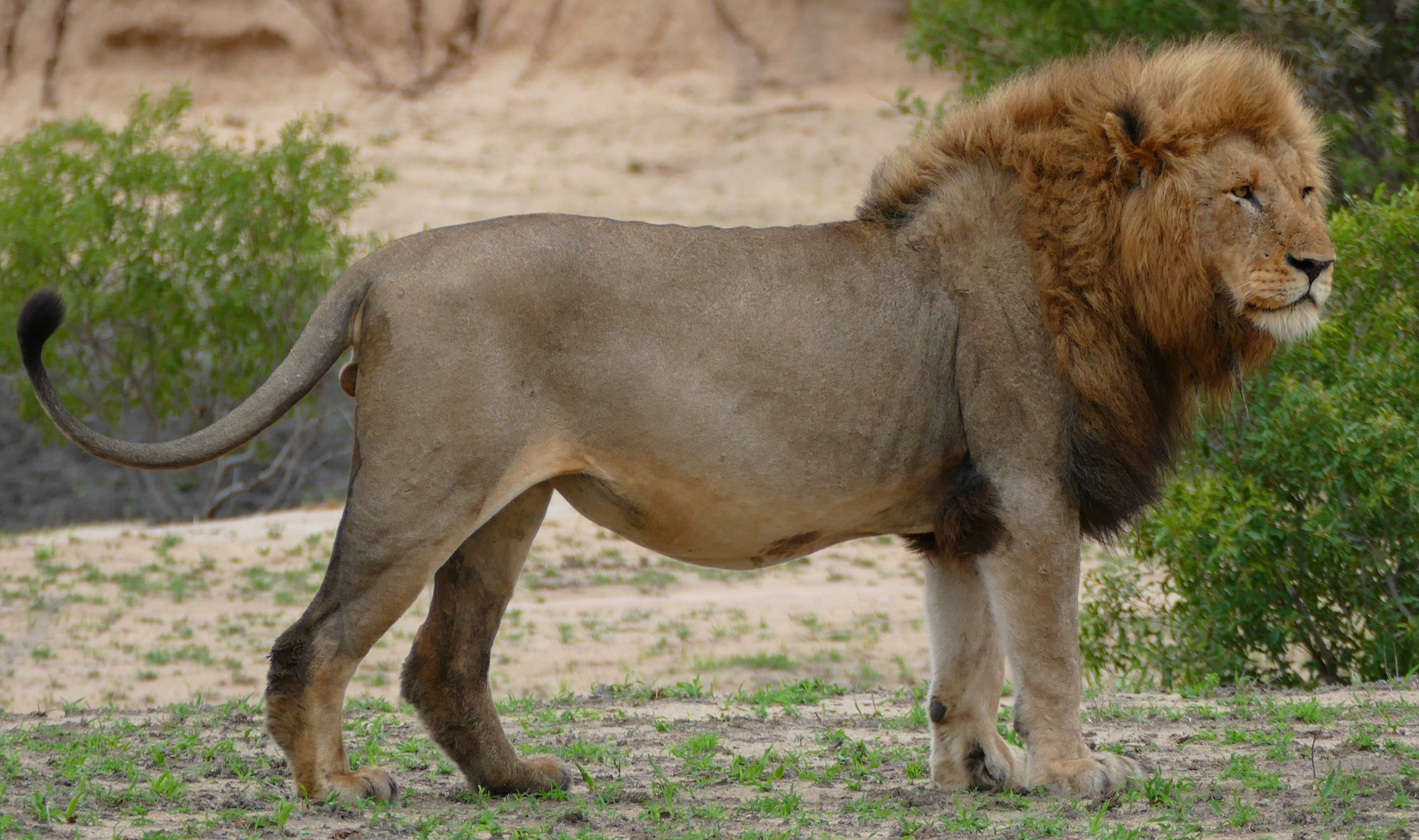
  - A living Panthera leo, or lion
    †Panthera leo
- †Paramachaerodus
- †Paramylodon
  - †Paramylodon harlani
- †Paronychomys
- Perognathus
- Peromyscus
- Pituophis
  - †Pituophis melanoleucus
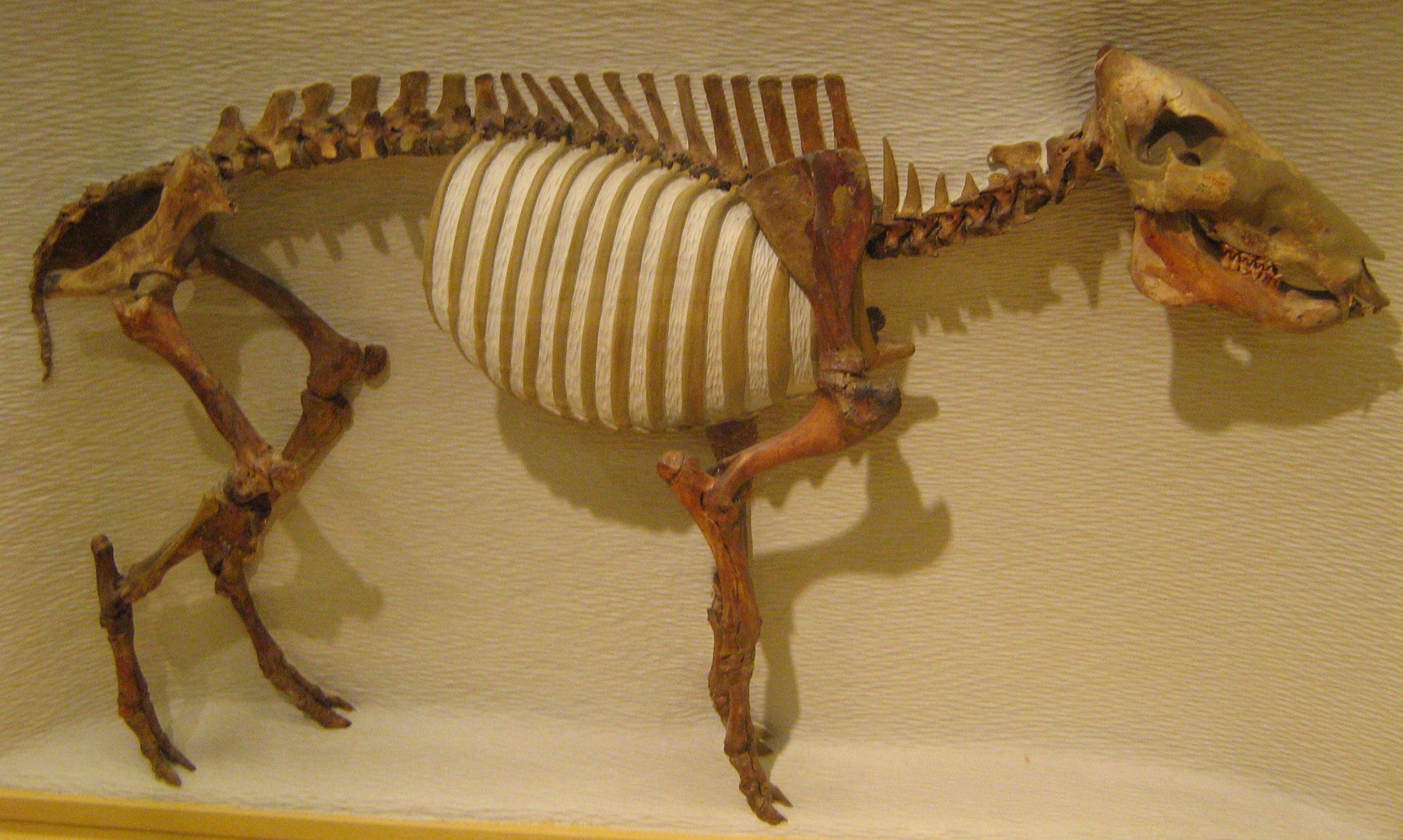
- Mounted fossilized skeleton of the Miocene-Pleistocene peccary Platygonus
  †Platygonus
  - †Platygonus compressus
- †Pleiolama
- †Plesiogulo
- †Plionarctos
- †Protolabis
- †Pseudaelurus – report made of unidentified related form or using admittedly obsolete nomenclature
- Ptinus
- †Rana
- Reithrodontomys
- †Repomys
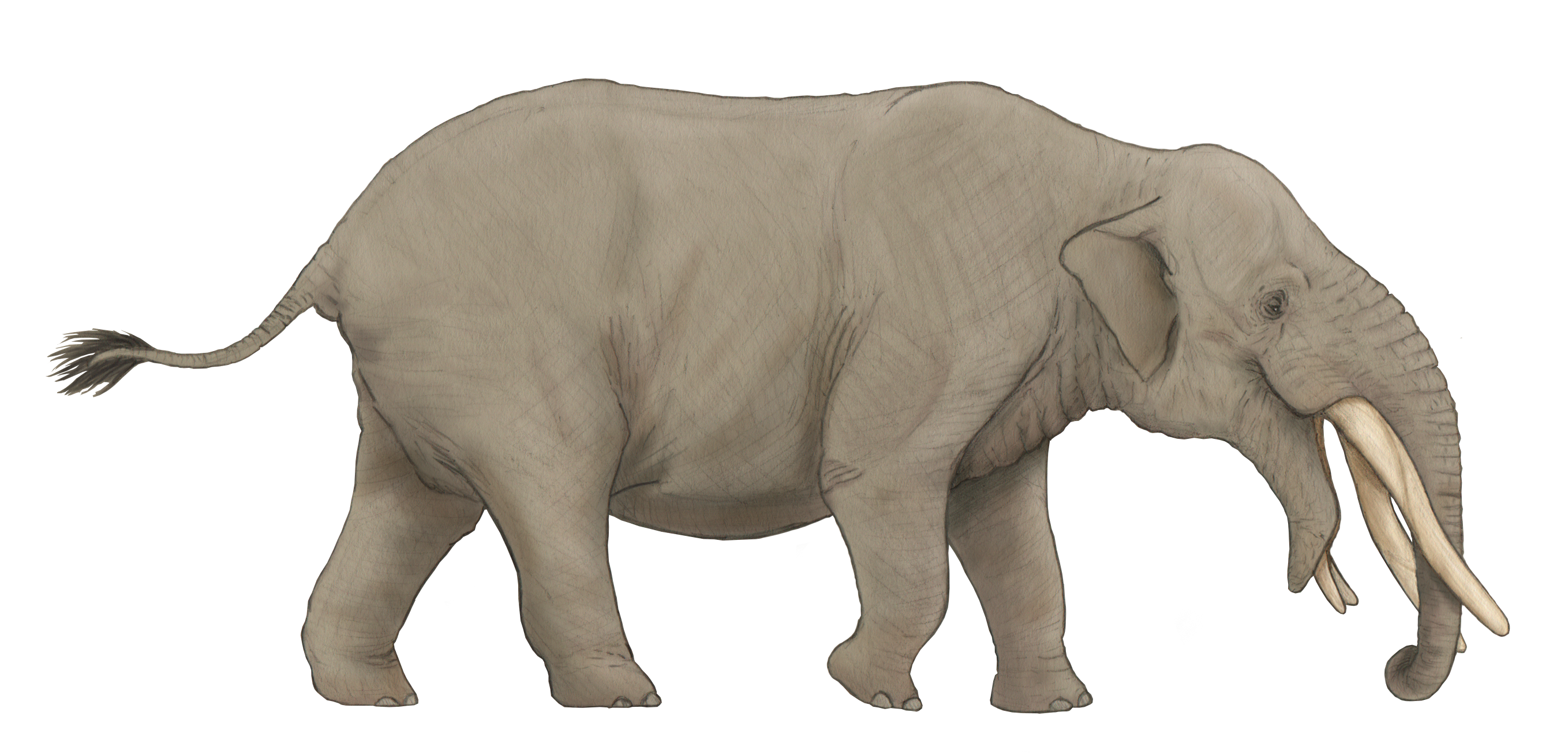
- Restoration of the Miocene-Pliocene elephant relative Rhynchotherium
  †Rhynchotherium
- Scaphiopus
- Sciurus
  - †Sciurus aberti – or unidentified comparable form
- Sigmodon
- Sorex
- Spermophilus
  - †Spermophilus variegatus
- Spilogale
  - †Spilogale putorius
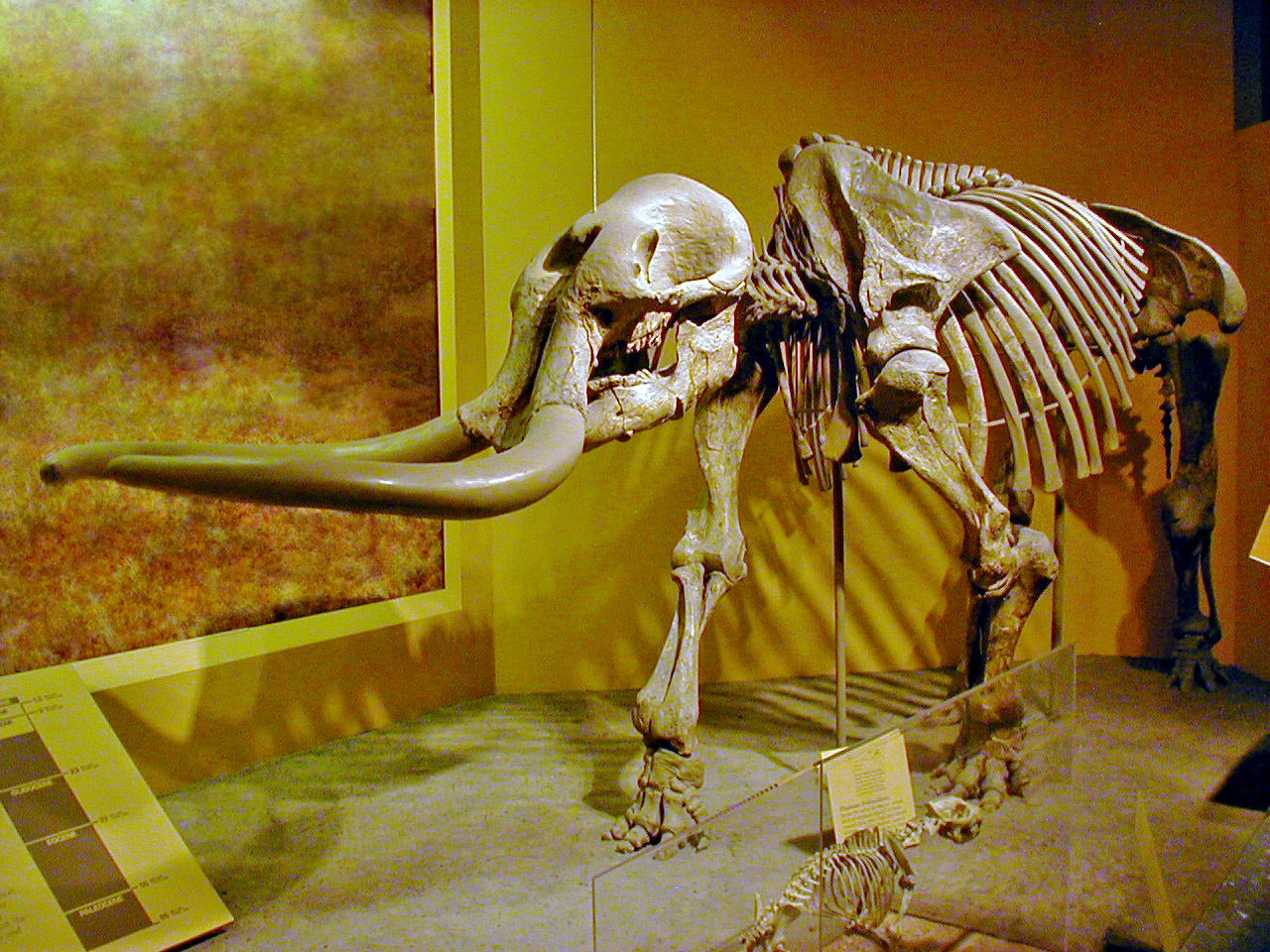
- Mounted fossilized skeleton of the Pliocene-Pleistocene elephant relative Stegomastodon
  †Stegomastodon
  - †Stegomastodon mirificus
- †Stenomylus
- †Stockoceros
- Sylvilagus
  - †Sylvilagus audubonii – or unidentified comparable form
- Tapirus
  - †Tapirus merriami – or unidentified comparable form
- Taxidea
  - †Taxidea taxus
- Tayassu
  - †Tayassu tajacu
- †Teleoceras
- Terrapene
  - †Terrapene ornata – or unidentified comparable form
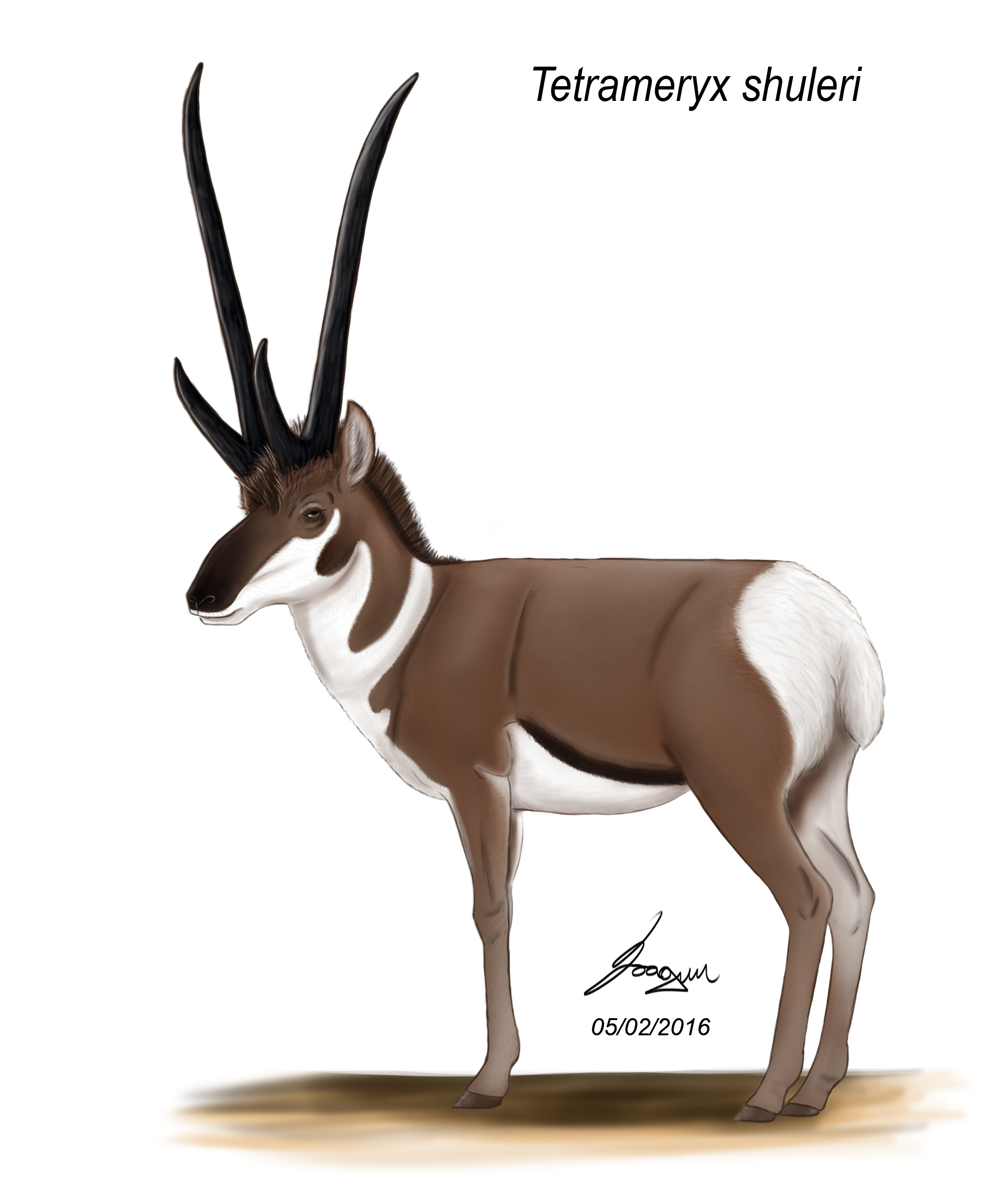
- Restoration of the Pleictocene pronghorn Tetrameryx
  †Tetrameryx – or unidentified comparable form
- Thamnophis
- Thomomys
- †Titanotylopus
  - †Trigonictis macrodon
- Urocyon
- Vulpes
  - †Vulpes velox
