= Yarravia =

Yarravia Temporal range: Pragian–Emsian

Scientific classification
- Kingdom: Plantae
- Clade: Tracheophytes
- Stem group: †Rhyniophytes (?)
- Genus: †Yarravia; W.H.Lang & Cookson (1935)

Species
- Y. oblonga W.H.Lang & Cookson (1935); Y. subsphaerica W.H.Lang & Cookson (1935); Y. minor P. Danzé-Corsin (1956); Y. gorelovii Ananiev (1960)

Extinct genus of vascular plants

Yarravia is a genus of extinct vascular plants mainly known from fossils found in Victoria, Australia. Originally the rocks in which they were found were considered to be late Silurian in age; more recently they have been found to be Early Devonian (Pragian, around 410 million years ago). Specimens consist only of incomplete leafless stems, some of which bore groups of spore-forming organs or sporangia which were fused, at least at the base.

== Source of fossils ==
Fossils of Yarravia were found at a location called the 'Yarra Track', near to the town of Wood's Point, Victoria, Australia. The shale in which they were found, now called the Wilson Creek Shale, was for many years regarded as of late Silurian age. The dating was based on graptolite fossils which were identified as Monograptus uncinatus, which is of early Ludlow age (around 430 to 420 million years ago). These were subsequently described as a new species, M. thomasi, which proved to be of Early Devonian age (Pragian, around 410 million years ago). Rocks of Silurian age do occur in the region and the fossil plant Baragwanathia has been found from both late Silurian and the Early Devonian strata. However, Yarravia was found only in the Devonian shales.

Fossils collected near Rebreuve, Pas-de-Calais Department, northern France, were named Yarravia minor by Danzé-Corsin in 1956. The strata in which they were found were initially considered Pragian, but are now thought to be Emsian (from around 410 to 390 million years ago).

== Description ==
Only the uppermost parts of Yarravia have been found in Australia. The stems (axes) were bare, around 2 to 2.5 mm in diameter. The longest pieces were up to 7.5 cm in length. No examples of branching were seen. The internal structure of the stems is not preserved.

The sporangia were borne in a group at the ends of stems. The specimens are flattened, so that the original shape is not entirely clear, but up to five or six upright elongated sporangia appear to have been radially arranged on a base formed by a widening of the stem; there may have been a central space. At the base the sporangia are fused together, but their tips may be free. The entire structure can be described as a 'synangium'. Blackened material inside the sporangia was assumed to have been spores.

Two species were described from the Australian material. In Y. oblonga, the synangium (the group of fused sporangia) was longer than wide, being about 7 mm long by 1.25 mm wide. The tips of the sporangia were free and appear to consist of tissue not containing spores. The synangium of Y. subsphaerica was significantly larger and as long as wide, being about 1 cm in length and width. The tips of the sporangia were less prominent.

== Taxonomy ==
The genus Yarravia was named in 1935 by Lang and Cookson, based on fossils found in an Australian locality they called the 'Yarra Track'. Two species were named, Y. oblonga and Y. subsphaerica, referring to the shape of the sporangial heads.

== Phylogeny ==
The relationships of Yarravia are uncertain. The genus Hedeia, of similar age, which is known from both Australia and China, had a similar radial cluster of sporangia at the tips of stems; the two genera are distinctive in this way compared to plants from other regions. It has been suggested that Yarravia may simply be Hedeia in a different state of preservation, and that Yarravia is not really synangial. Both genera have been treated as 'rhyniophytes', although other studies regard their placement as uncertain.
