= Hedeia =

Hedeia Temporal range: Early Devonian

Scientific classification
- Kingdom: Plantae
- Division: incertae sedis
- Genus: †Hedeia; Cookson, 1935

Species
- H. corymbosa Cookson, 1935 (type); H. parvula Jurina, 1969; H. sinica Hao, 1998

Extinct genus of land plants

Hedeia is a genus of early land plants of uncertain affinity. It comprises erect axes terminating in corymbose clusters of erect sporangia.

The type species, H. corymbosa, was first described by Isabel Cookson from a few specimens in fine sandstone from near Alexandra, Victoria, Australia. She gave no derivation of the generic name. At the time, the locality was regarded as being of Silurian age, but it is now known to be Early Devonian. It is claimed that an undescribed species, also from Victoria, extends from the Early Devonian back to the Late Silurian.

H. parvula from Kazakhstan and H. sinica from China are also of Early Devonian age.

It is sometimes suggested that Hedeia and Yarravia are merely different preservations of the same type of plant.
