= Ansbachersandstein =

Geological formation in Germany

- Stratigraphic range: Carnian; ~235–222 Ma
- Type: Member
- Unit of: Stuttgart Formation

Lithology
- Primary: Sandstone

Location
- Coordinates: 49.5°N 10.8°E
- Approximate paleocoordinates: 22.1°N 15.7°E
- Region: Northern Bavaria
- Country: Germany

Type section
- Named for: Ansbach
- Ansbachersandstein (Germany) Ansbachersandstein (Bavaria)

The Ansbachersandstein (German for Ansbach Sandstone) is a Late Triassic (Carnian) geologic formation in Germany. Indeterminate fossil ornithischian tracks have been reported from the formation.

== Fossil content ==
- Ichnofossils
  - Apatopus lineatus
  - Atreipus metzneri
  - Chirotherium wondrai

== See also ==
- List of dinosaur-bearing rock formations
  - List of stratigraphic units with ornithischian tracks
    - Indeterminate ornithischian tracks
- Benkersandstein, contemporaneous ichnofossiliferous formation of Bavaria
- Chañares Formation, fossiliferous formation of the Ischigualasto-Villa Unión Basin, Argentina
- Candelária Formation, contemporaneous fossiliferous formation of the Paraná Basin, Brazil
- Molteno Formation, contemporaneous fossiliferous formation of Lesotho and South Africa
- Pebbly Arkose Formation, contemporaneous fossiliferous formation of Botswana, Zambia and Zimbabwe
- Denmark Hill Insect Bed, contemporaneous fossiliferous unit of Queensland, Australia
- Madygen Formation, contemporaneous Lagerstätte of Kyrgyzstan
