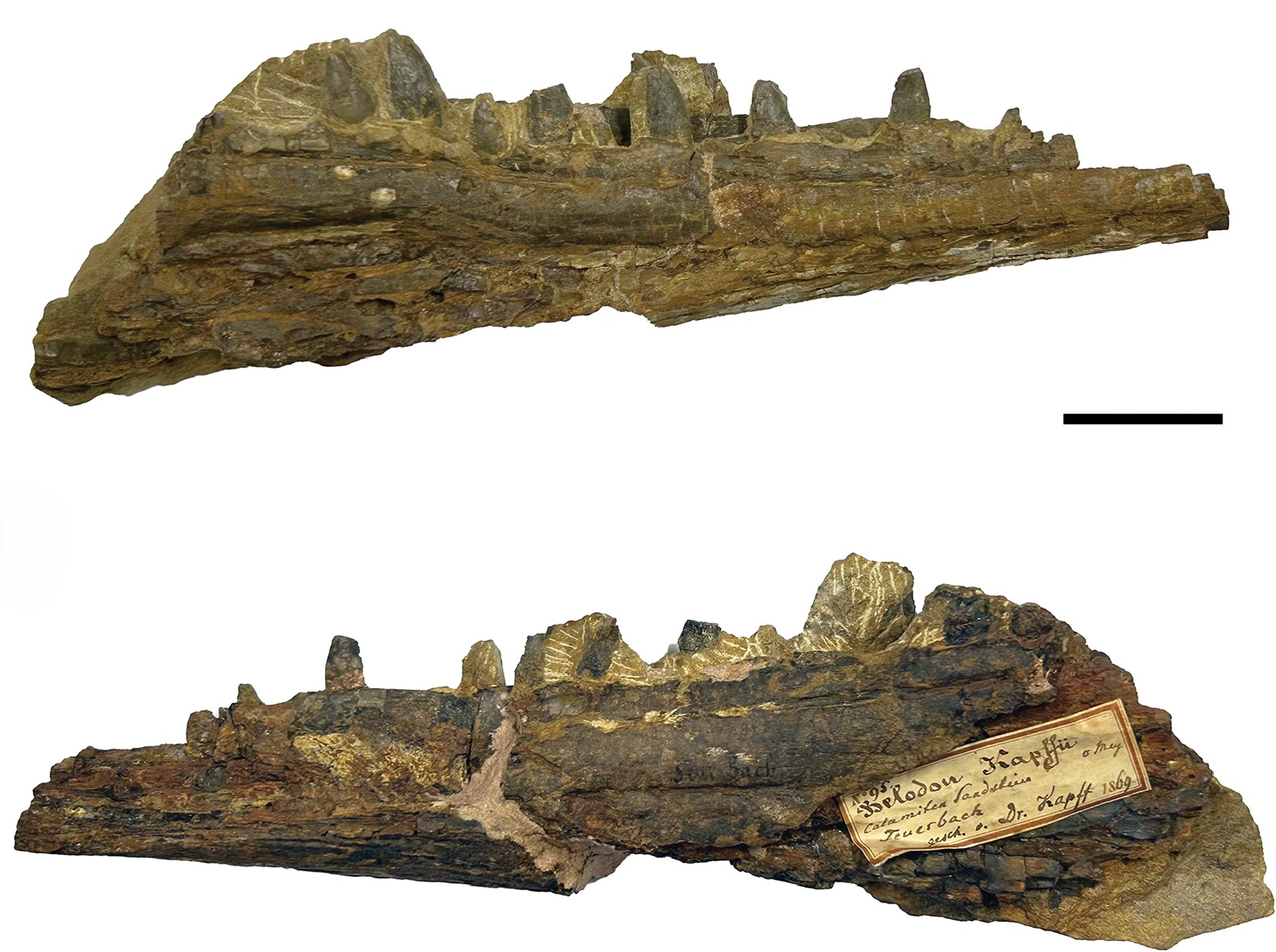
- Holotype specimen, labeled as Belodon (=Nicrosaurus) kapffi

Scientific classification
- Kingdom: Animalia
- Phylum: Chordata
- Class: Reptilia
- Clade: Crurotarsi
- Order: †Phytosauria
- Clade: †incertae sedis
- Genus: †Calamosuchus; Sues & Schoch, 2025
- Species: †C. arenaceus

Binomial name
- †Calamosuchus arenaceus (Fraas, 1896)

Synonyms
- Zanclodon arenaceus Fraas, 1896; Belodon arenaceus (Fraas, 1896) Huene, 1902; Phytosaurus arenaceus (Fraas, 1896) Schmidt, 1928; Mystriosuchus arenaceus (Fraas, 1896) Kühn, 1933

= Calamosuchus =

Calamosuchus Temporal range: Late Triassic, Carnian (Tuvalian substage)

Genus of phytosaur reptiles

Calamosuchus is an extinct genus of probable early phytosaurian reptiles known from the Late Triassic (Carnian age) Stuttgart Formation of Germany. The genus contains a single species, Calamosuchus arenaceus, known from a partial mandible. The species was first described in 1896 by Eberhard Fraas, who assigned it to the genus Zanclodon as Z. arenaceus. Although researchers have noticed substantial differences between Z. arenaceus and the Z. laevis (the type species) since 1902, it did not receive a distinct genus name until 2025, when it was placed in the new genus Calamosuchus.

== Discovery and naming ==
In 1869, the State Museum of Natural History Stuttgart (SMNS) obtained a partial mandible collected by Sixt Friedrich Jakob von Kapff, at which point it was identified as a specimen of Belodon (now Nicrosaurus) kapffi. The specimen was discovered in the Schilfsandstein ('reed sandstone') deposits in Feuerbacher Heide, representing outcrops of the Stuttgart Formation near Feuerbach, Stuttgart, in Germany. The specimen is permanently accessioned at this museum as specimen SMNS 80737.

In 1896, German paleontologist Eberhard Fraas provided the first brief description of SMNS 80737, naming it as the holotype of a new species of the genus Zanclodon, Z. arenaceus, at that time thought—according to Fraas—to be a dinosaur without any doubt. The specific name, arenaceus, is a Latin word referring to sandy places, alluding to the discovery of the specimen in the Schilfsandstein locality, literally translating to 'reed sandstone'.

In subsequent years, publications by researchers including Friedrich von Huene in 1902 and Frank Westphal in 1963 regarded the specimen as belonging to a member of the Phytosauria—a group of convergently crocodilian-like archosauriforms—instead of a dinosaur. Von Huene provided the first published figure of SMNS 80737, criticizing Fraas' identification of the specimen. Although he provided no anatomical evidence for his conclusions, he assigned the species to the phytosaur genus Belodon. Later researchers accepted a phtyosaur placement for the species, not part of the genus Zanclodon, proposing affinities with the genera Phytosaurus and Mystriosuchus as well. The first detailed description of SMNS 80737 was provided by Axel Hungerbühler in 2001, who confirmed the specimen is significantly distinct from Z. laevis, the type species of Zanclodon, and concluded it should not be treated as a member of this genus. Hungerbühler further noted phytosaur-like characters in the specimen, but also the lack of important phytosaur autapomorphies (unique derived traits). As such, "Z." arenaceus was treated as Archosauria incertae sedis. Hungerbühler refrained from naming a new genus for the material due to its fragmentary nature.

In 2025, Hans-Dieter Sues and Rainer R. Schoch published an extensive review of Triassic reptiles from Germany. Herein, they proposed a new genus name for "Z." arenaceus, forming the new combination Calamosuchus arenaceus. The new generic name, Calamosuchus, combines calamus, a Latin word meaning 'reed', with the Greek word soûkhos (suchus), derived from the Greek name of Sobek, the crocodile-headed deity of Ancient Egyptian myth. Like the specific name, this references the Schilfsandstein locality where the holotype was found, while '-suchus' is a suffix often used in reptile generic names.

== Description and classification ==
The preserved mandible of Calamosuchus measures about 23 centimetres (9.1 in) long, including at least the dentaries and splenials. The symphysis (region where the two hemimandibles fuse at the midline) is 11.5 cm (4.5 in) long. The morphology of the fragmentary specimen indicates the mandible would have been greatly elongate in life. All of the visible teeth are incomplete; the right side has 15 alveoli (tooth positions) and nine preserved teeth. The teeth bear serrations, contrary to the condition in Zanclodon laevis, which lacks them.

In the 2001 redescription of SMNS 80737, a phylogenetic analysis was performed, recovering the specimen as the sister taxon to Phytosauria. However, Hungerbühler noted that, while this is the most parsimonious (best supported by the available data) position in the analysis, many characters separate it from phytosaurs and all other Triassic archosaurs studied at that time. The only characters he observed uniting "Z." arenaceus with phytosaurs is the elongated mandible and mandibular symphysis, while it is different in all other features. Differences include the shape and proportional height of the mandible, the anterior (toward the tip of the snout) extent of the splenial, the tooth structure, and the absence of heterodonty (multiple tooth morphologies). As such, the species could not be assigned to the Phytosauria based on its definition at the time, and Hungerbühler refrained from redefining the clade to include "Z." arenaceus. Instead, he treated it more broadly as a member of the Archosauria with uncertain placement (incertae sedis).

In their 2025 publication naming the new genus Calamosuchus for "Z." arenaceus, Sues and Schoch instead described it as Phytosauria incertae sedis, suggesting it represents an early-diverging member of this clade.

== Palaeoenvironment ==
Calamosuchus is known from the Stuttgart Formation, which dates to the Carnian age of the Late Triassic. Other reptiles known from this formation include Henodus chelyops (a turtle-like placodontian sauropterygian), Thuringopelta werneburgi (a doswelliid proterochampsian), and Dyoplax arenaceus (an erpetosuchid pseudosuchian).
