= Compsosaurus =

Compsosaurus Temporal range: Late Triassic, 205.6–201.6 Ma

Scientific classification
- Domain: Eukaryota
- Kingdom: Animalia
- Phylum: Chordata
- Class: Reptilia
- Clade: Archosauromorpha
- Clade: Archosauriformes
- Order: †Phytosauria
- Family: †Parasuchidae
- Genus: †Compsosaurus; Leidy, 1856

Type species
- †Compsosaurus priscus Leidy, 1856

Synonyms
- Belodon priscus? Leidy, 1856

Extinct genus of reptiles

Compsosaurus (meaning "elegant lizard") is an extinct genus of phytosaur, a crocodile-like reptile that lived during the Triassic. Its fossils have been found in North Carolina. The type species, Compsosaurus priscus, was named by American paleontologist Joseph Leidy in 1856, although other sources say 1857. Compsosaurus may have been the same animal as the related Belodon.

Only four teeth are known, discovered in the Carnian-Rhaetian-aged coal fields of Chatham County, North Carolina (probably Red Sandstone Formation) and the New Oxford Formation of Pennsylvania.
