= Centemodon =

Centemodon Temporal range: Late Triassic, 221–218 Ma

Scientific classification
- Domain: Eukaryota
- Kingdom: Animalia
- Phylum: Chordata
- Class: Reptilia
- Clade: Archosauromorpha
- Clade: Archosauriformes
- Order: †Phytosauria
- Genus: †Centemodon; Lea, 1856

Type species
- †Centemodon sulcatus Lea, 1856

Synonyms
- Paleorhinus sulcatus (Lea, 1856); Rutiodon sulcatus (Lea, 1856)

Extinct genus of reptiles

Centemodon (meaning "point tooth") is an extinct genus of basal phytosaur from the Late Triassic Period. It lived in what is now Pennsylvania, United States. It is classified as a nomen dubium. It was found in the Red Sandstone Formation near the Schuyklill River. Centemodon may have been related to Suchoprion. It was a small phytosaur, weighing no more than 200 kilograms (440 lb) when fully grown.

== Discovery and naming ==
Sometime before the Bone Wars, a palaeontologist known as Dr. Leo (surname unknown) discovered several fossil fragmentary teeth that later became the Centemodon holotype. When Leo described the fragments, he was unsure of what they belonged to, and Leo did not name the fragments. They were eventually named in 1856 by Isaac Lea.
