= Stuttgart Formation =

Geologic formation in Germany

- Stratigraphic range: Carnian; ~235–222 Ma
- Type: Formation
- Unit of: Keuper
- Sub-units: Ansbachersandstein & Schilfsandstein members
- Underlies: Weser & Steigerwald Formations
- Overlies: Grabfeld & Benk Formations

Lithology
- Primary: Sandstone
- Other: Claystone

Location
- Coordinates: 49.2°N 9.3°E
- Approximate paleocoordinates: 21.4°N 14.9°E
- Region: Baden-Württemberg, Bavaria, North Rhine-Westphalia
- Country: Germany, Switzerland

Type section
- Named for: Stuttgart
- Stuttgart Formation (Germany)

The Stuttgart Formation is a geologic formation in Germany. It preserves fossils dating back to the Carnian stage of the Triassic period.

== Fossil content ==
=== Temnospondyls ===
- Cyclotosaurus buechneri
- C. robustus
- Hyperokynodon keuperinus
- Mastodonsaurus andriani
- Metoposaurus diagnosticus
- Gerrothorax sp.

=== Therapsids ===
- Kannemeyeriiformes indet.(Possibly Woznikella triradiata)

=== Reptiles ===
- Calamosuchus arenaceus
- Dyoplax arenaceus
- Thuringopelta werneburgi
- Zanclodon subcylindrodon
- Archosauria indet.

=== Fish ===
- Lissodus sp.
- Palaeobates sp.

Invertebrates

- Aviculomyalina angusta
- Cyzicus laxitextus
- C. cf. dorsorectus
- C. minutus
- Homomya bilonga
- H. simplex
- Myalina rotundata
- Mytilus acutefinitus
- M. avirostrum
- M. hasta
- M. minutus
- M. peregrinus
- M. sulmensis
- Lithophaga buchhornensis
- L. lennachensis
- L. producta
- L. vermiculata
- Mactromya altera
- M. equisetitis
- Modiolus eberstadtensis
- M. formosissimus
- M. mediocarinatus
- M. minalatus
- M. parallelus
- M. parvoblongus
- M. suprarectus
- M. transiens
- M. triangulus
- Myoconcha aperina
- M. longaperina
- M. ovulum
- M. scalprosa
- M. cf. woehrmanni
- M. aff. aquatensis
- Parallelodon beyrichii
- Pinna mediokeuperina
- Pleuromya curta
- P. nitens
- Schafhaeutlia aff. liscaviensis
- Thracia keuperina
- Trigonodus cf. grandis
- T. pygmaeus
- T. singularis
- T. wuertembergicus
- Asmussia sp.
- Gervillia sp.
- ?Gryphaea sp.
- Myoconcha sp.
- Mytilus sp.
- Trigonodus sp.

=== Flora ===
- Clathrophyllum meriani
- Danaeopsis marantacea
- D. rumphi
- Desmiophyllum imhoffi
- Dioonitocarpidium pennaeforme
- Neocalamites meriani
- Pagiophyllum foetterlei
- Voltziopsis coburgensis
- Widdringtonites keuperianus
- Equisetites sp.
- Pterophyllum sp.

== See also ==
- List of fossiliferous stratigraphic units in Germany
- List of fossiliferous stratigraphic units in Switzerland
- Benkersandstein, contemporaneous ichnofossiliferous formation of Bavaria
- Chañares Formation, fossiliferous formation of the Ischigualasto-Villa Unión Basin, Argentina
- Candelária Formation, contemporaneous fossiliferous formation of the Paraná Basin, Brazil
- Molteno Formation, contemporaneous fossiliferous formation of Lesotho and South Africa
- Pebbly Arkose Formation, contemporaneous fossiliferous formation of Botswana, Zambia and Zimbabwe
- Denmark Hill Insect Bed, contemporaneous fossiliferous unit of Queensland, Australia
- Madygen Formation, contemporaneous Lagerstätte of Kyrgyzstan
