= Kenneth Baird =

Kenneth Baird may refer to:

- Kenneth M. Baird (1923–2022), Canadian physicist, metrologist and inventor
- Ken Baird (1951–2016), ice hockey player
