= Hassberge Formation =

Geologic formation in Bavaria, Germany

- Stratigraphic range: Carnian (Tuvalian); ~235–222 Ma
- Type: Formation
- Unit of: Keuper
- Sub-units: Blasensandstein & Coburger Sandstein members
- Underlies: Mainhardt Formation
- Overlies: Steigerwald Formation

Lithology
- Primary: Sandstone
- Other: Shale

Location
- Coordinates: 50.0°N 10.7°E
- Approximate paleocoordinates: 27.4°N 13.1°E
- Region: Bavaria
- Country: Germany
- Extent: Southern Germanic Basin

Type section
- Named for: Hassberge
- Hassberge Formation (Germany)

The Hassberge Formation is a geologic formation in Bavaria, Germany. It preserves fossils dating back to the Carnian stage of the Triassic period.

== Fossil content ==
=== Insects ===
Coleoptera

- Carabilarva triassica
- Dinoharpalus coptoclavoides
- Larvula triassica
- Protonectes germanicus
- Stargelytron larissae
- Zygadenia sp.
- Coptoclavidae indet.

=== Invertebrates ===
- Euestheria kozuri
- Gregoriusella striatula
- Laxitextella dorsorecta
- L. freybergi

=== Ichnofossils ===
- Apatopus lineatus

== See also ==
- List of fossiliferous stratigraphic units in Germany
- Benkersandstein, contemporaneous ichnofossiliferous formation of Bavaria
- Chañares Formation, fossiliferous formation of the Ischigualasto-Villa Unión Basin, Argentina
- Candelária Formation, contemporaneous fossiliferous formation of the Paraná Basin, Brazil
- Molteno Formation, contemporaneous fossiliferous formation of Lesotho and South Africa
- Pebbly Arkose Formation, contemporaneous fossiliferous formation of Botswana, Zambia and Zimbabwe
- Denmark Hill Insect Bed, contemporaneous fossiliferous unit of Queensland, Australia
- Madygen Formation, contemporaneous Lagerstätte of Kyrgyzstan
