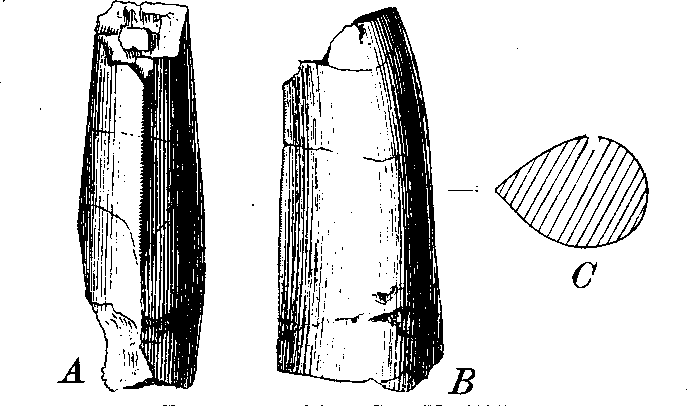
- Holotype tooth (AMNH 2331) of C. veatleianus seen from two different angles

Scientific classification
- Kingdom: Animalia
- Phylum: Chordata
- Class: Reptilia
- Clade: Archosauromorpha
- Clade: Archosauriformes
- Clade: Archosauria
- Genus: †Clepsysaurus; Lea, 1851

Type species
- †Clepsysaurus pennsylvanicus Lea, 1851

Other species
- †C. veatleianus Cope, 1877

Synonyms
- Belodon priscus? Cope non Leidy, 1856; Clepsisaurus Emmons, 1856 (sic); Clepysaurus Kuhn, 1933 (sic); Rutiodon pennsylvanicus Lea, 1851

= Clepsysaurus =

Clepsysaurus Temporal range: Late Triassic, 219–201.7 Ma

Genus of extinct archosaur

Clepsysaurus (from Greek: κλεψύδρα klepsúdra, 'water thief' and Greek: σαῦρος saûros, 'lizard') is a dubious genus of extinct archosaur from the Carnian Passaic Formation and Lockatong Formation of Lehigh County, and York County, Pennsylvania.

Two species are known: C. pennsylvanicus (the type species) and C. veatleianus.

== Discovery and naming ==
=== Clepsysaurus pennsylvanicus ===
The holotype of C. pennsylvanicus, ANSP 9526, 9555-71, 9594-5, consists of teeth, ribs and vertebrae from the Passaic Formation of Pennsylvania. It was described by Isaac Lea in 1851.

Other specimens of C. pennsylvanicus are known, including ANSP 15071 (a left anterior dentary with 23 teeth, a right dentary with 30 teeth and a portion of the right temporal region), AMNH 2337 (a single tooth) and ANSP 15529 (18 large blocks of matrix containing bone material, comprising postcranial and rib fragments alongside 12 small bone fragments comprising vertebral and rib fragments, one isolated vertebral centrum, broken in half laterally and glued together, and 40 small bone fragments, some of them being rib fragments).

A left anterior dentary and right dentary, from the Lockatong Formation, found on the farm of George Huber was identified by Colbert (1943) as belonging to C. pennsylvanicus.

=== Clepsysaurus veatleianus ===
The holotype of C. veatleianus, AMNH 2331, consists of a single broken tooth, with AMNH 2330, a tooth, as a referred specimen—these were found in the Phoenixville tunnel in York County, Pennsylvania. C. veatleianus was described by Edward Drinker Cope in 1876.

== Classification ==
Clepsysaurus was traditionally classed as a sauropodomorph, but more recent studies indicate that it was either a dubious basal archosaur or a member of the Phytosauria. Clepsysaurus was eventually seen as a synonym of either the dubious archosaur Palaeosaurus or the sauropodomorph Anchisaurus, but Clepsysaurus was eventually resurrected as a valid, but dubious, genus.

== Gallery ==
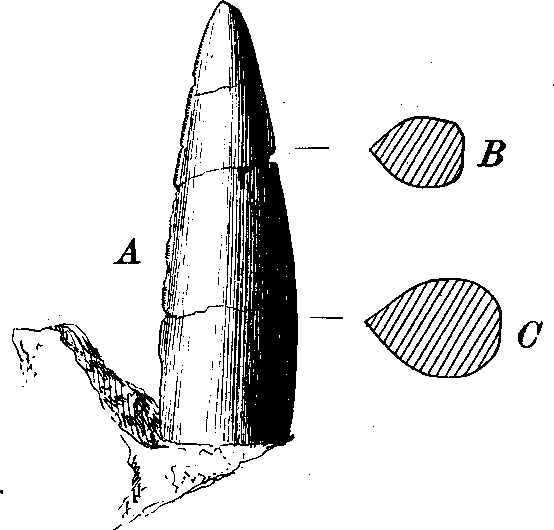
AMNH 2330, a tooth referred to C. veatleianus

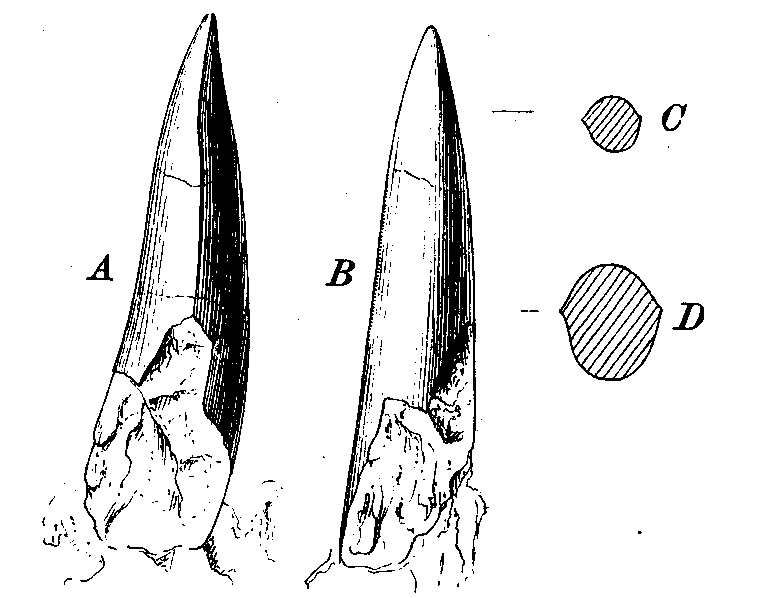
C. pennsylvanicus tooth AMNH 3227 seen from two different angles
