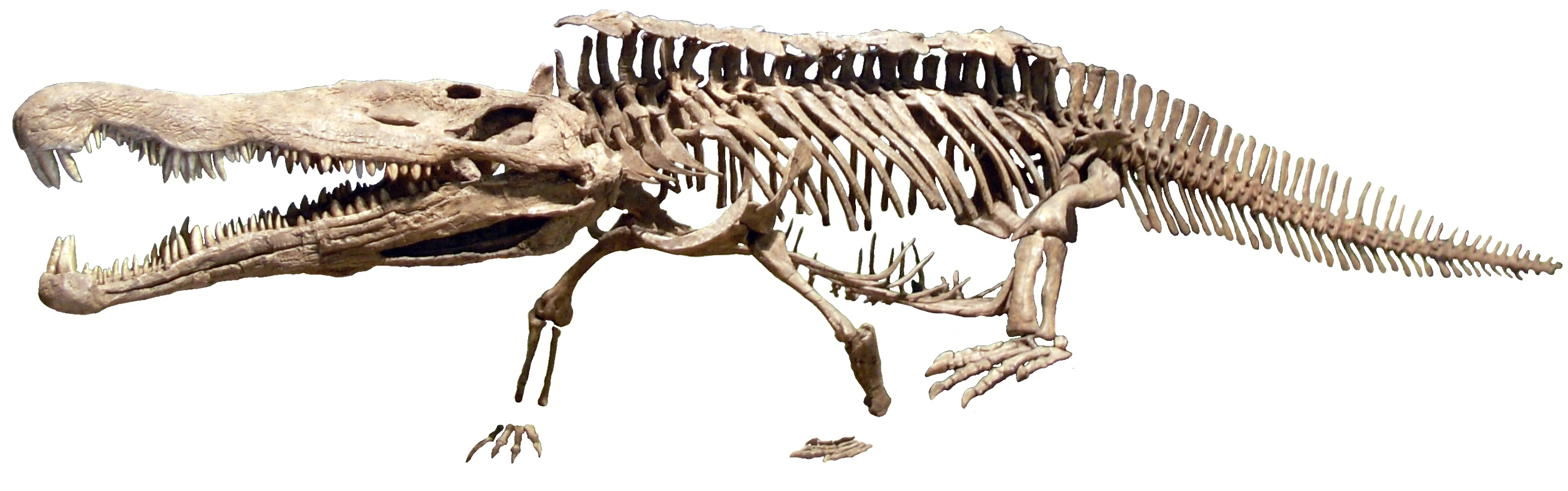
- Skeleton of Redondasaurus at the Carnegie Museum of Natural History

Scientific classification
- Kingdom: Animalia
- Phylum: Chordata
- Class: Reptilia
- Clade: Eucrocopoda
- Clade: Crurotarsi
- Order: †Phytosauria von Meyer, 1861

Subgroups
- †Centemodon?
- †Clepsysaurus?
- †Diandongosuchus
- †Mesorhinosuchus
- †Omosaurus?
- †Parasuchidae
Phytosauria incertae sedis
- †Belodon
- †Calamosuchus
- †Compsosaurus
- †Francosuchus?
- †Parrishia?
- †Phytosaurus
- †Termatosaurus?

Synonyms
- Parasuchia Huxley, 1875

= Phytosauria =

Phytosaurs Temporal range: Ladinian – Rhaetian, 242–201.4 Ma Possible ghost lineage from the Middle Triassic Possible Early Jurassic (Hettangian) records

Order of reptiles

Phytosaurs (Φυτόσαυροι in Greek, meaning 'plant lizard') are an extinct group of large, mostly semiaquatic Late Triassic archosauriform or basal archosaurian reptiles. Phytosaurs belong to the order Phytosauria and are sometimes referred to as parasuchians. Phytosauria, Parasuchia, Parasuchidae, and Phytosauridae have often been considered equivalent groupings containing the same species. Some recent studies have offered a more nuanced approach, defining Parasuchidae and Phytosauridae as nested clades within Phytosauria as a whole. The clade Phytosauria was defined by Paul Sereno in 2005 as Rutiodon carolinensis and all taxa more closely related to it than to Aetosaurus ferratus, Rauisuchus tiradentes, Prestosuchus chiniquensis, Ornithosuchus woodwardi, or Crocodylus niloticus (the Nile crocodile). Phytosaurs were long-snouted and heavily armoured, bearing a remarkable resemblance to modern crocodilians in size, appearance, and lifestyle, as an example of convergence or parallel evolution.

The name phytosaur means 'plant lizard', as the first fossils of phytosaurs were mistakenly thought to belong to plant-eaters.

For many years, phytosaurs were considered to be the most basal group of Pseudosuchia (crocodile-line archosaurs), meaning that they were thought to be more closely related to the crocodilians than to birds (the other living group of archosaurs). Some studies of the evolutionary relationships of early archosauriforms have suggested that phytosaurs evolved before the split between crocodile- and bird-line archosaurs and are a sister taxon of Archosauria. The most recent study retains the former way of classifying phytosaurs as pseudosuchians.

Phytosaurs had a nearly global distribution during the Triassic. Fossils have been recovered from Europe, North America, India, Morocco, Thailand, Brazil, Greenland and Madagascar. Fossils attributed to phytosaurs have been found in Early Jurassic rocks, possibly extending their temporal range beyond the Triassic-Jurassic boundary. They may have also been present in rock layers dating to the Middle Triassic of China as evidenced by Diandongosuchus, however it is not known if this is truly a member of the clade.

== Description ==
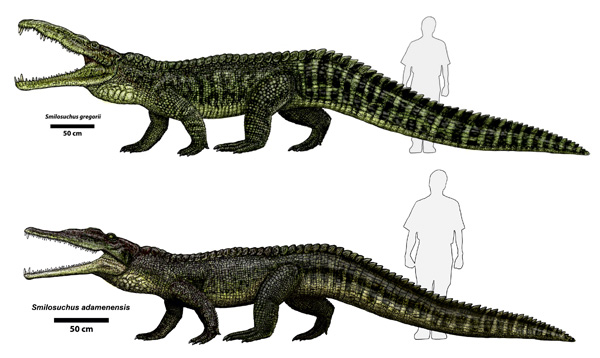
Illustration of two Smilosuchus species, illustrating brachyrostral and dolichorostral snout types

Phytosaurs are known from many different morphologies, specifically with vastly different skull forms. These changes relate to the feeding and habits of the animals, not completely evolutionary modifications. Dolichorostral ('long-snouted') phytosaurs have a long, slender snout with many conical teeth that are homodont (all the same). These taxa were most likely piscivores that were well adapted to capture fast aquatic prey, but not terrestrial animals. Paleorhinus, Rutiodon and Mystriosuchus are dolichorostral phytosaurs, but do not form a distinct group of taxa (named Mystriosuchinae of Friedrich von Huene) as other morphotypes such as Pseudopalatus are more closely related to Mystriosuchus than it is to the other long-snouted taxa. Brachyrostral ('short-snouted') forms are the opposite, having a massive, broad snout, and very strong skulls and jaws. They are heterodont, as the front teeth are prominent fangs, and the rear teeth are blade-like for slicing food into chunks that can be swallowed easily. Taxa like this, such as Nicrosaurus and Smilosuchus, were powerful taxa that fed on stronger prey, such as terrestrial animals that came to the water to drink. Altirostral ('high-snouted') animals are intermediate between the two distinct types. They had heterodont dentition but not as extremely developed as the brachyrostral type. Pseudopalatus is an altirostral phytosaur, and was most likely a generalist feeder. Modern crocodilians exhibit a similar morphological diversity, for example the broad snouted altirostral alligator and the long snouted dolichorostral gavial.

Various phytosaurs have crests and similar ornamentations in their snouts. Nicrosaurus has a ridge along the snout that would have supported a keratinous crest in life, while Mystriosuchus westphali has several bony crests.

=== Differences from crocodiles ===
Despite their great similarities in appearance and lifestyle, there are still a number of minor differences that distinguish phytosaurs from true crocodiles. For one thing, the phytosaur ankle structure is much more primitive than that of any crocodile. Also, phytosaurs lack the true bony secondary palate that enables crocodiles to strengthen their skulls and breathe even when their mouths are full of water. However, phytosaurs do possess a somewhat analogous structure that is derived from the ventral part of the extremely elongated premaxillae (a premaxillary palate), which works to displace the internal nasal openings (choanae) backwards, although the external nares being positioned far back on the top skull helps to bring the choanae back by itself in the first place, resulting in the premaxillary palate not being able to act as a partition between the nasal and buccal cavities in some genera such as Ebrachiosuchus, although still acting to strengthen the skull. In life, it is possible that phytosaurs had a fleshy palate in addition to the premaxillary palate, which would help complete the separation between the aforementioned nasal and oral cavities. Phytosaurs were even better armoured than crocodiles, protected by heavy bony scutes (often found as fossils), and the belly reinforced with a dense arrangement of gastralia (abdominal ribs). Finally, and most noticeably, phytosaurs had nostrils placed near or above the level of the eyes, in contrast to crocodiles where the nostrils are near the end of the snout. This adaptation may have developed to allow them to breathe while the rest of the body was submerged.

=== Teeth ===
Unlike most crocodilians, phytosaurs have tooth serrations.

In a 2001 study of the biomechanics of the dinosaur Albertosaurus's teeth, William L. Abler also examined a phytosaur's teeth, finding that it has had serrations so fine that they resembled a crack in the tooth. Albertosaurus had similarly crack-like serrations, but, at the base of each serration Abler discovered a round void, which would have functioned to distribute force over a larger surface area. This void, termed an ampulla, would hinder the ability of the "crack" formed by the serration to propagate through the tooth. The phytosaur was found to lack adaptations for preventing its dental "cracks" from propagating. Abler examined another sort of prehistoric predator, Dimetrodon, and found that it also lacked adaptations for guarding against crack propagation. Based on their teeth, most phytosaur genera are carnivorous, piscivorous, or a combination of the two. However, two taxa show slight adaptations towards hunting and consuming harder invertebrates.

A study on phytosaur microwear patterns has found Mystriosuchus to line with soft invertebrate consumers, Nicrosaurus with hard invertebrate consumers and Smilosuchus and Machaeroprosopus with carnivores and piscivores.

=== Locomotion and terrestriality ===
Phytosaurs have been traditionally held as rather "primitive" animals in regards to terrestrial locomotion, particularly in regards to archosaurs such as crocodilians, lacking the erect gait seen in these, other pseudosuchians, dinosaurs and pterosaurs. However, the Apatopus ichnofossil shows that the animals did in fact have an erect gait like their archosaur relatives.

Most phytosaurs are thought to be aquatic animals, and indeed most do show adaptations for such a lifestyle; swim tracks attributed to phytosaurs, for example, are known. However, at least Nicrosaurus seems to have evolved towards a secondarily terrestrial lifestyle, developing longer limb bones, straighter femora and a deeper pelvis, and indeed occurs in terrestrial or marginal lacustrine settings. Combined with its deep upper jaw, it probably led a similar lifestyle to terrestrial predatory crocodylomorphs like sebecians.

Inversely, some dolichorostral forms like Mystriosuchus have become further specialised to life in the water, and occurred in marine environments. A skeleton of Mystriosuchus planirostris, found in a marine setting and with evidence of little post-mortem transportation – indicating that it died either at sea or in a freshwater environment nearby – shows that this animal had paddle-like limbs, less adapted for terrestrial locomotion than in most other phytosaurs. Furthermore, the tail of Mystriosuchus was laterally compressed and could have been used in propulsion.

=== Endocast studies ===
Scans on various phytosaur braincases suggest that these animals generally had long olfactory tracts, weakly demarcated cerebral regions, dorsoventrally short endosseous labyrinths and various sinuses, including large antorbital and dural venous ones; the general bauplan is vaguely similar to that of crocodilians, but differs significantly in the presence of multiple sinuses, smaller cerebral hemispheres and smaller endosseous labyrinths. The similarities are considered to be plesiomorphic in relation to the ancestral archosauriform design, lacking many features seen in avemetatarsalians, though convergence in terms of lifestyle might also play a role.

=== Reproduction ===
No phytosaur eggs have been found so far. There are pits associated with footprints in the Chinle Formation, but these "nests" are apparently the result of sandstone weathering. A recent study suggests they might have had parental care.

=== Oral tissues ===
Unlike crocodilians, which are lipless, phytosaurs are inferred to have lizard-like lips.

== History ==
When the first phytosaur fossils were found, it was not immediately obvious what kind of animal/species they were. The first phytosaur species known to science was ambiguously referred to by G. Jaeger in 1828 as "the genus of Phytosaurus, which I call Cylindricodon." The collective group name, meaning "plant lizard with cylindrical teeth," was coined due to Jaeger's mistaken belief that petrified mud fillings in the jaw were herbivore teeth.

Authorship of the genus name Phytosaurus is credited to Wagler, 1830, who was the first person to unambiguously use the binomen Phytosaurus cylindricodon when describing Jaeger's findings. This commonly used genus name Phytosaurus Wagler, 1830, is invalid according to ICZN code as a junior homonym of the collective-group name Phytosaurus Jaeger, 1828 (per Article 39).

The name of the group – Phytosauria – was coined on the basis of Phytosaurus named by Jæger (1828). However, while the name Phytosaurus is available as a collective-group name, it was originally not introduced simultaneously as a family-group name and genus-group name, with both categories being mutually exclusive, so it does not conform to the ICZN (ICZN) article 1.2.2. While the nominal genus Phytosaurus as named by Wagler (1830) is available, it represents a junior homonym. Its usage as a family-group name also does not conform to various ICZN articles (11.7.1.1, & 11.7.2, & 29, & 63, & 64); it was not named in the nominative plural, so the authorship of Phytosauria purportedly should not be attributed Meyer (1861) but to Baur (1894), and not subsequently used as valid in the family-group taxon. The 2022 study suggested that while the class-group names Parasuchia and Belodontia and the family-group name Belodontidae could be used instead of Phytosauria and Phytosauridae, the best solution to resolve this taxonomic issue would be to designate a neotype for Belodon plieningeri due to the taxonomic restrictions to the name Belodon.

The second species to be described was Belodon plieningeri by von Meyer in von Meyer and Plieninger 1844. The altogether more appropriate name Parasuchia ("alongside the crocodiles", as they resembled crocodiles to a great degree) was coined by Thomas Huxley in 1875 along with his discovery and naming of the Indian species Parasuchus hislopi (Chatterjee, 1978), on the basis of a partial snout. The specimen is usually considered non-diagnostic, and the name Parasuchus is replaced by Paleorhinus.

The name phytosaur remains the standard vernacular for these animals, despite its invalid status by ICZN code and the fact that these animals have been clearly shown to be carnivorous. More valid names for the clade include Parasuchia (Huxley, 1875) and Belodontia (Brauns, 1890), which are preferred for formal classification.

== Evolutionary history ==
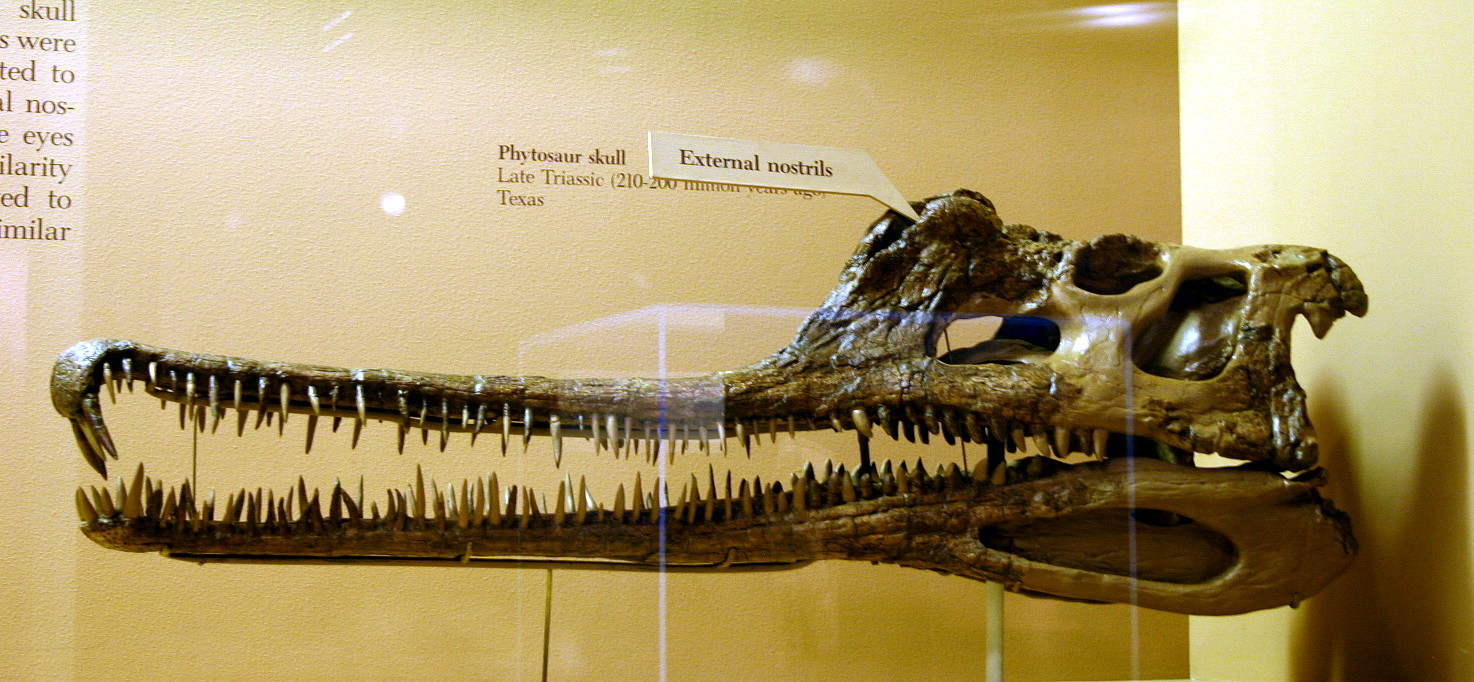
Phytosaur skull

Phytosaurs first appeared during the Carnian or Ladinian age, evolving from an unknown crurotarsan ancestor. There are no clear intermediate forms, as even the earliest known phytosaurs are highly specialized aquatic animals, unlike most contemporary archosauriforms that were terrestrial. However, a recent study has suggested that Diandongosuchus is a basal phytosaur. If this is the case, this taxon offers more of a bridge between phytosaurs and earlier Archosauriformes.

The earliest phytosaurs are traditionally classified in the genus Paleorhinus, now thought to be polyphyletic. Parasuchus and related basal species were widely distributed, meaning that phytosaurs dispersed across Pangea early on and there were probably few geographical barriers for their distribution; only in the southernmost regions are they rare, possibly due to increased aridity.

A somewhat more advanced and larger form, Angistorhinus appears at the same time or soon after. Later in the Carnian, both these animals were replaced by more specialised forms like Rutiodon, Leptosuchus, and the huge Smilosuchus (Lucas 1998). The Carnian-Norian extinction meant that these animals died off, and the Early Norian sees new genera like Nicrosaurus and Pseudopalatus, both of which belong to the most derived clade of phytosaurs, the Pseudopalatinae. Later in the middle Norian the advanced and specialised fish-eater Mystriosuchus appears. Fossil remains of this widespread animal is known from Germany, northern Italy, and Thailand. Finally the large Redondasaurus in southwest North America and the long-snouted (altirostral) Angistorhinopsis ruetimeyeri in Europe continued the group into the Rhaetian. Phytosaur footprints (the ichnotaxon Apatopus) are also known from the latest Rhaetian of the East Coast of USA (the Newark Supergroup) (Olsen et al. 2002). This indicates that phytosaurs continued as successful animals until the very end of the Triassic, when, along with many other large crurotarsan reptiles, they were killed off by the end Triassic extinction event, about 200 Ma ago.

There have been reports of phytosaur remains found in lowermost Jurassic rocks. Several teeth from Early Jurassic deposits in France have been identified as phytosaur teeth, but other studies argue they have either been misidentified or were reworked from Late Triassic into Early Jurassic deposits. In 1951, a partial upper jaw was discovered in the Early Jurassic Lower Lufeng Series in China and described as a new genus of phytosaur, Pachysuchus, but a study in 2012 reinterpreted the fossil as a sauropodomorph dinosaur.

A fragment of a lower jaw from a longirostrine archosaur has been described from early Hettangian strata in the town of Watchet in Somerset, England. While teleosaurid thalattosuchians had similar longirostrine jaws to phytosaurs and were common in the Jurassic, they do not appear in the earliest Jurassic rocks. The mandible is more similar to those of known phytosaurs than to thalattosuchians, and likely belongs to a phytosaur closely related to the genus Mystriosuchus. The presence of phytosaurs in the earliest Jurassic may have prevented thalattosuchians from occupying similar ecological niches at that time. However, more recent work suggests that the jaw fragment came from a pre-Hettangian rock unit, and is therefore Late Triassic in age. Also, if the age of the Magnesian Conglomerate does extend into the Early Jurassic (Hettangian), then it is possible that Rileyasuchus survived into the Early Jurassic.

In August 2025, Indian media reported a ~1.5–2 m-long fossil from Megha village near Jaisalmer (Lathi Formation, Rajasthan) that was preliminarily identified as a phytosaur from Jurassic-age strata, with an egg-like fossil noted alongside the skeleton. If confirmed, this would represent well-preserved phytosaur material from Jurassic rocks in India; researchers emphasized the identification is preliminary and subject to further study.

== Classification ==
=== Genera ===
Genus	Status	Age	Location	Unit	Notes	Images
Angistorhinopsis	Junior synonym				Junior synonym of Nicrosaurus	
Angistorhinus	Valid	Late Carnian	Morocco; US	Argana Formation; Dockum Group; Popo Agie Formation		
Arganarhinus	Valid	Middle Carnian	Morocco	Argana Formation		
Arribasuchus	Junior synonym				Junior synonym of Machaeroprosopus	
Belodon	Nomen dubium	Middle Norian	Germany; US	Stubensandstein; Chinle Formation	Many remains have since been attributed to other animals or given their own genera	
Brachysuchus	Valid	Carnian	US	"Pre-Tecovas Horizon" (Dockum Group)		
Calamosuchus	Valid	Carnian	Germany	Stuttgart Formation	A genus name for "Zanclodon" arenaceus; a possible early-diverging phytosaur, previously argued to belong outside this clade	
Centemodon	Nomen dubium	Norian	US	Cumnock Formation	Named from several teeth in 1856	
Coburgosuchus	Valid	Norian	Germany			
Colossosuchus	Valid	Carnian-Norian	India	Tiki Formation		
?Diandongosuchus	Valid	Ladinian	China	Falang Formation	Possibly the basalmost phytosaur	
Ebrachosuchus	Valid	Late Carnian	Germany	Hassberge Formation		
Francosuchus	Nomen dubium	Late Carnian	Germany	Hassberge Formation		
Leptosuchus	Valid	Carnian	US	Tecovas Formation and unknown formation (Dockum Group)		
Machaeroprosopus	Valid	Carnian-Norian	US	Chinle Formation; Dockum Group		
Mesorhinosuchus	? Valid	Triassic, ? early Olenekian	Germany	? Middle Buntsandstein		
Mystriosuchus	Valid	Middle Norian	Germany	Stubensandstein		
Nicrosaurus	Valid	Late Norian – Rhaetian	France; Germany	Arnstadt Formation; Upper Keuper		
"Paleorhinus"	Junior synonym	Late Carnian	Germany; Poland; US; Lithuania	Hassberge Formation; Middle Keuper; Cooper Canyon Formation; Popo Agie Formation; Tecovas Formation; Nemunas Formation	Polyphyletic.	
Parasuchus	Valid	Late Carnian – Early Norian	India	Lower Maleri Formation; Tiki Formation		
Pravusuchus	Valid	Norian	US	Chinle Formation		
Promystriosuchus	Valid					
Protome	Valid	Norian	US	Chinle Formation		
Pseudopalatus	Junior synonym				Junior synonym of Machaeroprosopus	
Redondasaurus	Valid	Norian – Rhaetian	US	Redonda Formation; Travesser Formation		
Rutiodon	Valid	Carnian	US	Newark Supergroup		
Smilosuchus	Valid	Carnian	US	Chinle Formation		
Volcanosuchus	Valid	Carnian	India	Tiki Formation		
Wannia	Valid	Carnian-Norian	US	Camp Springs Formation		

=== Phylogeny ===
Phytosaurs are generally regarded as the most basal group of Crurotarsi, a clade of archosaurs that includes crocodilians and their extinct relatives. Phytosaurs are often excluded from a clade called Suchia, which usually encompasses all other crurotarsans, including aetosaurs, rauisuchians, and crocodylomorphs. Some studies have found polytomies between phytosaurs and other groups, like Ornithosuchidae and Suchia. In these cases, it is unclear whether phytosaurs are the most basal crurotarsans. In one of the earliest studies of crurotarsan phylogeny, Sereno and Arcucci (1990) found Crurotarsi to be a monophyletic grouping consisting of phytosaurs, ornithosuchids, and the more derived suchians, but produced a trichotomy between the three groups in their tree. In resolving this trichotomy, Parrish (1993) placed ornithosuchids, not phytosaurs, as the most basal crurotarsans. However, most other studies, such as Sereno (1991) and Benton et al. (2010), recover phytosaurs in a basalmost position among crurotarsans. Below is a cladogram modified from Benton et al. (2010) showing the widely accepted phylogenetic relationships of phytosaurs:

- Archosauria
  - Avemetatarsalia
  - Crurotarsi
    - Phytosauria
    - Suchia
      - - Aetosauria
        - Crocodylomorpha
      - - Ornithosuchidae
        - Rauisuchia

A phylogenetic analysis of early archosaurs by paleontologist Sterling Nesbitt (2011) found strong support for a sister taxon relationship between phytosaurs and Archosauria. If this is the case, phytosaurs would be placed outside Pseudosuchia in a more basal position among archosauriforms. Phytosaurs would be considered closely related to the ancestors of both crocodilians and dinosaurs. Furthermore, the definition of the clade Crurotarsi would change, as it is often defined by the inclusion of phytosaurs. Thus, Crurotarsi would include phytosaurs and all other archosaurs —including dinosaurs— under this phylogeny. Below is a cladogram showing the placement of phytosaurs from Nesbitt (2011):

- Archosauriformes
  - Proterosuchus
  - - Erythrosuchus
    - - Vancleavea
      - - Proterochampsia
          - Tropidosuchus
          - Chanaresuchus
        - - Euparkeria
          - Crurotarsi
            - Phytosauria
              - Parasuchus
              - - Leptosuchus
                - Pseudopalatus
            - Archosauria
              - Pseudosuchia
              - Avemetatarsalia

The phylogenetic analysis of Stocker (2010) placed Paleorhinus outside Phytosauridae as a basal phytosaur. Under this phylogeny, Phytosauridae and Phytosauria are not synonymous. Stocker also erected the clade Leptosuchomorpha for derived phytosaurs, including Leptosuchus and Smilosuchus.

Ezcurra (2016) updated Nesbitt's analysis and found that Phytosauria was once again a group of basal pseudosuchian archosaurs. His study analyzed the ten phylogenetic traits which Nesbitt claimed were lacking in phytosaurs but not archosaurs, thus excluding phytosaurs from Pseudosuchia. Four of the traits (well-developed palatal processes of the maxilla which meet at the midline, an elongated cochlear recess, a tuber on the lateral side of the ulna, and a particular orientation of the calcaneal tuber) were confirmed to support Nesbitt's placement of Phytosauria. However, one of the ten traits was found in Euparkeria (an abducens nerve exit foramen only present in the prootic) and another was found in proterochampsians (a swollen biceps tubercule), so their lack in phytosaurs may be reversals rather than basal traits. Another one of the traits (an antorbital fossa contacting the horizontal process of the maxilla) was found in the basal phytosaur Parasuchus. One trait (short metacarpals compared to metatarsals) was difficult to analyze in any crurotarsan, and another (a medial tuber on the femur) was found in both proterochampsids and Parasuchus. One trait (a divided tibial facet of the astragalus) was also lacking in Marasuchus and Nundasuchus, and therefore had a variable existence in Archosauria. This reanalysis, along with the observance of many traits linking Phytosauria with pseudosuchians, concluded that it was more likely that phytosaurs were pseudosuchians than non-archosaur archosauriforms. The following cladogram is a simplified version the fourth strict reduced consensus tree of Ezcurra's third phylogenetic analyses within his study. This cladogram only shows taxa from the group Eucrocopoda.

- Eucrocopoda
  - Dorosuchus
  - - Euparkeria
    - - Dongusuchus
      - Yarasuchus
    - - Proterochampsia
        - Doswelliidae
        - Proterochampsidae
      - Archosauria
        - Ornithodira
        - Pseudosuchia
          - Phytosauria
            - - Parasuchus hislopi
              - Parasuchus angustifrons
            - - Nicrosaurus kapfii
              - Smilosuchus spp.
          - - Nundasuchus
            - - Ornithosuchidae
              - Suchia

== Paleoecology ==
In the Late Triassic coprolite which could belong to a phytosaur, eggs of nematodes and probably protozoan cysts were found.

== Sources ==
- Abler, W.L. 2001. A kerf-and-drill model of tyrannosaur tooth serrations. p. 84–89. In: Mesozoic Vertebrate Life. Ed.s Tanke, D. H., Carpenter, K., Skrepnick, M. W. Indiana University Press.
- Carroll, R.L. (1988). Vertebrate Paleontology and Evolution, WH Freeman & Co.
- Chatterjee, S. (1978). A primitive parasuchid (phytosaur) reptile from the Upper Triassic Maleri Formation of India, Palaeontology 21: 83–127
- Hungerbühler, A. (2002). The Late Triassic phytosaur Mystriosuchus Westphali, with a revision of the genus. Palaeontology 45 (2): 377–418
- Jaeger, G.F. 1828. Über die fossilen Reptilien, welche in Würtemberg aufgefunden worden sind. Metzler, Stuttgart.
- Kimmig, J. & Arp, G. (2010) Phytosaur remains from the Norian Arnstadt Formation (Leine Valley, Germany), with reference to European phytosaur habitats. Palaeodiversity 3: 215–224
- Lucas, S.G. (1998). Global Triassic tetrapod biostratigraphy and biochronology. Paleogeog. Palaeoclimatol., Palaeoecol. 143: 347–384.
- Maisch, M.W.; Kapitzke, M. (2010). "A presumably marine phytosaur (Reptilia: Archosauria) from the pre-planorbis beds (Hettangian) of England". Neues Jahrbuch für Geologie und Paläontologie - Abhandlungen. 257 (3): 373–379. Bibcode:2010NJGPA.257..373M. doi:10.1127/0077-7749/2010/0076.
- Olsen, P.E., Kent, D.V., H.-D.Sues, Koeberl, C., Huber, H., Montanari, E.C.Rainforth, A., Fowell, S.J., Szajna, M.J., and Hartline, B.W., (2002). Ascent of dinosaurs linked to an iridium anomaly at the Triassic-Jurassic boundary. Science 296: 1305–1307.
- Stocker, Michelle R. (2010). "A new taxon of phytosaur (Archosauria: Pseudosuchia) from the Late Triassic (Norian) Sonsela Member (Chinle Formation) in Arizona, and a critical reevaluation of Leptosuchus, Case, 1922". Palaeontology. 53 (5): 997–1022. Bibcode:2010Palgy..53..997S. doi:10.1111/j.1475-4983.2010.00983.x. S2CID 83536253.
- Ballew, K.L. (1989). A phylogenetic analysis of Phytosauria from the Late Triassic of the Western United States. Dawn of the age of dinosaurs in the American Southwest: pp. 309–339.
- Gregory, J.T. (1962). Genera of phytosaurs. American Journal of Science, 260: 652–690.
- Long, R.A. & Murry, P.A. (1995). Late Triassic (Carnian and Norian) tetrapods from the southwestern United States. New Mexico Museum of Natural History and Science Bulletin, 4: 1–254.
