= Atreipus =

Trace fossil classification
- Domain: Eukaryota
- Kingdom: Animalia
- Phylum: Chordata
- Ichnofamily: †Atreipodidae
- Ichnogenus: †Atreipus; Olsen & Baird, 1986

Type ichnospecies
- †Atreipus milfordensis (Bock, 1952)

Ichnospecies
- †Atreipus milfordensis (Bock, 1952); †Atreipus metzneri (Heller, 1952); †Atreipus sulcatus (Baird, 1957); †Atreipus acadianus Olsen & Baird, 1986

Synonyms
- Aetripus Martin & Hasiotis, 1998

Dinosaur trace fossil

Atreipus is an ichnogenus or trace fossil attributed to early Ornithischian dinosaurs. Its significance for Triassic biostratigraphy has earned it some fame. Reptile footprint faunules from the early Mesozoic Newark Supergroup of eastern North America.

== See also ==
- Ichnology
