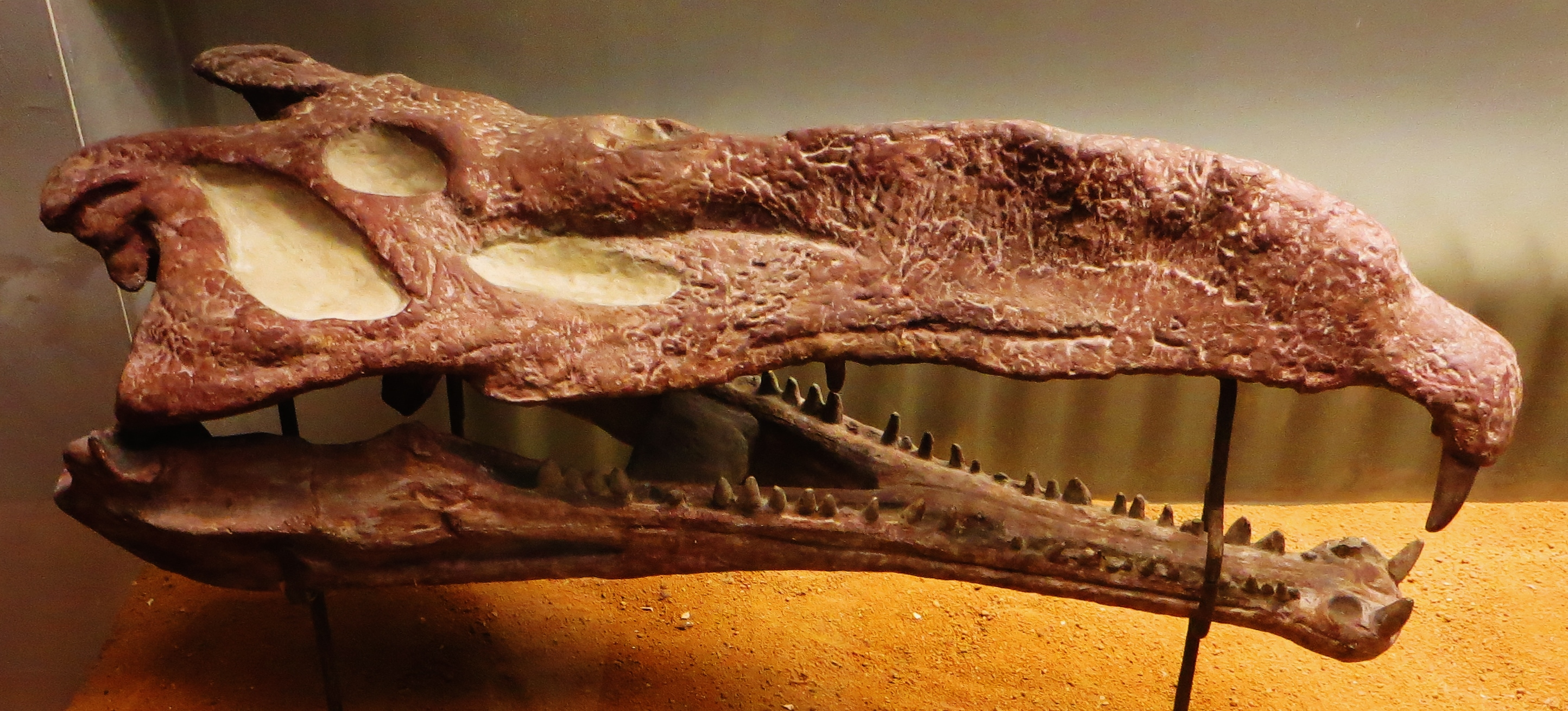
- Skull of N. kapffi

Scientific classification
- Kingdom: Animalia
- Phylum: Chordata
- Class: Reptilia
- Order: †Phytosauria
- Family: †Parasuchidae
- Subfamily: †Mystriosuchinae
- Tribe: †Mystriosuchini
- Genus: †Nicrosaurus; Fraas, 1866

Species
- †N. kapffi (Meyer, 1861) (type); †N. meyeri (Hungerbühler & Hunt, 2000)

= Nicrosaurus =

Nicrosaurus Temporal range: Late Triassic, 228–201.6 Ma

Extinct genus of reptiles

Nicrosaurus (/nɪkroʊˈsɔrəs/) is an extinct genus of phytosaur reptile that lived during the Late Triassic period. Although it looked like a crocodile (and probably lived like the more terrestrial crocodylomorphs), it was not closely related to them, instead being an example of parallel evolution.

The main difference between Nicrosaurus (and all other phytosaurs) and modern crocodiles is the position of the nostrils. Nicrosaurus's nostrils, or external nares, were placed directly in front of the forehead (much like modern-day cetaceans, such as whales, dolphins, and porpoises), whereas in crocodiles, the nostrils are positioned on the end of the snout. A 2013 study has also found that the ilium of Nicrosaurus is quite distinctive from all other phytosaurs. The genus was named by German paleontologist, Oscar Fraas, in 1866, possibly after the Neckar river of southwestern Germany, near which it was found.

== Description and paleobiology ==
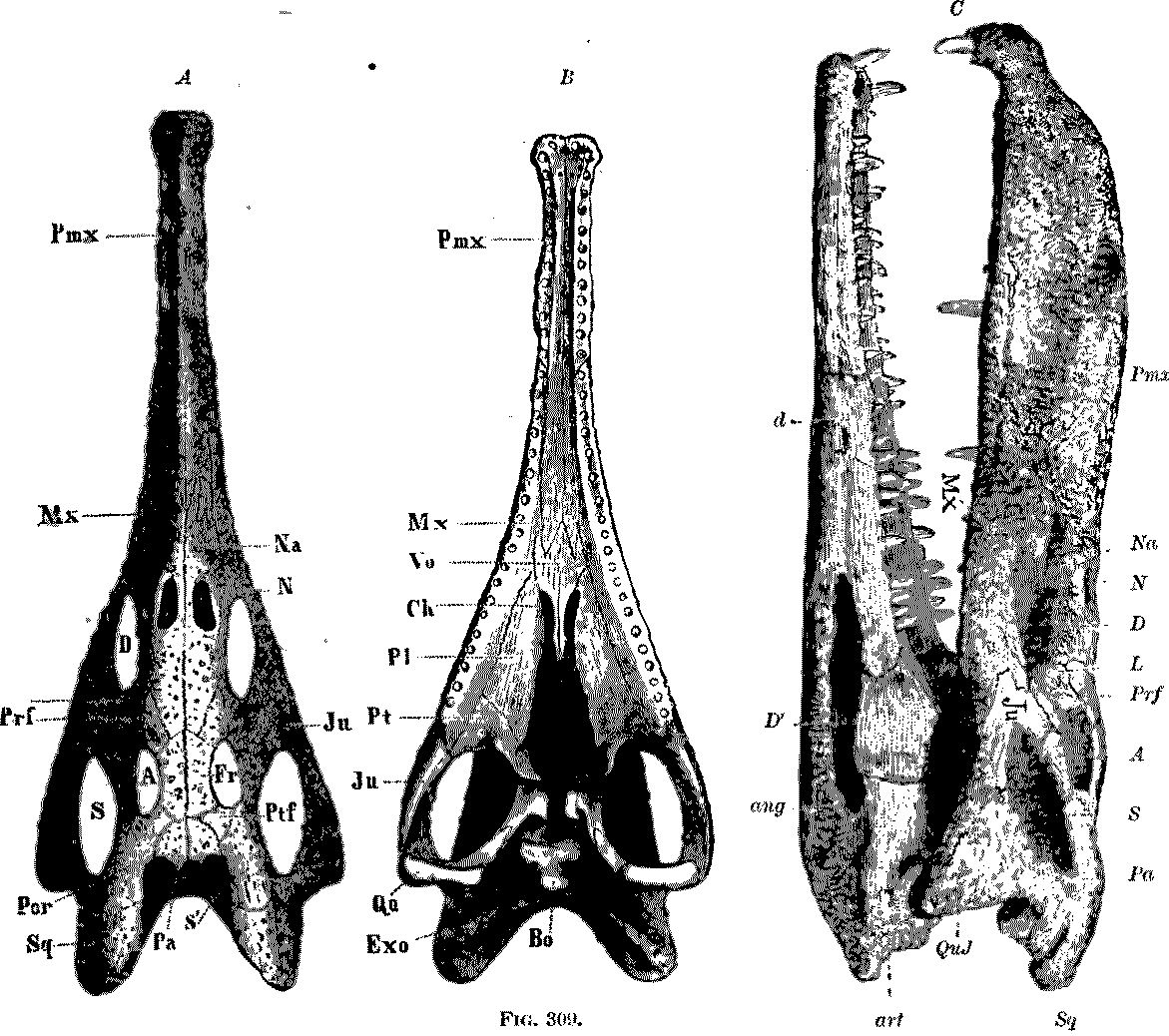
N. kapffi skull, from Zittel, 1913

Some distinguishing anatomical features of Nicrosaurus are the external nares at the skull roof level, the dorsoventrally compressed and rounded posterior squamosal processes, the broad and heavy rostrum and a strong prenarial crest.

Nicrosaurus may have been more terrestrial than other phytosaurs. Occurring in marginal-lacustrine or outrightly terrestrial settings, it bears longer limb bones, a straighter femur and a deeper pelvis than other phytosaurs. Combined with its unusually deep upper jaw and heterodont teeth, it was most likely a secondarily terrestrial predator, probably not at all dissimilar from terrestrial crocodylomorphs like sebecians.

=== Teeth ===
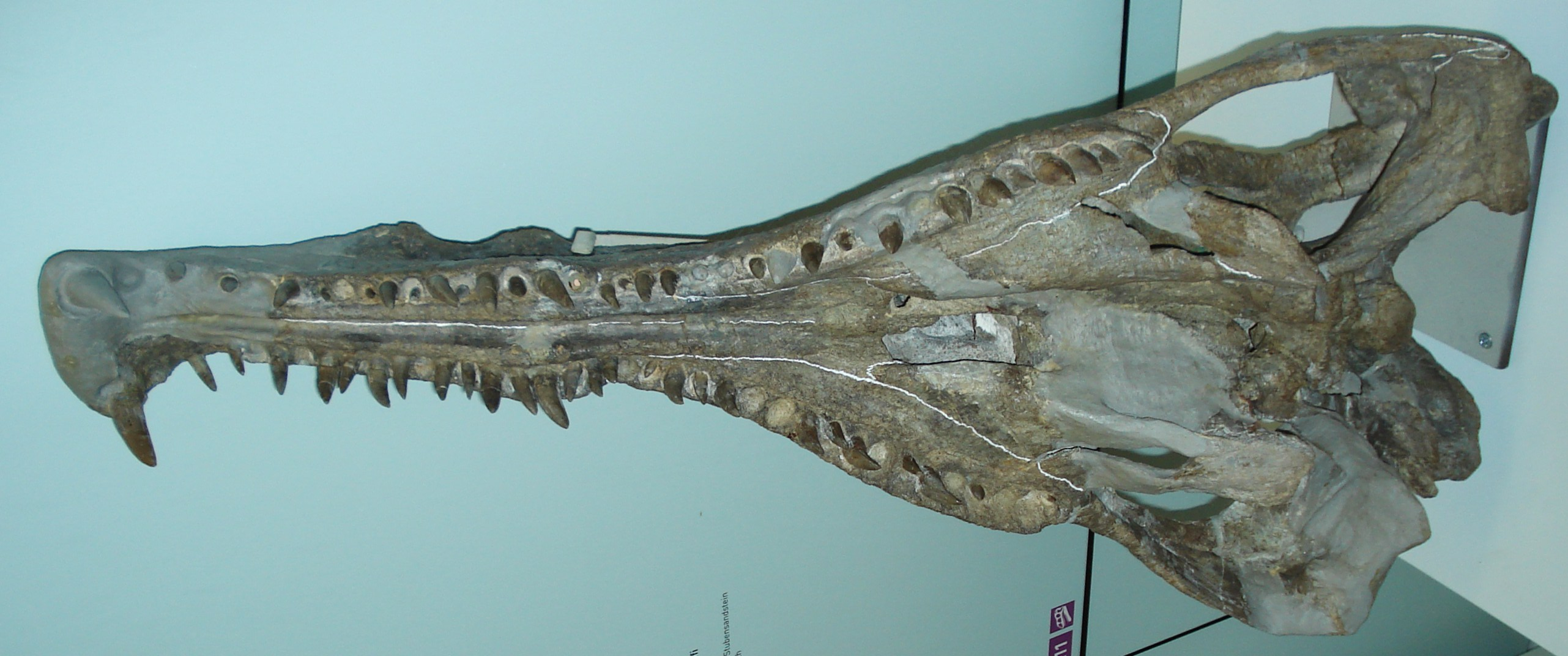
Underside of skull, Stuttgart

Nicrosaurus dentition is highly heterodont, the tooth shapes varying from wide, laterally compressed blade teeth to cylindrical, recurved caniniform teeth.

In terms of jaw morphology, a full prenarial crest is a distinctive anatomical feature for Nicrosaurus kapffi. In both the upper and lower jaw, the dentition has five morphologically separated arrays of teeth: tip-of-snout set, premaxilla set, maxilla set, tip-of-mandible set, and dentary set. Moving posteriorly in all of these sets, except the tip-of-the-snout and tip-of-mandible sets, tooth morphology starts out relatively simple and undifferentiated and gradually changes, resulting in a morphocline. The upper dentition is considered to be tripartite.

The anteriormost teeth, or carinae, of the premaxilla set in Nicrosaurus kapffi are enlarged and strongly curved. These are usually the largest teeth of the upper jaw. Much of the other anterior teeth in this set, as well as in the maxilla, are difficult to distinguish from one another.

The anteriormost teeth of the premaxilla are firmly anchored and labially vaulted.

The number of tooth positions is highly variable for the premaxilla and maxilla set. However, no studies indicate that there is a direct correlation between tooth count and skull size. Teeth rows usually consist of 40-45 members.

The tripartite dentition, enlarged carinae,(incorrect link) and strong terminal members of the premaxilla suggest that Nicrosaurus kapffi (and many other phytosaurs) may be adapted to dismember medium to large-sized prey after killing such prey with a strong, quick blow.

Nicrosaurus in general have massive snouts similar to extant crocodilians, suggesting they preyed on tetrapods instead of fish.

=== Distinctive post-cranial features ===
All derived phytosaurs have an ilium that is characterized by a blade that elongates posteriorly and an anterior process that is short in length. However, compared to all phytosaurs, the ilium of Nicrosaurus kapffi is dorso-ventrally elongated, similar to that of Erythrosucus africanus. Because of the elongation, the acetabulum is also longer relative to other phytosaurs. Compared to Leptosuchus the angle between the pubis and ischium is also greater. In Nicrosaurus, the proximal end the humerus is flattened.

=== Semi-aquatic or terrestrial nature ===
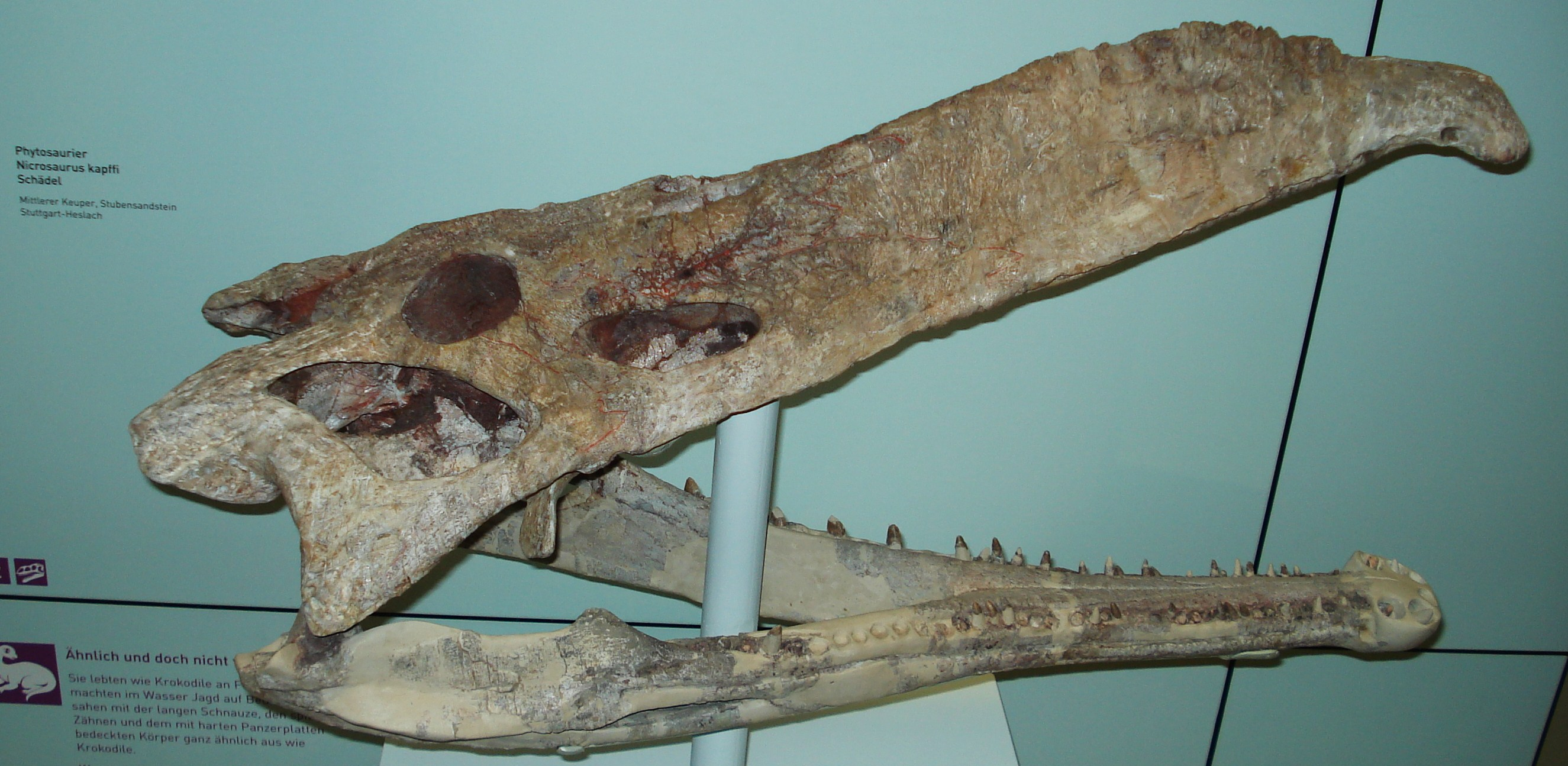
Side view of skull, Stuttgart.

Because of their resemblance to modern crocodiles, it was initially thought that phytosaurs were also semi-aquatic animals. The slender jaws further suggested a diet containing fish. An earlier study explained that more massive Nicrosaurus could have also had a diet consisting of large land reptiles which came near waters or amphibians of streams and ponds.

When it comes to phytosaurs, most inferences on ecology are in comparison with modern day crocodilians. However, genera within phytosaurs may also have had different ecological preferences. Such is the case for Nicrosaurus and Mystriosuchus, the biggest distinguishing factor between the two being the shape of their snouts. The latter had a slender skull with bipartite dentition, suggesting a diet of fish and small tetrapods, while the former had a massive skull with tripartite dentition, suggesting prey were larger animals.

Nicrosaurus and Mystriosuchus have both been recovered in the first and second Stubensandstein in arkosic sandstones separated by floodplain mudstones and were both buried during flooding events in a freshwater river habitat. Both genera appeared at around the same time in central Europe. Additionally, because Nicrosaurus has also been found lacustrine sandstones, aerially exposed planes with breccia and reworked palaeosols, a terrestrial and swamp-inhabiting lifestyle seems probable.

A more recent analysis on available post-cranial bones has provided results that further support the idea of Nicrosaurus being primarily terrestrial. The ilium and femur of Nicrosaurus are similar to those of Archosaurs in comparison to semi-aquatic Archosaurs, like today's crocodiles. The resemblance suggests Nicrosaurus could have had a more upright walking style that is often associated with terrestrial organisms.

=== Diet ===
A study on phytosaur microwear patterns shows that both Nicrosaurus species had mixed diets, with Nicrosaurus kapffi probably consuming both fish and tetrapods, while Nicrosaurus meyeri generally plotting in similar areas of the texture–dietary spaces as N. kapffi, overlapping most strongly with carnivores, piscivores, and hard invertebrate consumers.

== Species characters ==
The following are a list of characters for both species of Nicrosaurus following a phylogenetic analysis.

Nicrosaurus kapffi (Meyer, 1860): SMNS 4378, 4379, 5726, 5727; NHMUK PV OR 43743. Nicrosaurus meyeri (Hungerbühler and Hunt, 2000): SMNS 12598 (holotype), 4059; NHMUK PV OR 42745.

=== Nicrosaurus kapffi ===
- Long snout
- Ventrally convex alveolar rim of maxilla
- Tripartite upper dentition
- Posterior rim of nares behind anterior rim of antorbital fenestra
- Infranasal recess present
- Reduced antorbital fossa
- Convex interorbitonasal fenestra
- Strongly developed medial lamella of postorbito-squamosal bar, supratemporal fenestra reduced to slit
- Medial parts of squamosal processes of parietals overhand supraoccipital shelf
- Moderate depression of parieto-squamosal bar (bar 15-25% of absolute skull height)
- Gently sloping dorsal edge of parieto-squamosal bar
- Squamosal, dorsoventral expansion: strongly thickened, dorsal surface of squamosal raised terminally
- Deep supraoccipital shelf
- Posttemporal fenestra delimited by contact of parietal process of squamosal, ventrolateral border of posstemporal fenestra
- Significantly reduced quadrate foramen
- Interpremaxillary fossa: narrow slit
- Anterior extent of palatine: tip extends forward beyond the posterior rim of choana
- Lateral extent of palatines: extend onto palatal vault and meet along the midline
- Suborbital fenestra: reduced to a singular oval fenestra, or subdivided into two or more small openings
- Length of interpterygoid vacuity: tiny oval indentation at posterior rim of cojoined pterygoids

=== Nicrosaurus meyeri ===
- Very long snout
- Bipartite upper dentition
- Anterior extent of septomaxilla: posterior to or at level with anterior tip of nasal
- Position of nares: posterior rim of nares behind anterior rim of antorbital fenestra
- Infranasal recess is present
- Reduced antorbital fossa
- Convex interorbitonasal area
- Moderately developed medial lamella of postorbito-squamosal bar
- Medial parts of squamosal processes of parietals overhang supraoccipital shelf
- Moderate depression of parieto-squamosal bar (15-25% absolute skull height)
- Gently sloping dorsal edge of parieto-squamosal bar
- Medial rim of squamosal along supratemporal fenestra (and posterior process): angular
- Length of posterior process of squamosal: moderate
- Lateral flange of the squamosal is absent and present
- Subsidiary opisthotic process of squamosal is present
- Depth and shape of supraoccipital shelf: deep, axis of shelf with steep slope anteriorly and terminal horizontal deflection of shelf
- Posttemporal fenestra, lateral border: delimited by the contact of the parietal process of the squamosal (dorsal border) and the paroccipital process (ventral border); lamina of the squamosal extends onto the paroccipital process, forming the ventrolateral border of posttemporal fenestra
- Exoccipital and supraoccipital shelf: broad, overhang foramen magnum and occipital condyle
- Significantly reduced quadrate foramen
- Interpremaxillary fossa: present, narrow slit
- Anterior extent of palatine: tip extends forward beyond the posterior rim of choana
- Lateral extent of palatines: extend onto palatal vault and meet along the midline
- Suborbital fenestra: elongated, slit-like
- Length of interpterygoid vacuity: tiny oval indentation at posterior rim of cojoined pterygoids

== Discovery and environment ==
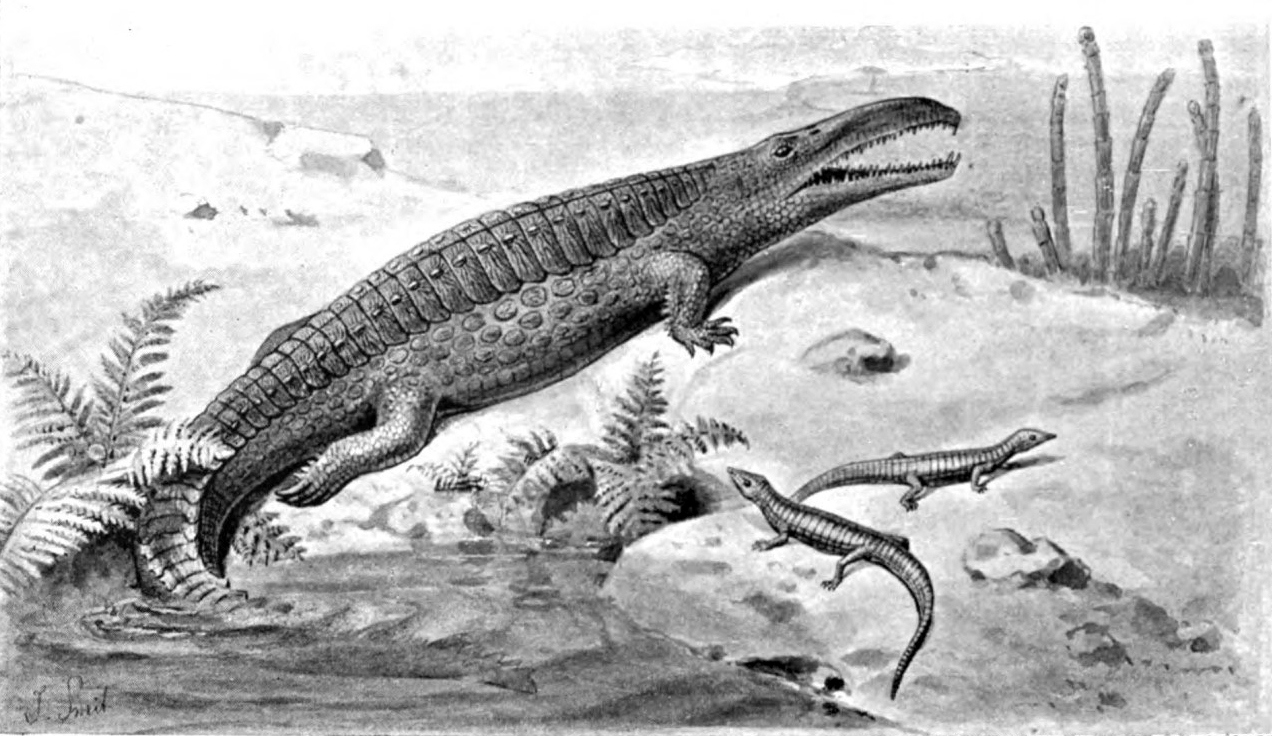
1894 restoration of Belodon, based on the skull of N. kapffi and the carapace of Paratypothorax.

Species Nicrosaurus kapffi and the less commonly found Nicrosaurus meyeri occur in the Norian Stubensandstein of southwestern Germany, as well as from the Norian Arnstadt Formation. Since 1996, the collection for Nicrosaurus kapffi included five nearly complete skulls and four partial skulls.

The Arnstadt Formation, or "Steinmergelkeuper", is primarily a lacustrine sedimentary succession of the Germanic Basin. The 100m thick Formation is divided into sediments of a playa lake system, cyclic sediments of freshwater to saline lake system, and sediments of a playa lake system with crevasse splay.

Fossil discoveries in Germany were found in dry floodplain environments or fluvial lacustrine indet., where the environment was known to be associated with either rivers or lakes or both.

An isolated tooth found in a bed among fish scales in the middle part of Arnstadt Formation in 2002 was attributed to Nicrosaurus. The rock in which the tooth and scales were found may suggest that a species of Nicrosaurus populated a swamp-like area that underwent periods of desiccation or fluctuations in salinity. Alternatively, the lone tooth may suggest that a scavenger fed on dead fish.

If the lifestyle of Nicrosaurus is limited to land and freshwater swamps it makes sense that most of fossil specimens are found around the Germanic Basin.

=== Lithology ===
Specimen have been found in various bed lithology, including sandstone, marl, dolomite, breccia, and claystone.

== Classification ==
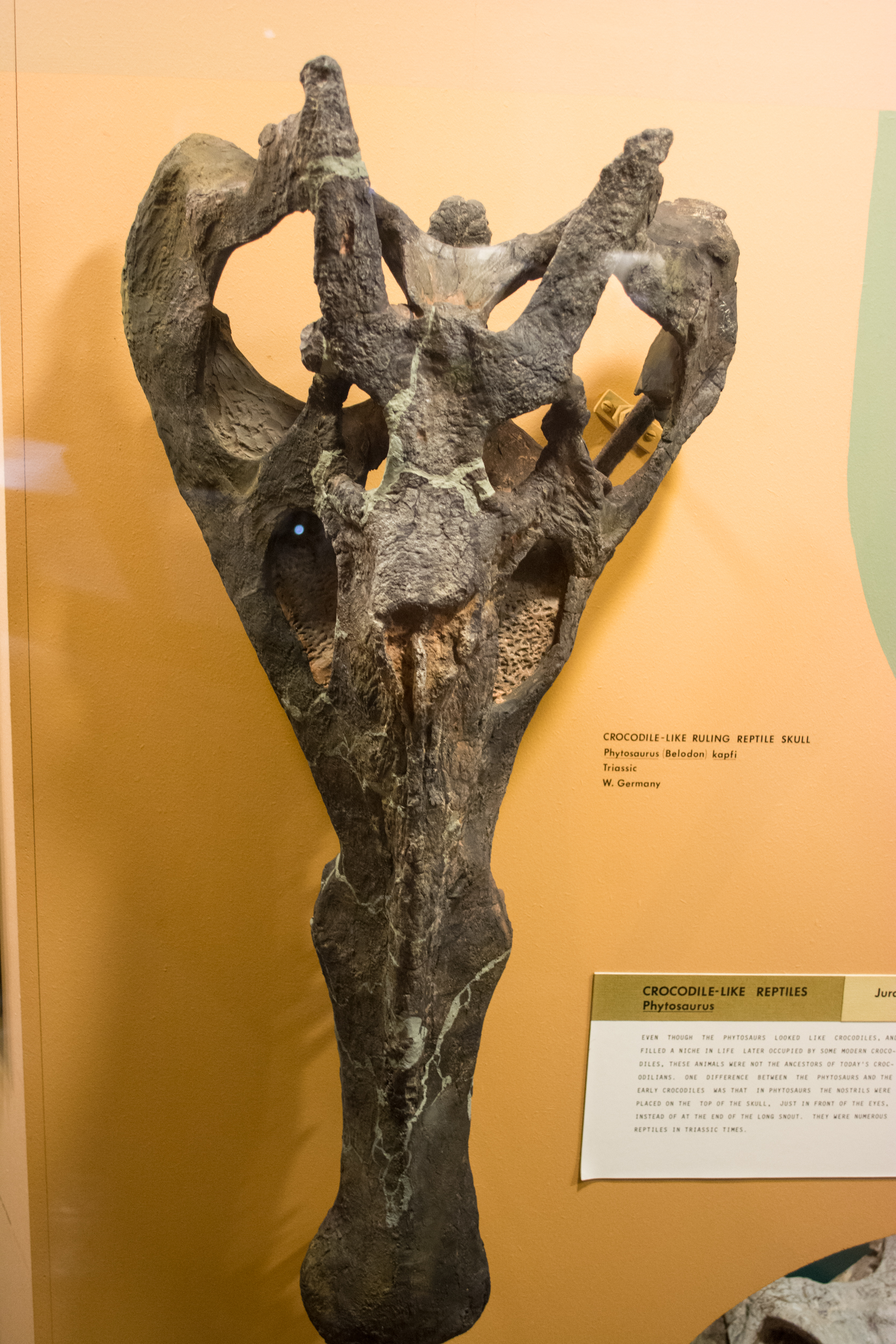
Upper side of skull

A 2002 phylogenetic analysis found that the genera Machaeroprosopus, Mystriosuchus, Redondasaurus and Nicrosaurus are all under the clade Mystriosuchini. Though, the analysis only contained one non-mystriosuchin phytosaur taxon. If Mystriosuchus and Ebrachosuchus neukami were to be sister taxa, the tree length would be 119. Nicrosaurus is considered the most basal taxon of the clade.

== Species inconsistency ==
Beyond the Nicrosaurus kapffi and Nicrosaurus meyeri, there are two other species mentioned in scientific literature: Nicrosaurus gregorii and Nicrosaurus buceros. The remains of the latter two were found in North America, from the Chama basin of north-central New Mexico.

=== Nicrosaurus gregorii ===
When phytosaur remains were thought to be first found in North America scientists attempted to categorize them into major groups. However, at the time specimen were often referred to specific genera based on character similarities without giving much regard to the differences. Such was the case when Herbert E. Gregory referred Rutiodon gregorii to Nicrosaurus.

In the early 1960s, Gregory did not recognize the differences among phytosaurs like Machaeroprosopus, Leptosuchus and Rutiodon and attributed the variance to growth, sexual dimorphism or individual variance. Most of the species of Machaeroprosopus were assigned to Rutiodon except for M. gregorii which was assigned as Phytosaurus gregorii because of the attributes it shared with European phytosaurs. Phytosaurus gregorii was later assigned as Nicrosaurus gregorii because of observed similarities in skull characteristics.

The Chinle Formation was defined first in 1917 by Herbert E. Gregory and many Norian-age vertebrae fossils were recovered from the deposit levels. Some of the skulls discovered in this region were said to be incorrectly assigned to Nicrosaurus instead of Rutiodon.

=== Nicrosaurus buceros ===
The first phytosaur taxon discovered in North America was believed to be from a skull of Belodon buceros in 1881 in the Chama basin, of north-central New Mexico. The species has also been attributed to other genera, including Pseudopalatus, Phytosaurus, Machaeroprosopus, Arribasuchus and Nicrosaurus. Some attributed the skull type to Nicrosaurus because of a few cranial characteristics, pertaining to the squamosal and supra-temporal fenestra. In comparison to Nicrosaurus kapffi, it carried a more narrow snout and therefore was referred to as Nicrosaurus buceros by some scientists.
