= Suchoprion =

Suchoprion Temporal range: Late Triassic, 221–205 Ma

Scientific classification
- Kingdom: Animalia
- Phylum: Chordata
- Class: Reptilia
- Order: †Phytosauria
- Genus: †Suchoprion; Cope, 1877

Type species
- †Suchoprion cyphodon Cope, 1877

Other species
- †S. sulcidens Cope, 1878

Extinct genus of reptiles

Suchoprion is a dubious genus of phytosaurian archosaur known from poor remains from the Late Triassic of North America. It was once thought to be a theropod dinosaur until 2013, when it was reclassified as a phytosaur.

Edward Drinker Cope named the genus Suchoprion in 1877 on the basis of a single species: S. cyphodon (the type), known only from weathered teeth (AMNH FR 2331A). The second species, S. sulcidens, was named in 1878. Both species were found in Wheatley's Copper Mines, Emigsville in Pennsylvania.
