= Blasensandstein =

- Stratigraphic range: Carnian; ~237–228 Ma
- Type: Member
- Unit of: Hassberge Formation

Lithology
- Primary: Sandstone

Location
- Coordinates: 49.3°N 10.8°E
- Approximate paleocoordinates: 21.9°N 15.8°E
- Region: Bavaria
- Country: Germany
- Blasensandstein (Germany)

The Blasensandstein is a Carnian geologic member in Bavaria, Germany. It is part of the Hassberge Formation. Fossil theropod tracks have been reported from the formation.

== See also ==
- List of dinosaur-bearing rock formations
  - List of stratigraphic units with theropod tracks
