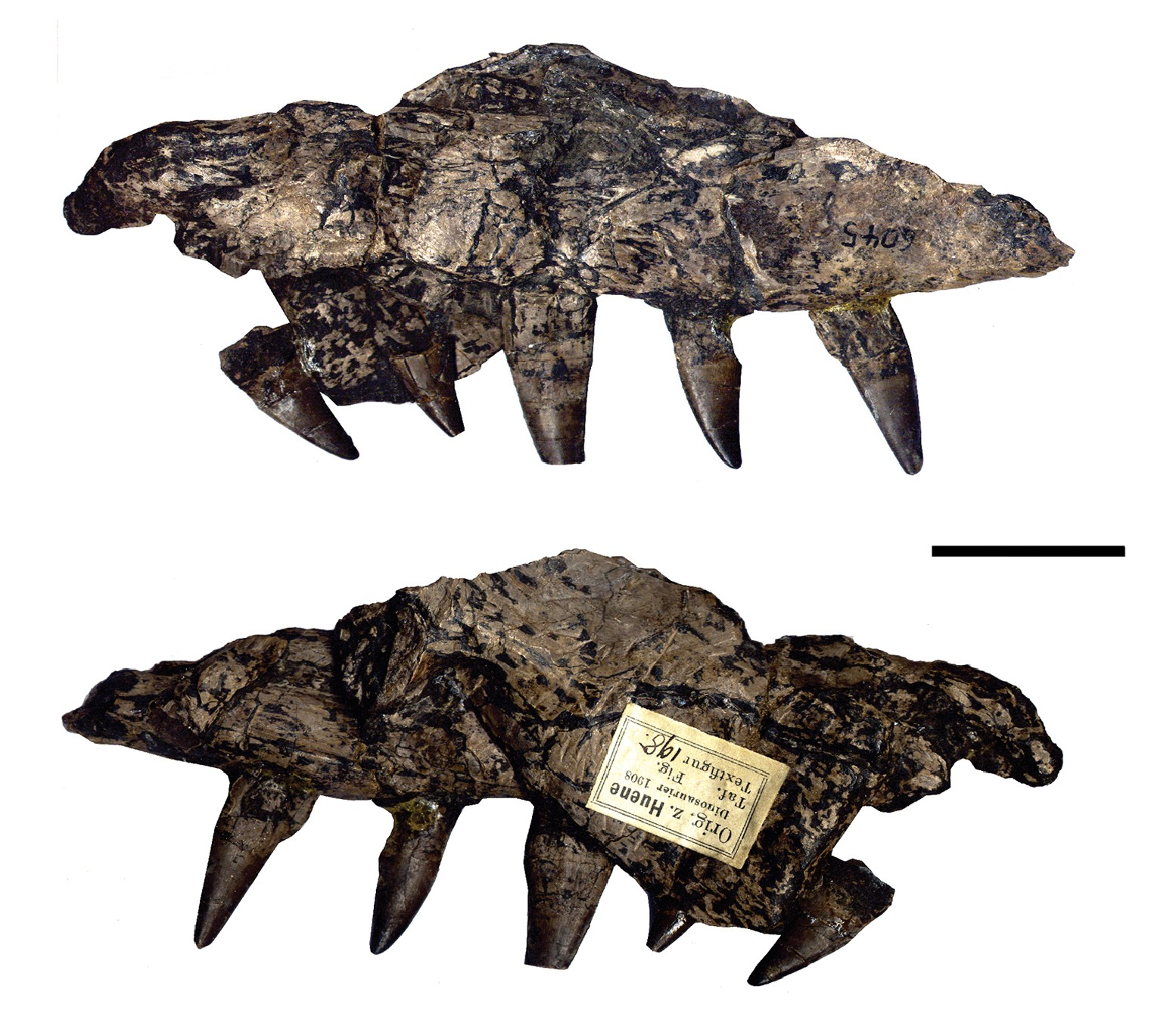
- Holotype of Z. laevis

Scientific classification
- Kingdom: Animalia
- Phylum: Chordata
- Class: Reptilia
- Clade: incertae sedis
- Genus: †Zanclodon; Plieninger, 1847

Type species
- †Zanclodon laevis (Plieninger, 1846)

Synonyms
- Plateosaurus plieningeri (Fraas, 1896); Smilodon laevis Plieninger, 1846 (preoccupied); Zanclodon plieningeri Fraas, 1896

= Zanclodon =

Zanclodon Temporal range: Middle Triassic, 237–235 Ma

Extinct genus of reptiles

Zanclodon ("scythe tooth") is an extinct genus of archosauriform from the Erfurt Formation in southern Germany. It was once a wastebasket taxon until a taxonomic revision by Schoch (2011) left only the paratype (SMNS 6045) within Zanclodon laevis proper. The type species is Z. laevis.

== Discovery and naming ==
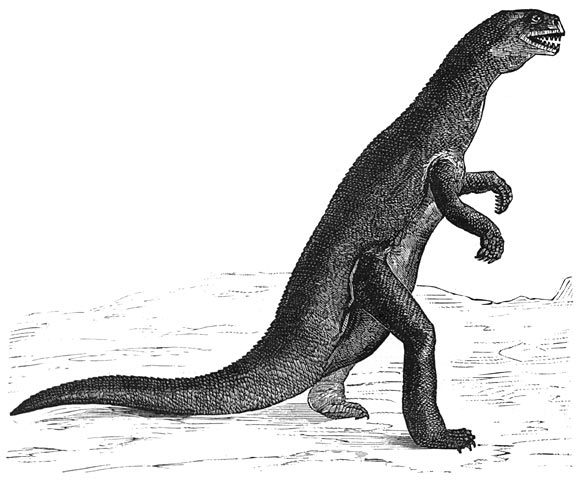
Life restoration from 1886

The paratype, SMNS 56045, a maxilla with teeth, was discovered in the Gaildorf Alumn Mine in southern Germany. Zanclodon was originally named Smilodon by Plieninger (1846), but this name had previously been used for the saber-toothed cat (a preoccupied name), prompting Plieninger to erect the replacement name Zanclodon in 1847. A paralectotype was also assigned to Z. laevis: SMNS 6045a, a loose germ tooth.

Z. plieningeri was named by Fraas in 1896, but it became a junior synonym of Z. laevis shortly after publication as they are both based on the same specimen, SMNS 6045.

Many species were previously lumped under the Zanclodon genus, but currently only the type species, Z. laevis, is accepted to belong to the genus.

== Classification ==
Zanclodon was formerly placed in the Teratosauridae, within the Theropoda, and at times, plateosaurid material was mistakenly referred to Zanclodon. It is now considered to have been an indeterminate archosauriform.

== Species ==
- Z. laevis (Plieninger, 1846) [originally "Smilodon"] (type)
- Z. crenatus (Plieninger, 1846) [originally "Smilodon"] = nomen dubium at Archosauromorpha indeterminate
- Z. bavaricus (Fraas, 1894 vide Sandberger, 1894) = Sauropodomorpha incertae sedis
- Z. plieningeri (Fraas, 1896) = junior synonym of Z. laevis
- Z. arenaceus (Fraas, 1896) = Calamosuchus arenaceus, a probable early-diverging phytosaur
- Z. cambrensis (Newton, 1899) = Newtonsaurus cambrensis, a large possibly coelophysoid theropod dinosaur
- Z. schutzii (Fraas, 1900) = Batrachotomus
- Z. silesiacus (Jaekel, 1910) = nomen dubium classified as Archosauromorpha indet.
