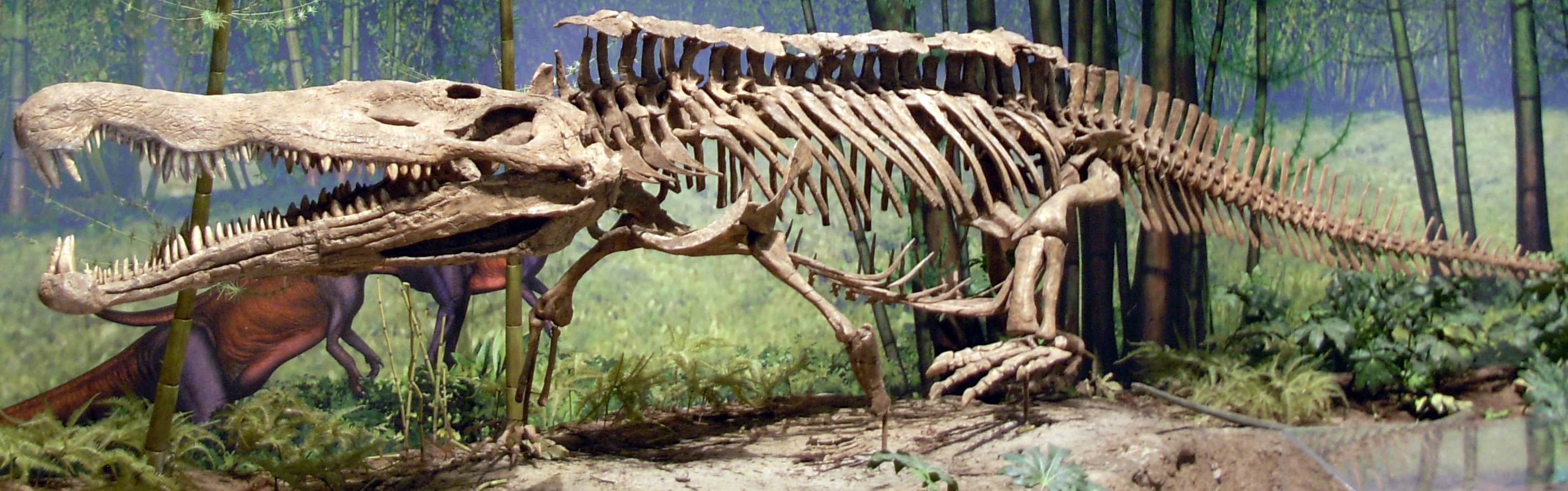
- Mounted skeleton of Redondasaurus bermani at the Carnegie Museum of Natural History

Scientific classification
- Kingdom: Animalia
- Phylum: Chordata
- Class: Reptilia
- Order: †Phytosauria
- Family: †Parasuchidae
- Subfamily: †Mystriosuchinae
- Tribe: †Mystriosuchini
- Genus: †Redondasaurus; Hunt & Lucas, 1993

Species
- †R. gregorii Hunt & Lucas, 1993; †R. bermani Hunt & Lucas, 1993

= Redondasaurus =

Redondasaurus Temporal range: Late Triassic (late Norian – Rhaetian)

Extinct genus of reptiles

Redondasaurus is an extinct genus or subgenus of phytosaur from the Late Triassic (late Norian to Rhaetian) of the southwestern United States. It was named by Hunt & Lucas in 1993, and contains two species, R. gregorii and R. bermani. It is the youngest genus of the phytosaurs.

== Specimens ==
=== Original specimens (1939-1992) ===
OMNH 1250, the first Redondasaurus specimen to be discovered, was a slender skull found in 1939 by D.E. Savage. Savage discovered the skull in the Travesser Formation of New Mexico, and originally referred it to the genus Machaeroprosopus. In 1947, another phytosaur skull (YPM 3294) was discovered by E.H. Colbert and J.T. Gregory in the Redonda Formation of New Mexico. Colbert & Gregory (1947) were the first to recognize that both skulls may represent a new taxon. In addition, they proposed that the skulls represented the most derived phytosaur species in North America, due to their supratemporal fenestrae being covered up by surrounding bones in dorsal view.

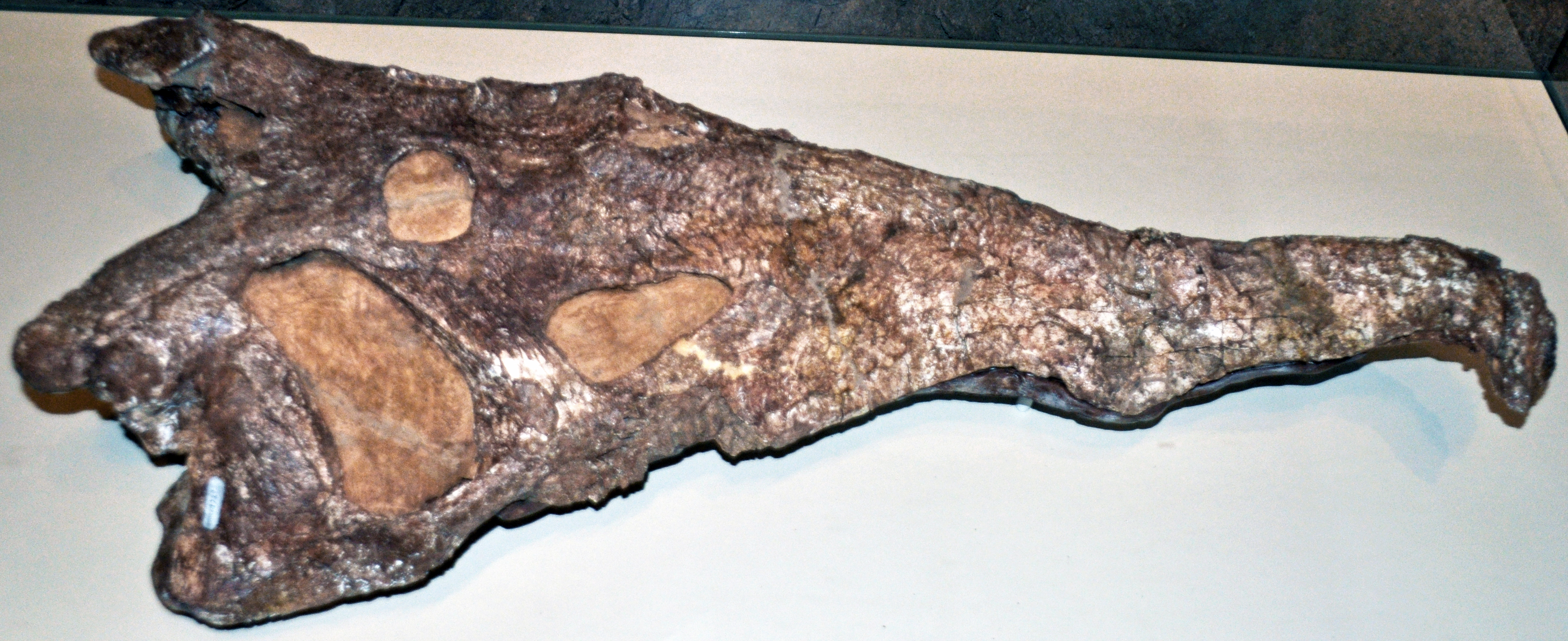
CM 69727, the holotype skull of R. bermani

A third skull (CM 69727) was discovered by D.S. Berman in the 1980s. It was recovered from the Coelophysis Quarry of Ghost Ranch near Abiquiu, New Mexico. The deposits of the Coelophysis Quarry have variably been referred to as the Rock Point Formation or the "siltstone member" of the Chinle Formation. Ballew (1989) referred the Ghost Ranch skull to Pseudopalatus (now Machaeroprosopus) buceros.

=== Redondasaurus named (1993) ===
The genus Redondasaurus was named by A.P. Hunt and S.G. Lucas in 1993. The name Redondasaurus is derived from the Redonda Formation and the Greek word "saurus," meaning lizard. The Redonda Formation is named after Mesa Redonda near Tucumcari, New Mexico. The authors had previously mentioned the unnamed phytosaur species in a 1992 paper on "Triassic Stratigraphy and Paleontology" in New Mexico.

Hunt & Lucas (1993) named two new species for Redondasaurus. Redondasaurus gregorii consisted of Colbert & Gregory's Redonda Formation skull (which was termed the holotype) and Savage's Travesser Formation skull. Redondasaurus bermani was based on Berman's Ghost Ranch skull. It is unclear whether the two species are distinct, their major differences are that R. gregorii has a more narrow snout than R. bermani. These differences may be related to sexual dimorphism, though is difficult to test this idea directly. Alternatively, they may reflect ontogenetic (age-based) changes in form.

=== Other specimens (1993–present) ===
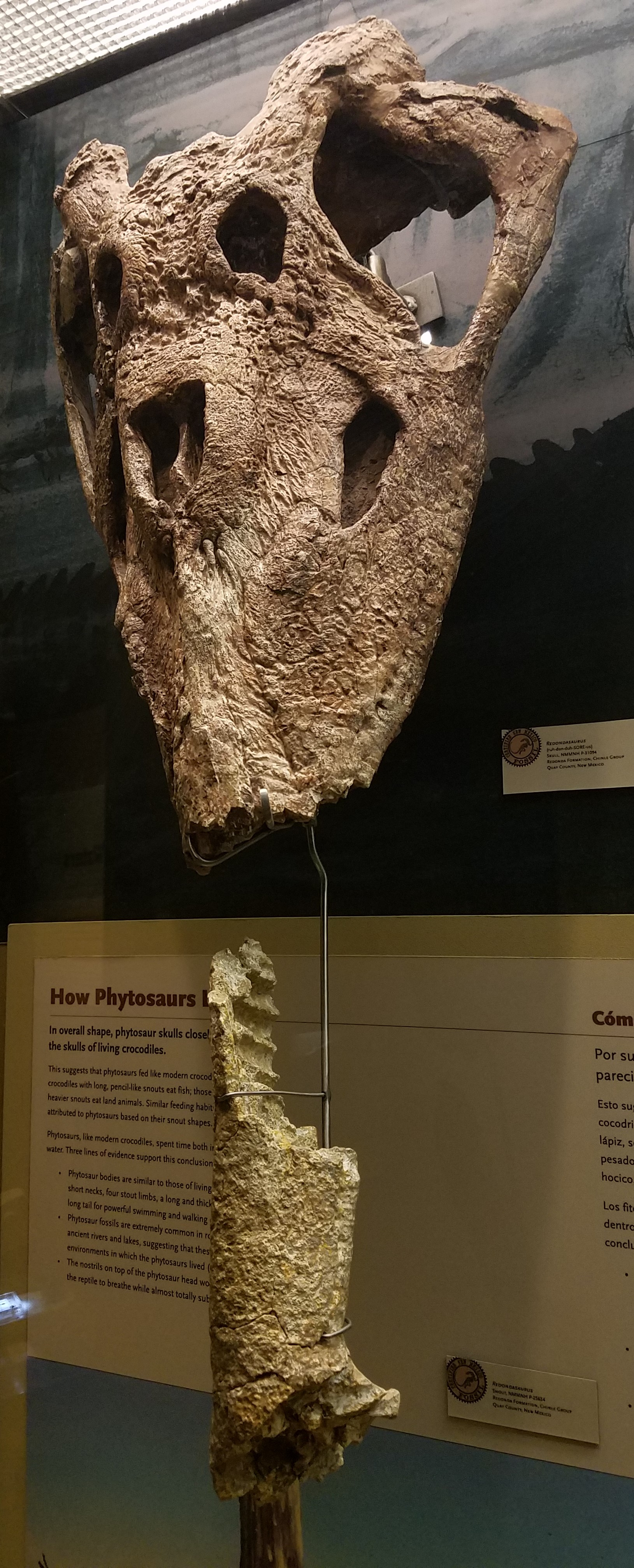
Redondasaurus gregorii specimen NMMNH P-31094

Many additional specimens have been added to Redondasaurus apart from the three originally placed in the genus in 1993. The first report from outside New Mexico, a skull impression (MNA V3498) from the Wingate Sandstone of Utah, was initially described by Morales & Ash (1993). Several skulls from the Bull Canyon Formation of Texas were mentioned in a Master's thesis by Chavez (2010).

A juvenile skull of R. gregorii (NMMNH P-44920) was first mentioned by Rinehart et al. (2009), described in more detail by Lucas et al. (2013), and redescribed fully by Goldsmith & Stocker (2025). It was collected from the Coelophysis Quarry, a site which had previously only produced the holotype of R. bermani. Heckert et al. (2001) identified a massive flattened skull (NMMNH P-31094) from the Redonda Formation.

All specimens referred to Redondasaurus up until that point were discussed and redescribed by Spielmann & Lucas (2012). Several of the fossils were newly reported. The two most well-preserved skulls are from the Redonda Formation (an adult, NMMNH P-4983, and a juvenile, NMMNH P-31095). The oldest Redondasaurus specimen is an incomplete skull (UCMP V78034/119436) from the Petrified Forest Member (Chinle Formation) of Rio Arriba County, New Mexico. The authors also described a plethora of phytosaur postcranial bones from the Redonda Formation. The large sample of approximately 13 Redondasaurus gregorii skulls have helped to reconstruct growth series and sexual dimorphism trends in the species.

Additional juvenile material was described by Goldsmith & Stocker (2025), including a nearly complete skull (AMNH FR 32182) and part of a snout (CMNH 51002). Redondasaurus has the best sample of juvenile specimens (and thus the best-known growth series) of all phytosaurs, helping to demonstrate how changes in skull structure are reflected both through evolution and individual development.

== Description ==
Redondasaurus, like other phytosaurs, had a very long snout. Known skull lengths range from 22 cm (0.72 ft) in juveniles to 120.5 cm (3.95 ft) in very large adults, suggesting total lengths up to 6.4 m (21 ft). The teeth of Redondasaurus have a columnar enamel microstructure while lines of arrested growth are rare. These characteristics are shared with other phytosaurs from Western North America, contrasting with those from Eastern North America ("Rutiodon").

=== Differences between species ===
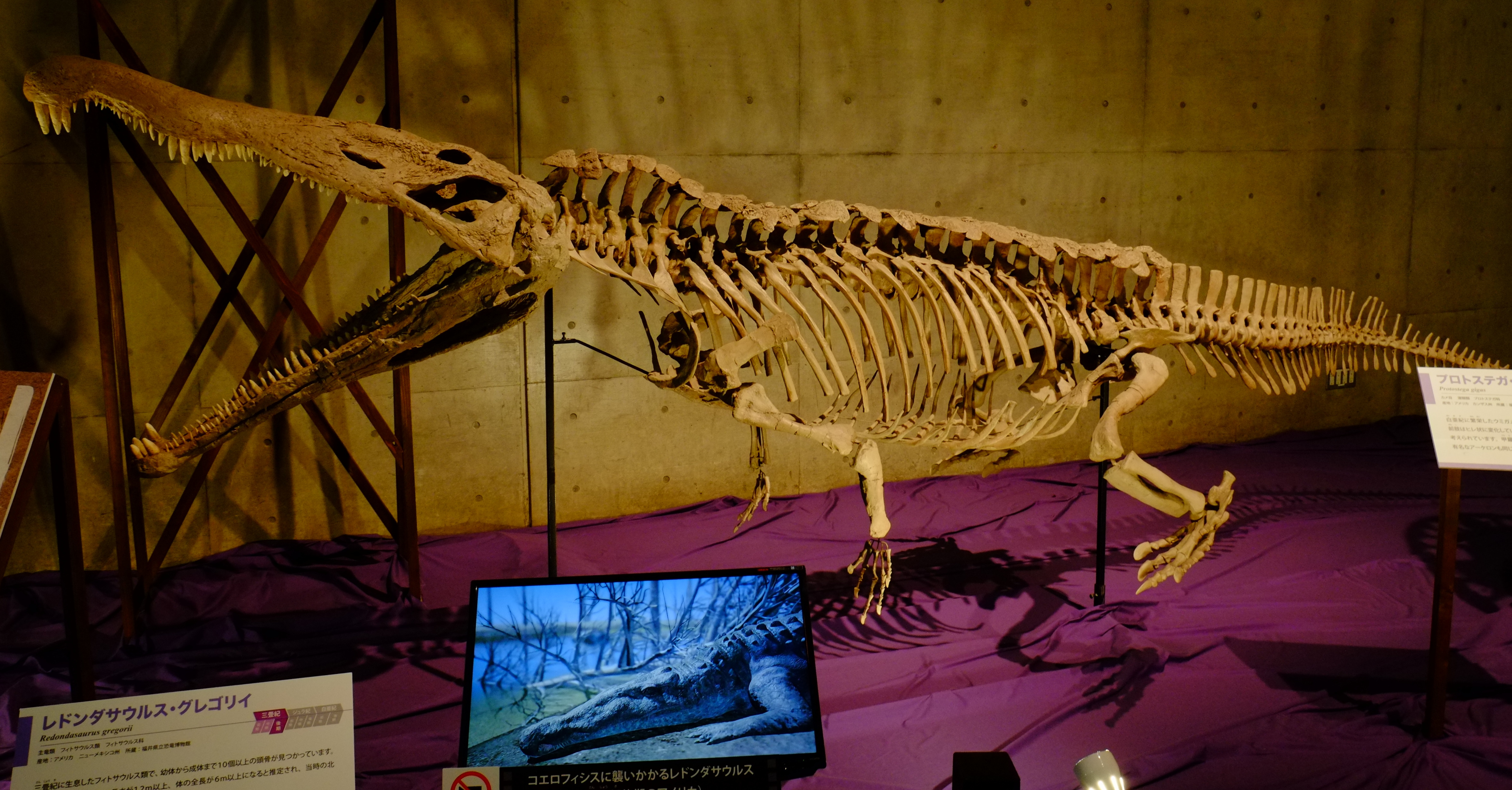
Skeletal mount of R. gregorii

R. gregorii is distinguished by the lack of a rostral crest. Complete skulls of this species are uncommon, but some fragmentary narrow-snouted phytosaur specimens from the Redonda Formation may be part of the taxon.

R. bermani is distinguished by the presence of a partial crest on the rostrum. Only one skull of this species has been found, but Hunt and Lucas postulate that "by analogy with other phytosaurs, it is likely that this crested species was sub-equal in abundance with [R. gregorii].".

=== Diagnostic features ===
The diagnostic criteria given in 1993 for the new genus was as follows:

"Phytosaurid that differs from other genera in possessing supratemporal fenestrae that are essentially concealed in dorsal view and whose anterior margin only slightly emarginates the skull roof and has wide squamosal-postorbital bars."

Hunt and Lucas also extended Colbert and Gregory's analysis that Redondasaurus was the most derived North American phytosaurs, as:

"Phytosaurs show an evolutionary trend to displace ventrally the posterior portion of the midline of the skull roof. Redondasaurus represents the most advanced development of this character."

Additional diagnostic criteria were introduced in 2012 by J. Spielmann and S.G. Lucas. These include:

1. Reduced antorbital fenestra
2. A prominent pre-infratemporal shelf
3. A septomaxilla forming the anterolateral half of the external naris
4. Thickened rim of the orbit
5. Inflated posterior part of nasal
6. Thickened dorsal osteoderms

== Classification ==
Historically, studies of Redondasaurus have been hampered by small number of specimens available, of which only four skulls were recognized in literature. More recently, several Norian-Rhaetian phytosaur skulls have been referred to Redondasaurus. These new specimens encompass a range of sizes from hatchlings to adults and possibly include the first evidence of sexual dimorphism in the taxon. Sexual dimorphism within Redondasaurus was also hypothesized by J. Spielman and S.G. Lucas on May 11, 2012, at the 64th Annual Meeting of the Geological Society of America.

=== Validity ===
Disagreement on the validity of Redondasaurus emerged in 1995, when Long and Murry did not accept it and referred to the specimen as Pseudopalatus pristinus instead. The reason for this may have been that the type specimen of Redondasaurus is missing the entire narial area, left side of its snout, the anterior two thirds of the right premaxilla, and most of its palate. In addition to this, the term used by Savage to describe the first specimen found in 1939, Machaeroprosopus, continues to be used by some scholars in place of Redondasaurus as the genus name. Hungerbühler et al. argued in 2013 that Redondasaurus should be regarded as a junior synonym of Machaeroprosopus because:

1. Upon a comparison of cranial characters, Machaeroprosopus lottorum is found to bridge the morphological gap between Redondasaurus and Machaeroprosopus in such a way that the distinction becomes arbitrary.
2. According to cladistic analysis, it is unlikely that Redondasaurus is in a basal position compared to other North American pseudopalatine phytosaurs.
3. For R. gregorii and R. bermani to be sister taxa, three additional steps would be necessary for forming a phylogenetic tree. This is the case even if the rostral crest, used by Lucas and Hunt to differentiate R. gregorii and R. bermani, is ignored in the analysis.

== Paleoecology ==
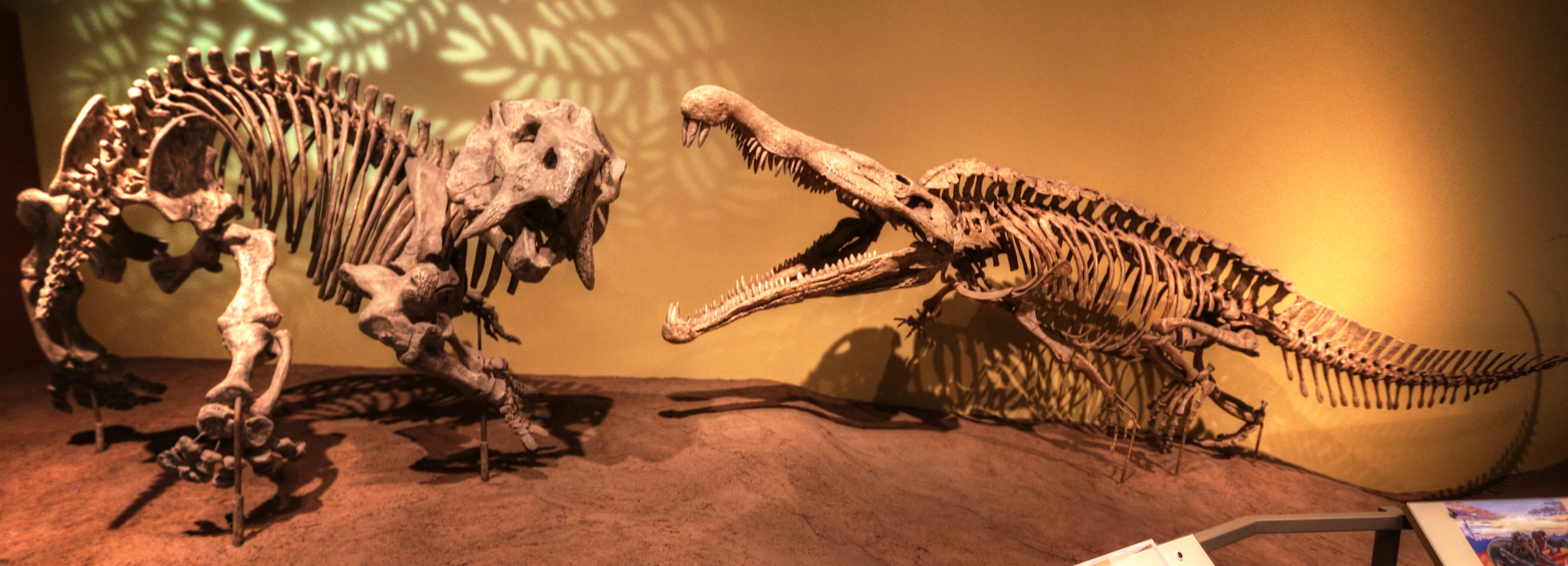
Placerias and Redondasaurus skeletal mounts, New Mexico Museum of Natural History and Science

The Chinle Group, where a large portion of Redondasaurus skulls have been found, is composed of fluvial and lacustrine sediments. Accumulations of fossils in the Chinle Formation can be found in floodplains, bogs, ponds, and fluvial channels. Additional paleontological and sedimentary evidence support the hypothesis that the climate of the Chinle was strongly influenced by high levels of precipitation.

Most Redondasaurus fossils have been collected from north-central and eastern New Mexico, with a few other occurrences in Texas and Utah. The Chinle Group is particularly important to paleontologists interested in aetosaurs, as it has been critical in establishing their biochronology in the Late Triassic.

Redondasaurus is important because it serves as an index species for the Apachean Land Vertebrate Faunachron (LVF). Indeed, it is considered a true index fossil because Redondasaurus is temporally restricted and easily identified. The biostratigraphic importance of the genus was reaffirmed when it was determined that the beginning of the Apachean was lower than previously concluded. Rather than at the base of the Redonda Formation, the Apachean appears high in the Bull Canyon Formation. Correlating the vertebrate stratigraphy of Redondasaurus has also allowed for the correlation of Redonda locally within the southwestern USA. Given the recent acquisition of additional diagnostic characteristics, and the increase in number of Redondasaurus skulls recognized in literature, it is likely that the use of the genus as an index fossil will expand to other deposits and even globally.
