= Kenneth M. Baird =

Canadian physicist (1923–2022)

Kenneth MacClure Baird
- Kenneth MacClure Baird
- Born: January 23, 1923; Hwaikingfu, Henan, China
- Died: April 18, 2022 (aged 99); Ottawa, Canada
- Citizenship: Canadian
- Education: University of New Brunswick, Bristol University, England
- Scientific career
- Fields: Physics

Kenneth MacClure Baird (January 23, 1923 – April 18, 2022) was a Canadian physicist, metrologist and inventor, born of Canadian parents in China in 1923.

== Biography ==
Baird received his Bachelor of Science in physics at the University of New Brunswick, Canada in 1943, and joined the Canadian National Research Council (NRC) in Ottawa where he excelled at research in aerial reconnaissance and high speed photography. In 1946 he created a camera which could snap 800,000 pictures a second.

His success earned him full NRC financial support for graduate studies at Bristol University, England, where he acquired his Ph.D. in solid state physics in 1952. He is the younger brother to Dr. David Baird.

Returning to the NRC, Baird headed the transition of Canada’s primary length standard/facilities of the International Metre from a prototype metal bar (the official international standard of length established in 1779) to a wavelength of light. His contribution to the development of isotope lamps, on perturbations to wavelength standards, and in interferometry (including the development of the world’s first interference comparator for metre bar calibration in terms of standard wavelengths) placed Canada among the main contributors to the redefinition of the International Metre in 1960.

Baird also maintained Canada’s primary standard of mass as well as length, and standards for quantities derived from them, such as density, pressure, vacuum and certain engineering standards. For much of this work Baird engaged the industrial community, producing results such as the first commercially produced internal reflector laser, manufactured by E. Leitz Company. In 1973, Baird and his colleagues invented an important interference device designed for the security of valuable documents, subsequently used on Canadian monetary bills thus establishing a new standard for currency anti-counterfeiting.

Baird and his colleagues worked to improve the accuracy of measurements of the speed of light, which ultimately provided the solid foundation for redefining the International Metre in 1982 and "their skilled pioneering work in laser frequency stabilization and measurement" which resulted in the following achievements:

- The development of the Iodine-stabilized helium neon laser, and one of the first demonstrations of saturated absorption spectroscopy and widely used realization of the primary standard of length and wavelengths.
- The confirmation of the most recent new values for the speed of light, 100 times more accurate than previous measurements (The 7th International Conference on Quantum Electronics, Montreal, 1972).
- The development of the technique of transition–difference generated frequencies in spectroscopic wavelength and frequency measurements.
- The first measurement of the frequency of visible light, in collaboration with the US National Bureau of Standards.

Baird held five patents, and has over fifty scientific and technical papers published in the fields of high-speed and aerial photography, interferometry, lasers and metrology, establishing him as one of North America’s foremost metrologists, and giving Canada a great reputation in this field. As an invited guest, he has spoken at the Gaithersburg Conferences on Precision Measurements and Fundamental Constants in 1970 and 1981; the Fifth International Conference on Laser Spectroscopy at the U.R.S.I. Commission (Washington, DC); the Third Symposium on Frequency Standards and Metrology (France); the Royal Society Meeting on New Techniques in Optical and Infrared Spectroscopy (London); and the NATO Advanced Study Institute on Quantum Metrology (Italy).

Baird was an active member of the Optical Society of America, of which he was a fellow and member/chairman of several technical groups and policy committees. He was a member of its board of directors, vice president and president in 1983. In 1989, he was awarded its C.E.K. Mees Medal "in recognition of his contributions to standards research and optical metrology and of his service to the International Commission for Optics and the Optical Society of America."

Baird was also a member of the Canadian Association of Physicists and chairman of its Optical Physics Division; president of the International Commission of Optics (IUPAP – a Division of UNESCO); a member of the International Astronomical Union (IAU) and chairman of its working group on wavelength standards; a member of the International Advisory Committee for the Definition of the Metre and steering committee chairman for the redefinition of the metre in 1982, as well as serving on advisory boards for several optical journals.

After retirement from the NRC in 1982, he was a visiting fellow at the Joint Institute of Laboratory Astrophysics (University of Colorado) and in 1983 a visiting scientist at the Commonwealth Scientific and Industrial Research Organization in Sydney, Australia.

While studying at the University of Bristol, England, Baird met his Swiss wife of 60 years, Erna Jaggi Baird, who died June 6, 2011, of a rare autoimmune disease:

In 2015, Baird was the eldest recipient to be named a Member of the Order of Canada.

Baird died in Ottawa on April 18, 2022, at the age of 99.

== See also ==
- Optical Society of America Past Presidents
