= Apatopus =

Trace fossil classification
- Domain: Eukaryota
- Kingdom: Animalia
- Phylum: Chordata
- Class: Reptilia
- Clade: Archosauromorpha
- Clade: Archosauriformes
- Order: †Phytosauria
- Ichnofamily: †Aptopodidae
- Ichnogenus: †Apatopus; Baird, 1957

Type ichnospecies
- †Apatopus lineatus Baird, 1957

Synonyms
- Otozoum (?) lineatus Bock, 1952

Trace fossil

Apatopus is an ichnogenus, or a name based on footprints, that may have been from a phytosaur. The trackmaker lived in the early Triassic. It was named by Baird in 1957.

Of special relevance in regard to its phytosaurian identity is the fact that the tracks are positioned in a way that indicates that the limbs were held directly under the body, a gait known in true archosaurs like crocodiles and dinosaurs but previously thought absent in phytosaurs. This raises the question of whereas this trait was shared by the last common ancestor between archosaurs and phytosaurs or if it evolved independently between these groups.
