= Benkersandstein Formation =

Geologic formation in Germany

- Stratigraphic range: Carnian; ~235–222 Ma
- Type: Formation
- Unit of: Keuper Group

Lithology
- Primary: Sandstone

Location
- Coordinates: 49.9°N 11.6°E
- Approximate paleocoordinates: 22.7°N 16.0°E
- Region: Bavaria
- Country: Germany
- Benkersandstein Formation (Germany) Benkersandstein Formation (Bavaria)

The Benkersandstein (German for Benker Sandstone) is a geologic formation in Germany. It preserves fossils dating back to the Late Triassic (Carnian) period. Fossil theropod tracks have been reported from the formation.

== Fossil content ==
- Temnospondyls
  - Capitosaurus arenaceus
- Ichnofossils
  - Chirotherium storetonense
  - Coelurosaurichnus schlehenbergensis

== See also ==
- List of fossiliferous stratigraphic units in Germany
- List of dinosaur-bearing rock formations
  - List of stratigraphic units with theropod tracks
- Ansbachersandstein, contemporaneous ichnofossiliferous formation of Bavaria
- Chañares Formation, fossiliferous formation of the Ischigualasto-Villa Unión Basin, Argentina
- Candelária Formation, contemporaneous fossiliferous formation of the Paraná Basin, Brazil
- Molteno Formation, contemporaneous fossiliferous formation of Lesotho and South Africa
- Pebbly Arkose Formation, contemporaneous fossiliferous formation of Botswana, Zambia and Zimbabwe
- Denmark Hill Insect Bed, contemporaneous fossiliferous unit of Queensland, Australia
- Madygen Formation, contemporaneous Lagerstätte of Kyrgyzstan
