= David McCurdy Baird =

Canadian photographer and geologist (1920–2019)

- Born: July 28, 1920; Fredericton, New Brunswick, Canada
- Died: September 10, 2019 (aged 99)
- Education: University of New Brunswick; University of Rochester; McGill University
- Scientific career
- Fields: Geology

David McCurdy Baird OC FRSC (July 28, 1920 – September 10, 2019) was a Canadian geologist, photographer, and academic. He was the older brother of Dr. Kenneth Baird.

== Early life and education ==
Baird was born in Fredericton, New Brunswick in July 1920. He received a Bachelor of Science degree in 1941 from the University of New Brunswick, a Master of Science degree in 1943 from the University of Rochester, and a Ph.D. in 1947 from McGill University.

== Career and later life ==
Baird held many university teaching positions including the University of Rochester (1941 to 1943), McGill University (1943 to 1946), Mount Allison University (1946 to 1947), and the University of New Brunswick (1947 to 1952). From 1952 to 1958, he was a Provincial Geologist for the Province of Newfoundland and Labrador. At the same time, he was a Professor of Geology at Memorial University of Newfoundland and was head of the department from 1954 to 1958. In 1958, he joined the University of Ottawa as a Professor of Geology and Chairman of the Department where he would remain until 1966.

From 1966 to 1981, he was the founding Director of the Canada Science and Technology Museum in Ottawa. From 1981 to 1986, he was the founding Director of the Royal Tyrrell Museum of Palaeontology in Drumheller, Alberta. In 1986, he was appointed Director of the Rideau Canal Museum in Smiths Falls, Ontario.

He was the author of numerous books including Beauty in the Rocks: The Photography of David M. Baird (2006, ISBN 1-894898-37-0), Northern Lights: Lighthouses of Canada (1999, ISBN 1-894073-09-6), Jasper National Park: Behind the mountains and glaciers (1977, ISBN 0-88830-130-8), A guide to geology for visitors to Canada's national parks (ISBN 0770510108), and Our Earth in Continuous Change (1973, ISBN 0-07-077394-7).

In 1986, he was made an Officer of the Order of Canada for his "life-long contribution to science education in Canada". In 1986, he was awarded the Royal Canadian Geographical Society's Massey Medal. In 1958, he was made a Fellow of the Royal Society of Canada and was awarded the Society's Bancroft Award in 1970. He died in September 2019 at the age of 99.
