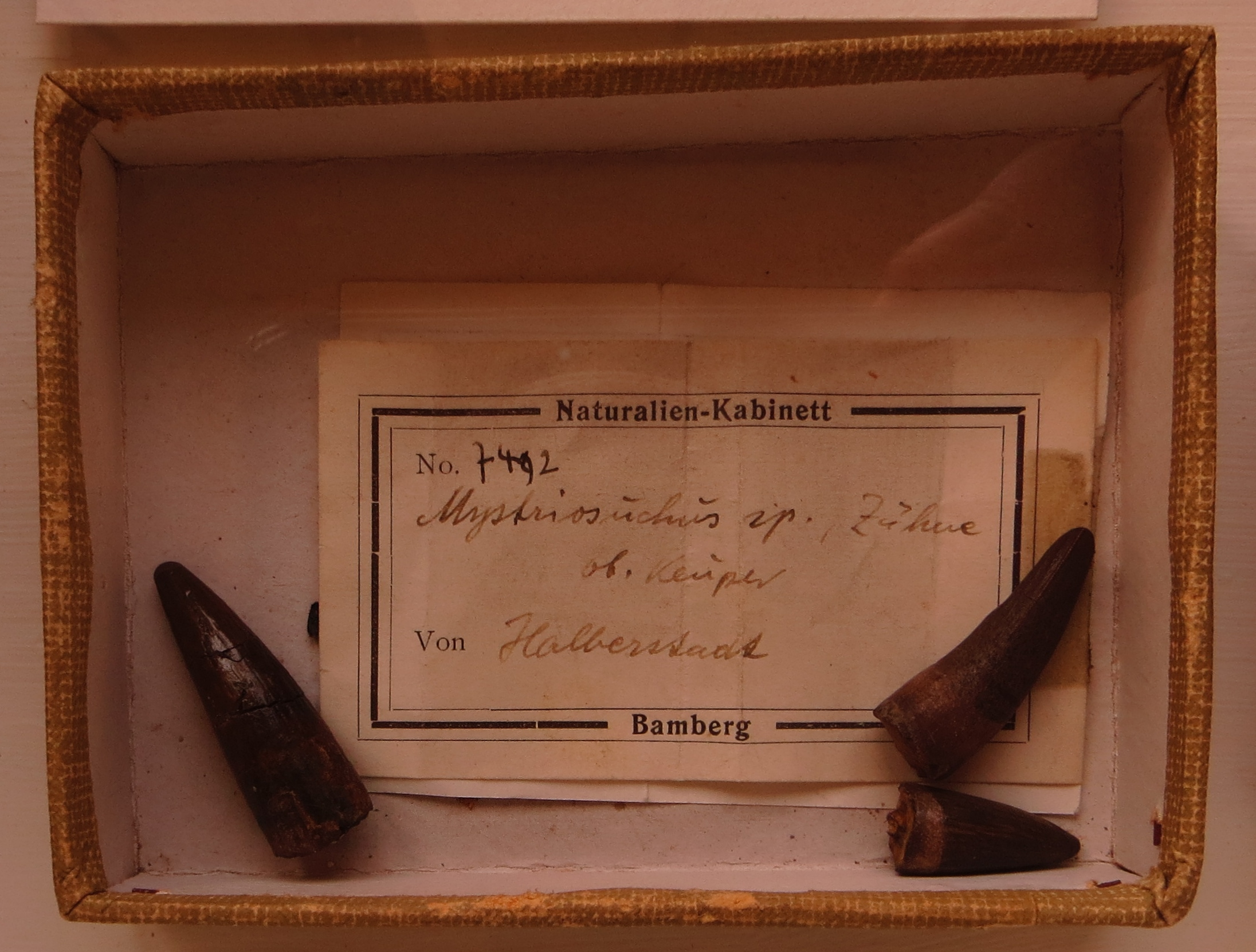

Scientific classification
- Kingdom: Animalia
- Phylum: Chordata
- Class: Reptilia
- Order: †Phytosauria
- Family: †Parasuchidae
- Genus: †Belodon von Meyer, 1844

Type species
- †Belodon plieningeri von Meyer, 1844

Other species
- Belodon lepturus Cope, 1870; Belodon scolopax Cope, 1881; Belodon validus Marsh, 1893

Synonyms
- Belodon kapffi von Meyer, 1861 (now Nicrosaurus)

= Belodon =

Belodon Temporal range: Triassic, 205.6–201.6 Ma

Extinct genus of reptiles

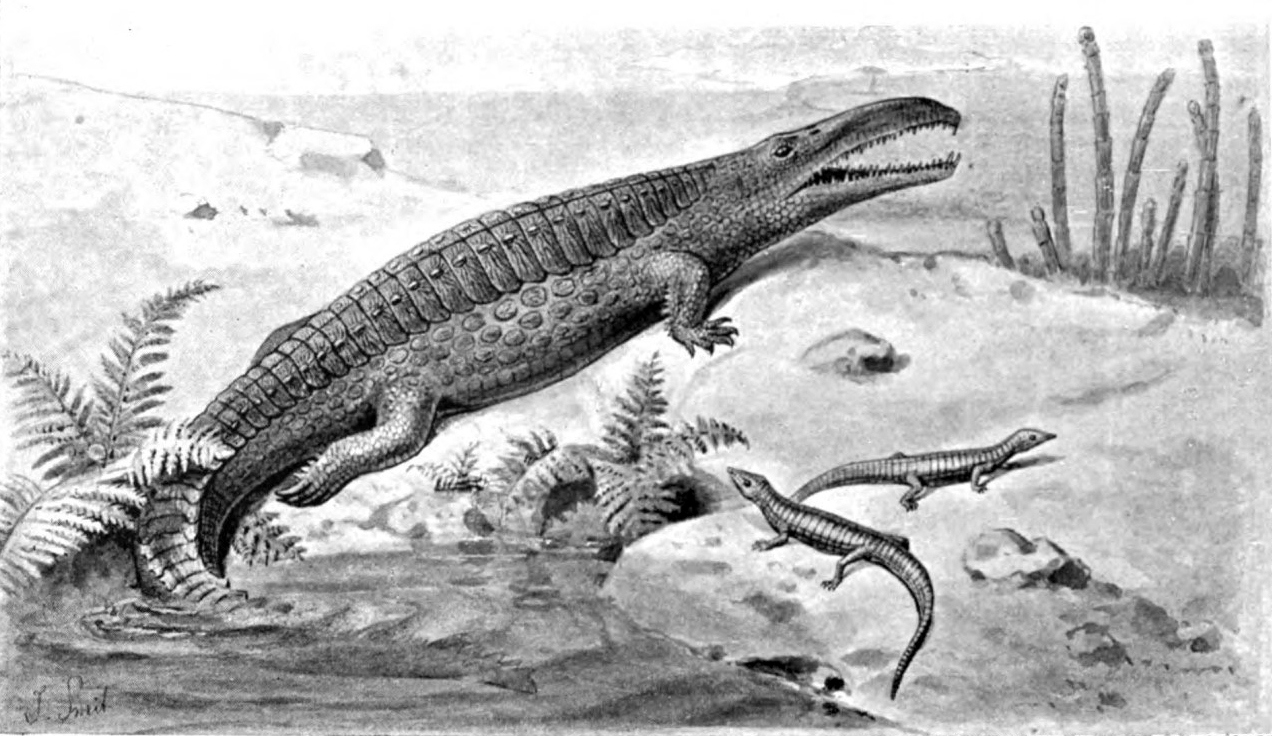
An outdated reconstruction of Belodon and Aetosaurus. The skull of Belodon is based on Nicrosaurus kapffi, and the carapace on Paratypothorax

Belodon (meaning "arrow tooth") is a dubious genus of phytosaur, a crocodile-like reptile that lived during the Triassic. Its fossils have been found in Europe, North America, and India. The type species, Belodon plieningeri, was named by prolific German paleontologist Christian Erich Hermann von Meyer in 1844. Its type specimen is based on several teeth.

Many other species were also named, among them Belodon buceros (named by Edward Drinker Cope in 1881), Belodon kapffi (von Meyer, 1861), Belodon lepturus (Cope, 1870), Belodon priscus (originally described as Compsosaurus priscus by Joseph Leidy in 1856), Belodon scolopax (Cope, 1881), and Belodon validus (Othniel Charles Marsh, 1893). It is now known that phytosaur teeth aren't of taxonomic utility, and thus, Belodon is an invalid species, with several of the specimens referred to it now considered either Mystriosuchus, Machaeroprosopus, or Nicrosaurus.
