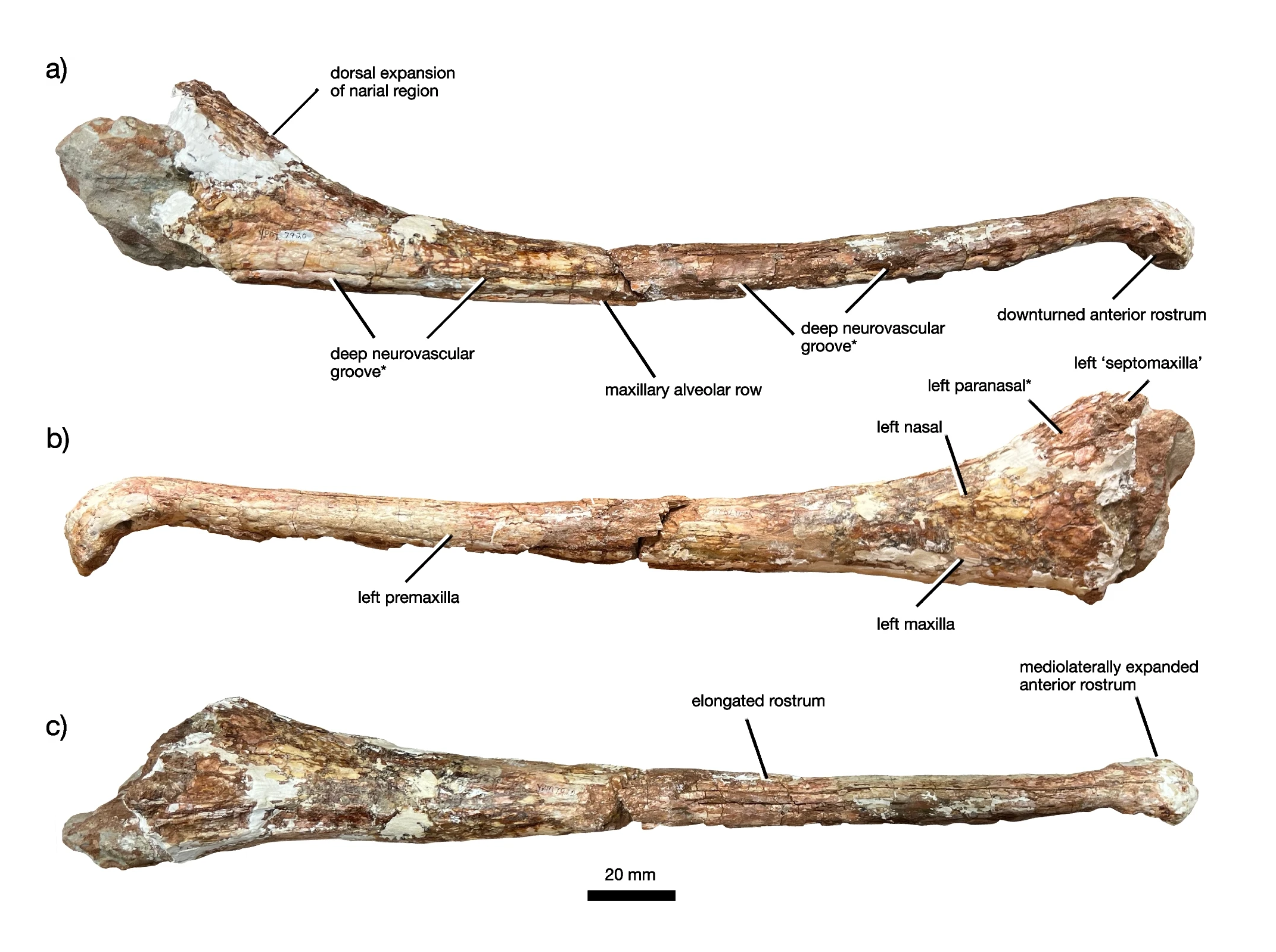
- Holotype skull
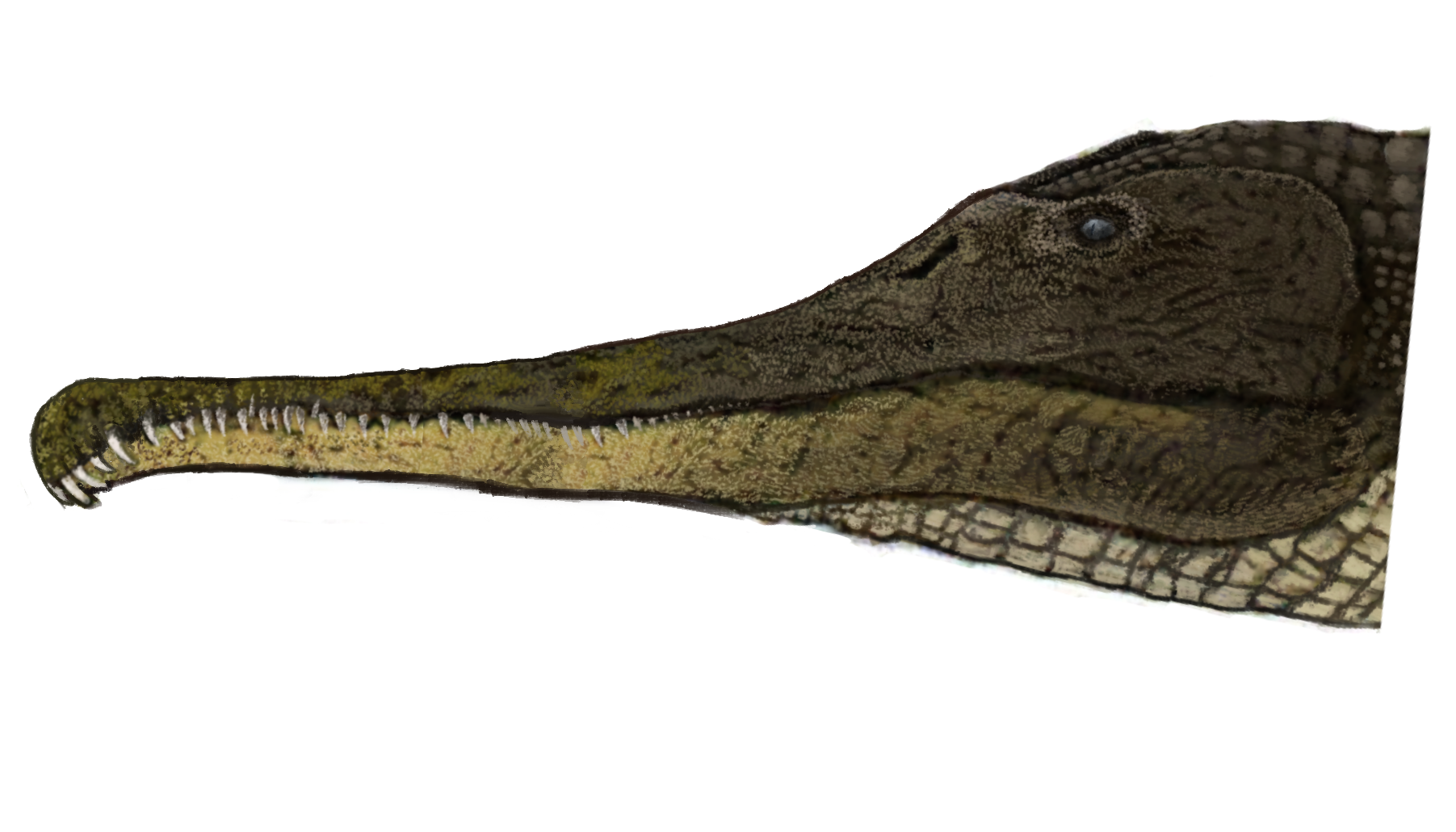
- Life Restoration

Scientific classification
- Kingdom: Animalia
- Phylum: Chordata
- Class: Reptilia
- Order: †Phytosauria
- Family: †Parasuchidae
- Subfamily: †Mystriosuchinae
- Genus: †Jupijkam; Brownstein, 2023

Type species
- Jupijkam paleofluvialis Brownstein, 2023

= Jupijkam =

Jupijkam Temporal range: Late Triassic Norian–Rhaetian

Genus of reptile

Jupijkam is an extinct genus of phytosaur from the Late Triassic of Nova Scotia, Canada. The genus is monotypic, including only the species Jupijkam paleofluvialis. It is based on a partial skull and a few other fragments (including an osteoderm) from the White Water Member of the Blomidon Formation. Along with unnamed fossils from the Fleming Fjord Formation of Greenland, these remains represent the northernmost record of phytosaurs. Jupijkam is named after Jipijka'm, the great horned serpent of Mi'kmaq mythology.

Fossils of Jupijkam were previously referred to Rutiodon, and most phylogenetic analyses retain Jupijkam as a Rutiodon-grade phytosaur (i.e., a non-leptosuchomorph mystriosuchine). Most Rutiodon-grade phytosaurs were extinct prior to the late Norian, but Jupijkam survived up to the latest Norian or early Rhaetian.

== History and naming ==
Jupijkam is known from a singular, only partially preserved skull as well as a complete osteoderm and various bone fragments, all of which had been discovered in 1974. The fossils of the genus stem from the White Water Member of the Blomidon Formation and were excavated in what is now Nova Scotia, Canada. This not only makes Jupijkam one of the northernmost phytosaurs, but also one of the youngest, as these rocks date to the Late Triassic (Norian to Rhaetian). After being found near the Bay of Fundy, the material was stabilized with the use of white plaster, which did not alter the shape of the fossil, before being acquired by the Yale Peabody Museum. The fossil material wasn't described until 2023, when C. D. Brownstein named the genus and species.

The genus name Jupijkam is derived from the horned serpent of Mi’kmaq mythology, which is also known as Jipijka’m, Chepechcalm and Tcipitckaam. The name was chosen as the Mi'kmaq are the original inhabitants of Nova Scotia. The species name derives from Latin words "palaeo" and "fluvialis", meaning "ancient" and "river" respectively, chosen to reflect the animal's likely habitat.

== Description ==
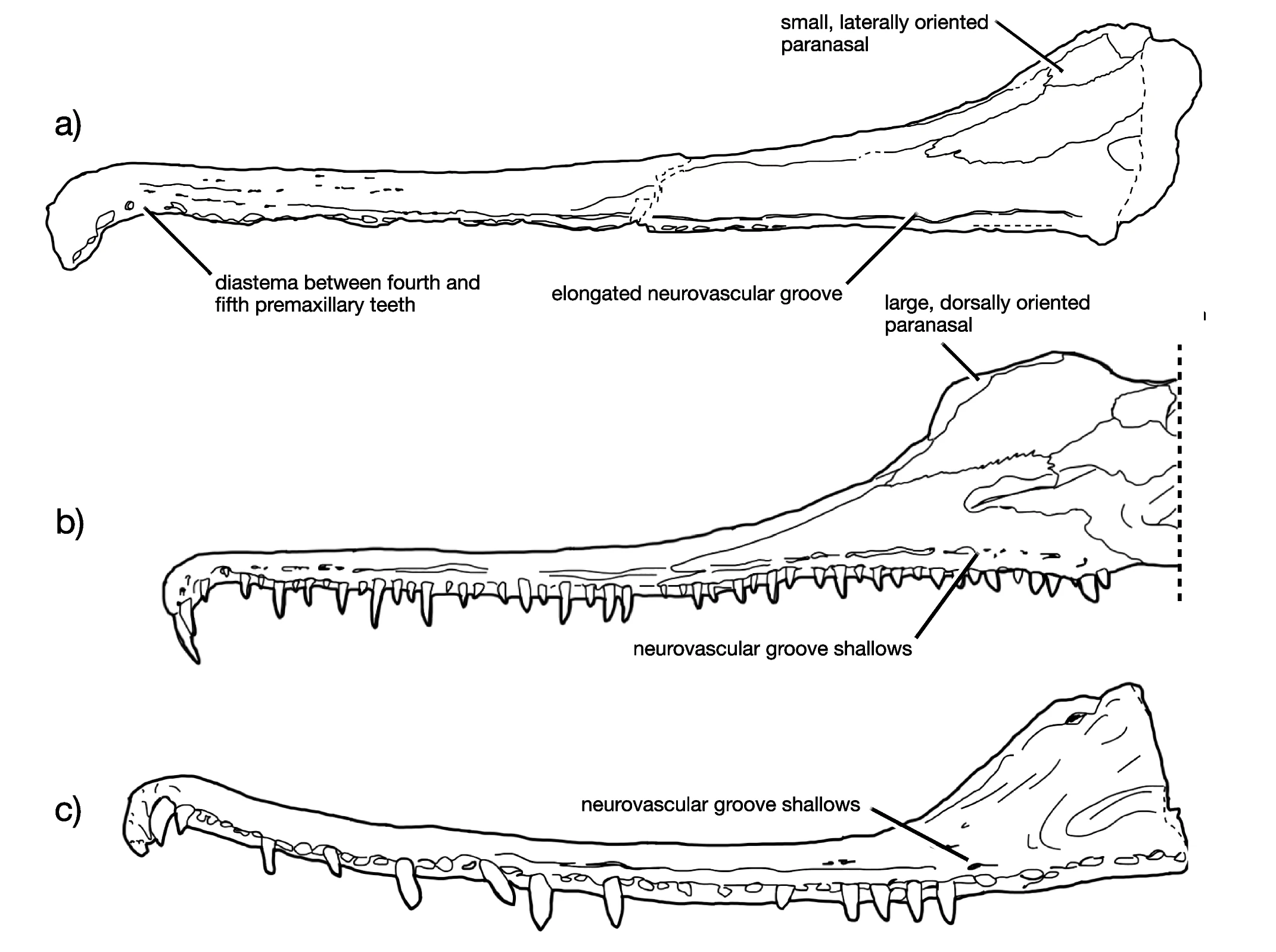
Comparison between Jupijkam (a), Rutiodon carolinensis (b), and Machaeroprosopus lottorum (c)

Jupijkam was a large-bodied phytosaur with an extremely elongated (longirostrine) and gracile snout. Brownstein compares the proportions of this animal to phytosaurs like Rutiodon and Machaeroprosopus lottorum among others, contrasting with the much more robust morphology seen in Pravusuchus, Colossosuchus and other species of Machaeroprosopus. Like in other phytosaurs, the rostrum rises abruptly towards the back of the skull, elevating the nostrils high above the jawline just before the eyes. However, little can be said about the precise anatomy of Jupijkam beyond the jaws, as the back of the skull is not preserved.

The jaws end in a rosette of teeth formed by the premaxillae, with four teeth present in either side. This rosette is only moderately downturned, which makes it similar to most other phytosaurs and differentiates it from Machaeroprosopus and Colossosuchus. The fourth tooth, like in other parasuchids, is noticeably smaller than the first three and separated by all other subsequent premaxillary teeth by a short, toothless gap (diastema). Behind this diastema, each premaxilla bears 19 additional teeth, each of which is more widely spaced from the others than typical for longirostrine phytosaurs. On the side of the premaxillae, about 5 mm (0.20 in) above the toothrow, lies a deep groove that contains the neurovascular foramina. This groove is much deeper than in other taxa and runs along nearly the entire length of the rostrum, only ending just behind the beginning of the antorbital fenestra.

The rostrum as a whole lacks extensive ornamentation or ridges except for the occasional foramina. This lack of ornamentation also extends to the septomaxillae, which aren't strongly arched either. A pair of thick bones located before and towards the sides of the nares which seem to match the paranasals seen in several species of Machaeroprosopus. Such bones are not known from all phytosaurs and their relationship to the skull bones of other archosaurs remains unclear. Unlike in Machaeroprosopus, the potential paranasals of Jupijkam are directed much more towards the side of the skull rather than upwards. The nasal bones are not inflated.

== Phylogeny ==
Given the contentious state of phytosaur phylogenetics, two different data sets were utilized in the description of Jupijkam. Said datasets were modified versions of Jones & Butler (2018) and Datta and Ray (2023). Following Jones and Butler, Jupijkam was recovered as a parasuchid phytosaur in a large polytomy alongside Colossosuchus, Angistorhinus, the clade formed by Volcanosuchus and Rutiodon as well as Leptosuchomorpha. Utilizing the Datta and Ray dataset, Jupijkam was found to fall into the aforementioned clade formed by Rutiodon and Volcanosuchus. This means that both parsimony analysis found Jupijkam as a mystriosuchine outside of Leptosuchomorpha.

- - Diandongosuchus
  - Parasuchidae
    - Arganarhinus
    - - - Wannia
        - Parasuchus
      - - Paleorhinus
        - Mystriosuchinae
          - Colossosuchus
          - Jupijkam paleofluvialis
          - Angistorhinus
          - - Rutiodon
            - Volcanosuchus
          - Leptosuchomorpha

- - Diandongosuchus
  - Parasuchidae
    - Wannia
    - Parasuchus bransoni
    - Ebrachosuchus
    - - Parasuchus hislopi
      - Parasuchus angustifrons
    - Mystriosuchinae
      - - Brachysuchus
        - Angistorhinus
      - - - Colossosuchus
          - ISIR276 Indian phytosaur sp. 1
          - ISIR276 Indian phytosaur sp. 2
        - - - Rutiodon
            - Volcanosuchus
            - Jupijkam paleofluvialis
          - Leptosuchomorpha

Bayesian analysis meanwhile found very different results for both datasets. Utilizing Bayesian tip-dating analysis of the Jones and Butler dataset, Jupijkam was recovered as a sister taxon to Mystriosuchus, whereas Bayesian tip-dating analysis of the Datta and Ray dataset was more in line with the previous parsimony analysis, finding it to group with Rutiodon, except now to the exclusion of Volcanosuchus.

- - Diandongosuchus
  - - - Paleorhinus
      - - Ebrachosuchus
        - - Wannia
          - Parasuchus
    - - Arganarhinus
      - - - Angistorhinus
          - - Rutiodon
            - Volcanosuchus
        - - Colossosuchus
          - - - - "Machaeroprosopus" zunii
                - Smilosuchus
              - - Leptosuchus
                - - Pravusuchus
                  - - "Smilosuchus" lithodendrorum
                    - - Coburgosuchus
                      - Nicrosaurus
            - - - Jupijkam paleofluvialis
                - Mystriosuchus
              - - Protome
                - Machaeroprosopus (including Redondasaurus)

- - Diandongosuchus
  - - - Ebrachosuchus
      - - - Parasuchus angustifrons
          - Parasuchus hislopi
        - - Parasuchus bransoni
          - Wannia
    - - - Colossosuchus
        - - ISIR276 Indian phytosaur sp. 1
          - ISIR271 Indian phytosaur sp. 2
      - - Volcanosuchus
        - - - Angistorhinus
            - Brachysuchus
          - - - Jupijkam paleofluvialis
              - Rutiodon
            - Leptosuchomorpha

While all these analyses produce different results, it has been noted that in no analysis does it clade with the other known Late Triassic phytosaurs. This would suggest that Jupijkam represents a lineage that independently survived until the Norian-Rhaetian boundary.
