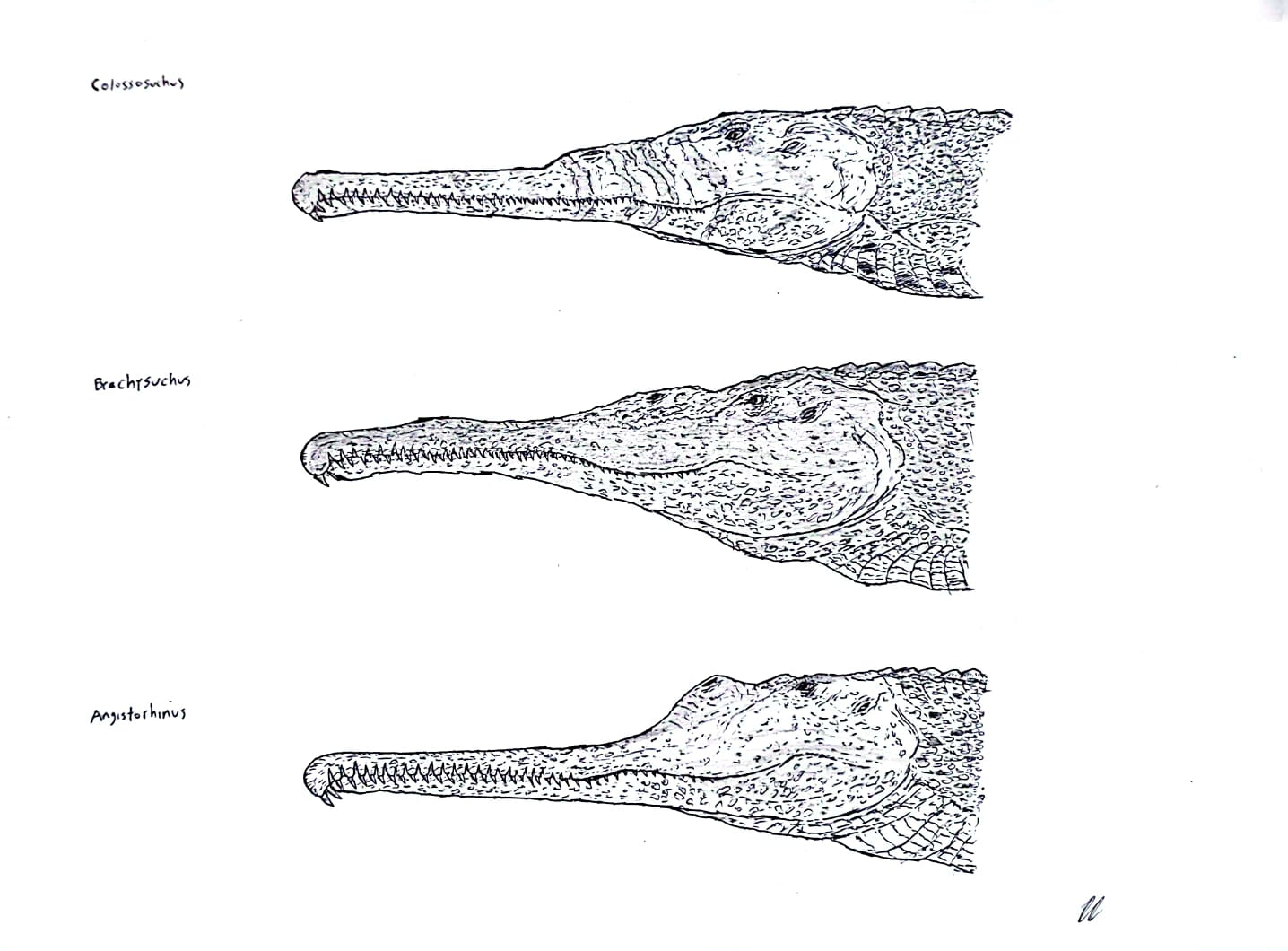
- Colossosuchus techniensis (top) compared to other phytosaurs

Scientific classification
- Kingdom: Animalia
- Phylum: Chordata
- Class: Reptilia
- Order: †Phytosauria
- Family: †Parasuchidae
- Subfamily: †Mystriosuchinae
- Genus: †Colossosuchus; Datta & Ray, 2023
- Species: †C. techniensis

Binomial name
- †Colossosuchus techniensis Datta & Ray, 2023

= Colossosuchus =

Colossosuchus Temporal range: Upper Triassic

Genus of reptile

Colossosuchus is an extinct genus of large mystriosuchine phytosaur from the Upper Triassic Tiki Formation of India. It was among the largest known phytosaurs, reaching a length of over 8 m (26 ft). Among its characteristic features are the dome-shaped head and downturned tip of the upper jaw. Colossosuchus was part of an endemic radiation of phytosaurs from India, closely related to two additional forms not yet named. The genus is monotypic, only including the species Colossosuchus techniensis.

== History and naming ==
Fossils of Colossosuchus were recovered from the red mudstone of the fluvial Tiki Formation, located within the Rewa Gondwana Basin of India. The remains stem from a monotypic bonebed, meaning the collection of bones stems from only a single species. The bonebed yielded 27 skull and mandible specimens and approximately 339 postcranial remains corresponding to a minimum of 21 individual animals, primarily juveniles and subadults. All specimens are stored at the Indian Institute of Technology in Kharagpur. The type specimen is IITKGPR749, which is a cranium consisting of a partial rostrum, the skull table and the braincase.

The genus name combines the Latin "colossus", a reference to the great size obtained by the animal, with the Greek "souchus" for crocodile, a common suffix used in phytosaurs due to their resemblance to modern crocodiles. The species name " techniensis" honors the Indian Institute of Technology.

== Description ==
Overall, the cranium of Colossosuchus appears dome-shaped when viewed from the side. The tip of the elongated upper jaw, known as the terminal rosette, is strongly turned downward at a 70° angle. The rosette is large and bulbous, with its front flattened and the downward curvature is much steeper than in most other phytosaurs. A series of parallel crests run exclusively along the left side of the premaxilla and maxilla. The nares are located just before the eyes like in other phytosaurs and unlike in crocodiles. Just before the opening of the nares a pair of prenarial fossa are present, which Colossosuchus shares with Diandongosuchus. The naris themselves are not elevated above the eyes, but the septum is located above the rim of the narial openings. This too is similar to Diandongosuchus, as well as Ebrachosuchus and several species of Parasuchus, while setting it apart from most leptosuchomorphs. The nares overlap with the antorbital fenestra for over 50% of their length, a condition also seen in all mystriosuchines other than Volcanosuchus. The nasal bone is covered in band-like ornamentation, which is replaced by dendritic (branched) ornamentation on the skulltable. Where the nasal bone meets the frontal bone a U-shaped depression can be found. The supratemporal fenestra open dorsolaterally, meaning to the top and side of the skull, and are located below the skulltable. The postorbital-squamosal bar is depressed and oriented down and to the sides, while the parietal-squamosal bar is convex and positioned so that it descends beneath the skull table.

The shaft of the mandible is broad, about 59% of the width of the mandibular symphysis.

The dentition consists of three parts and is tripartite, meaning several sets of teeth are present. These consist of the large teeth found in the terminal rosette and the distinct premaxillary and maxillary tooth sets. This sets Colossosuchus apart from other basal mystriosuchines and draws parallels to leptosuchomorphs, the only mystriosuchines besides Colossosuchus to feature tripartite dentition. Four teeth were located on either side of the terminal rosette, the first three of which were large and of roughly equal size. The first two tooth pairs are firmly located at the bottom of the snout tip, while the third and fourth pair originate on the side of the bone and are angled slightly outward. The final pair was smaller and followed by three small anterior premaxillary teeth. In general, Colossosuchus had a very high tooth count, with around 57 teeth being present on either side of the upper jaw.

The neural arches possess well-developed laminae and fossae, which are similar to those seen in Angistorhinus and both Smilosuchus adamanensis as well as Smilosuchus gregorii. The sacrum consists of three vertebrae, like in Smilosuchus adamanensis and Redondasaurus cf. gregorii.

=== Size ===
The body size of Colossosuchus was determined through the use of multiple different methods. According to prior publications, including Heckert et al. (2021), head to body proportions changed among phytosaurs in their evolutionary history. According to them, basal taxa such as Parasuchus had larger heads, with P. hislopi having a head that makes up 21% of the total length. Later phytosaurs are then hypothesized to have had proportions more similar to modern crocodilians like the saltwater crocodile, only accounting for 13-15% of the total length. Based on this Datta and Ray propose that Colossosuchus would have had more derived proportions which, assuming that the skull makes up 13% of the body length, would yield a maximum length of over 9 m (30 ft). To prevent overestimating the size, two additional regression equations were used, one based on the length of the femur and the other based on skull length. The former yielded a maximum length of only 6 m (20 ft), considered to be an underestimate, while the latter resulted in a maximum length of over 8 m (26 ft). The 8 m (26 ft) estimate is favored by Datta and Ray, who argue that it is most in line with the body size seen in other derived phytosaurs including Smilosuchus. This would consequently mean that Colossosuchus was among the largest known phytosaurs discovered.

These estimates, however, only apply to the largest known individuals and do not represent the average size attained by Colossosuchus. The fact that the fossils were discovered in a mass death site instead provides a wide range of sizes for the 21 known individuals, which range from juveniles to fully mature adults. Skeletally immature members of this species are generally smaller than 5 m (16 ft) and characterized by their comparably big eyes, lacking ornamentation, unfused bones and poorly developed muscle scars. Subadults and transitional individuals are thought to occupy a size range between 5–7 m (16–23 ft) while skeletal maturity appears to have been reached at a length greater than 7 m (23 ft).

== Phylogeny ==
The phylogenetic analysis conducted for Colossosuchus was based on a 2021 dataset by author Debajit Data, which included 24 different taxa composed of 23 phytosaurs and Euparkeria as the outgroup. The analysis was built around a total of 106 anatomical characters, most of which regarded the skull, including 11 traits not previously included in analysis. Besides Colossosuchus, two undescribed phytosaur skulls from India were also included (ISIR271 & (ISIR276).

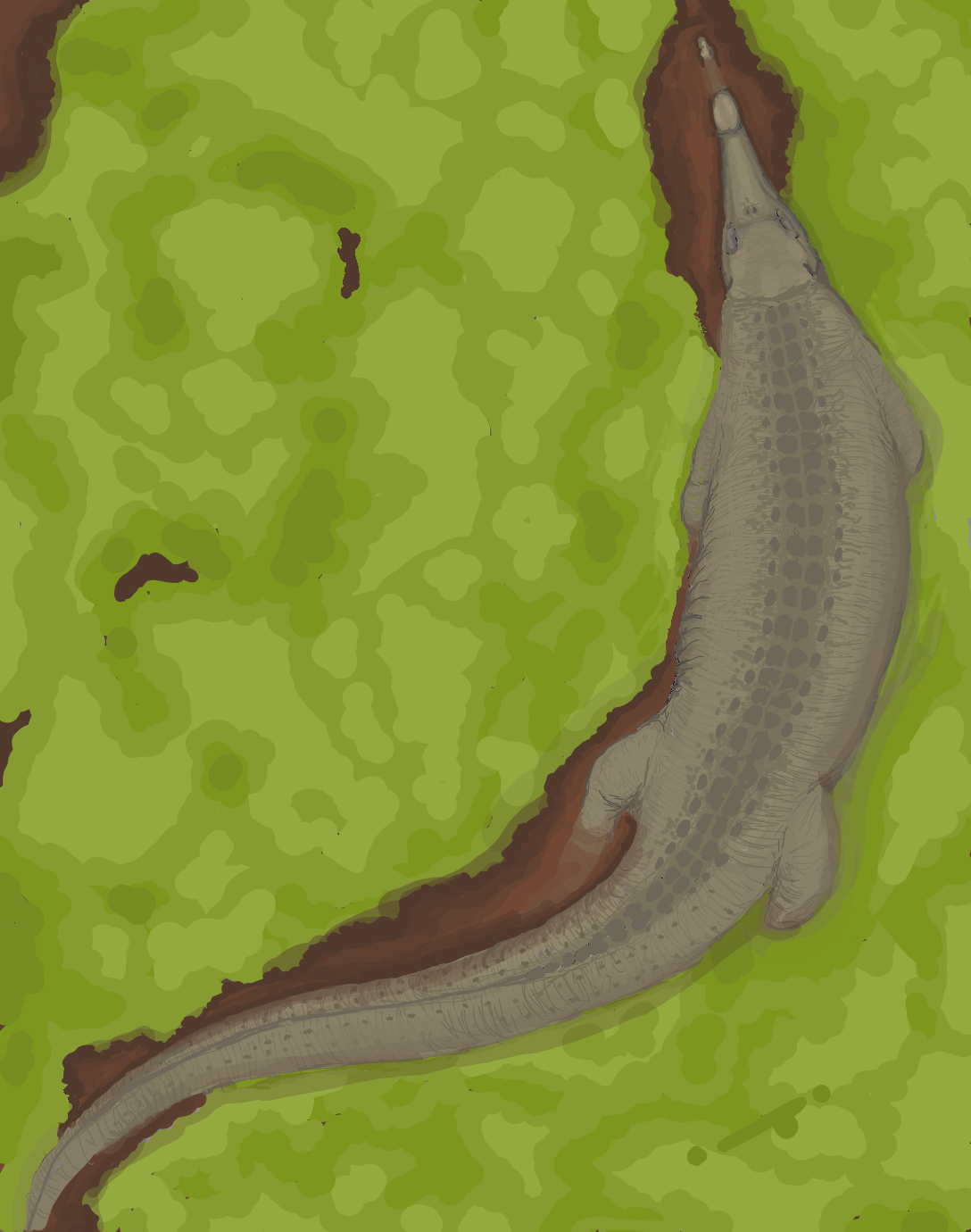
Colossosuchus in a swamp

The strict consensus tree yielded from the analysis was only poorly resolved and features multiple polytomies, yet also displays some much clearer separations. Specifically, members of the Mystriosuchinae are clearly set apart from non-mystriosuchine phytosaurs and within the subfamily, the leptosuchomorphs likewise form a distinct cluster of species. Colossosuchus was found to be a mystriosuchine, forming a distinct clade together with the two undescribed skulls that were included. This grouping sits alongside Volcanosuchus, Rutiodon and the clade formed by Angistorhinus and Brachysuchus at the base of Mystriosuchinae, which further diverges into the also poorly resolved Leptosuchomorpha. Although the information provided by the strict consensus is limited, clearer results were yielded by the tree resulting from the 50% majority rule. This tree agrees with the broader ideas present in the strict consensus, but clears up several of the polytomys present in the former. Specifically, Angistorhinus and Brachysuchus still form a clade, which was found to be the basalmost grouping in Mystriosuchinae. The next diverging group is that of Colossosuchus and the undescribed Indian skulls, of which ISIR271 was found to be the earliest branching of the three. These Indian forms were recovered as sister taxa to a group consisting of the clade formed by Rutiodon and Volcanosuchus and the more derived leptosuchomorphs. The results of the 50% majority rule tree are shown below.

- - Euparkeria capensis
  - Phytosauria
    - Diandongosuchus fuyuanensis
    - Parasuchidae
      - Wannia scurriensis
      - - Parasuchus bransoni
        - - - Parasuchus angustifrons
            - Parasuchus hislopi
          - - Ebrachosuchus neukami
            - Mystriosuchinae
              - - Angistorhinus grandis
                - Brachysuchus megalodon
              - - - ISIR271
                  - - ISIR276
                    - Colossosuchus techniensis
                - - - Volcanosuchus statisticae
                    - Rutiodon carolinensis
                  - Leptosuchomorpha

This general placement was repeated in a second paper from the same year, as Brownstein (2023) likewise recovered Colossosuchus as a mystriosuchine parasuchid. Brownstein conducted multiple phylogenetic analysis utilizing different datasets and both parsimony and Bayesian analysis. While the placement of various taxa shifted among these analysis, Colossosuchus was only marginally affected by the differing sets. Both parsimony and Bayesian analysis using Datta & Rey's dataset still found it to be more basal than Rutiodon and Volcanosuchus (although Brachysuchus and Angistorhinus were found significantly more derived in the Bayesian analysis). The Bayesian analysis using the dataset of Jones & Butler (2018) on the other hand differed in that it placed Colossosuchus as the most derived non-leptosuchomorph parasuchid.

== Paleobiology ==
The Tiki Formation is known for its diversity and abundance of phytosaur remains. Besides Colossosuchus, it also yielded the smaller Volcanosuchus and a large amount of teeth belonging to a derived species of phytosaur. In addition to these remains from the Tiki Formation, at least two more phytosaurs are known to have lived at the same time in different parts of India. This diverse phytosaur fauna highlights the endemic nature of the group, which generally appears through distinct forms inhabiting restricted ranges, rather than individual genera having a cosmopolitan distribution. Additionally, these Indian taxa are all noted to have survived the early Norian extinction event that effectively caused the disappearance of most non-leptosuchomorph phytosaurs on a global scale. However neither the precise causes of this extinction event or why the Indian phytosaur community survived it are understood.

The bonebed that yielded the remains of Colossosuchus may have been formed by the mass death of a family group, consisting of adults performing parental care.
