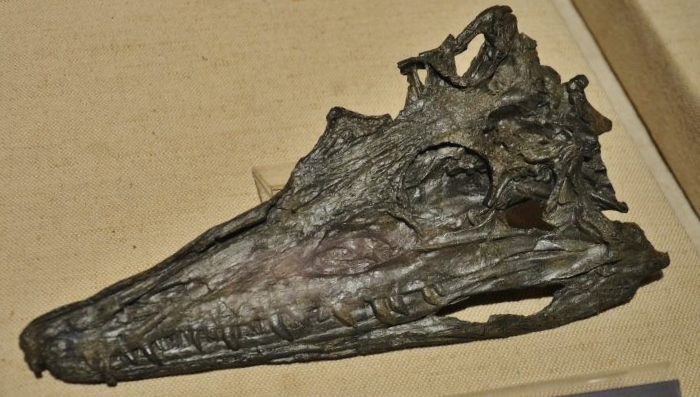
- Skull in Beijing Museum of Natural History
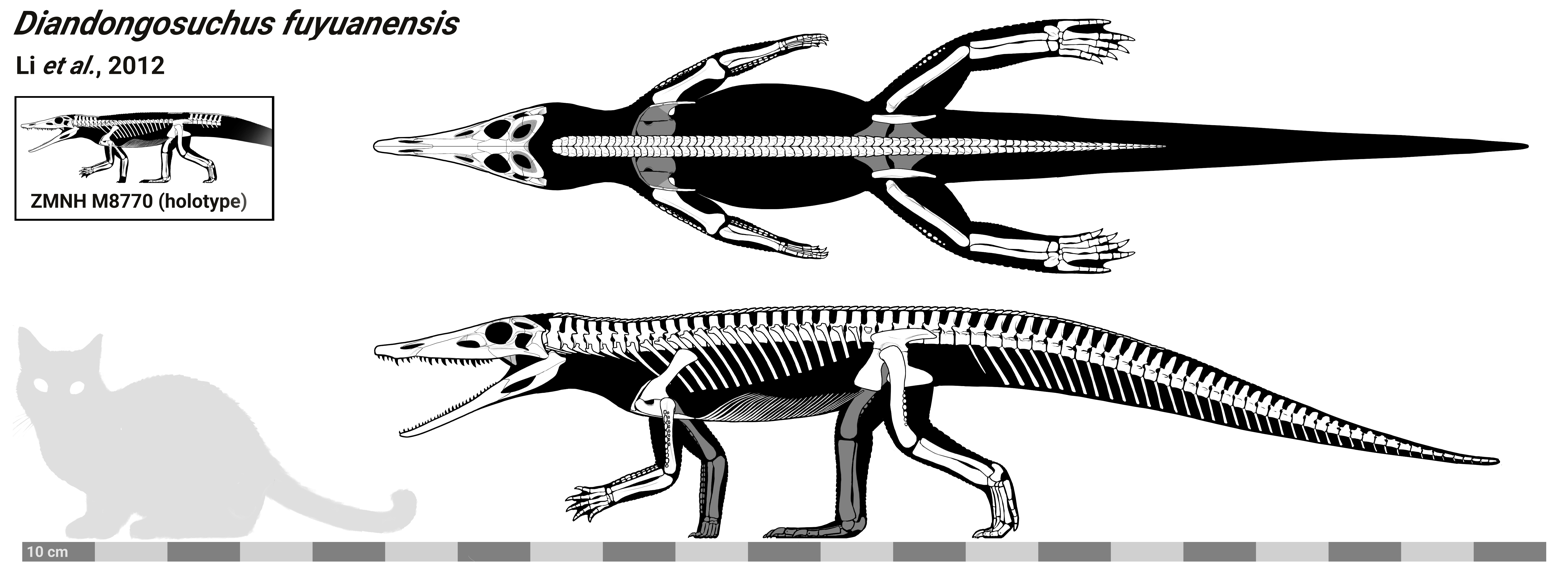
- Skeletal reconstruction and size comparison, in dorsal (top) and lateral (bottom) views

Scientific classification
- Kingdom: Animalia
- Phylum: Chordata
- Order: †Phytosauria
- Genus: †Diandongosuchus; Li et al., 2012

Type species
- †Diandongosuchus fuyuanensis Li et al., 2012

= Diandongosuchus =

Diandongosuchus Temporal range: Middle Triassic 242–237 Ma

Extinct genus of reptiles

Diandongosuchus is an extinct genus of archosauriform reptile, possibly a member of the Phytosauria, known from the Middle Triassic of China. The type species Diandongosuchus fuyuanensis was named in 2012 from the Zhuganpo Formation of Yunnan Province. It is a marine species that shows similarities with another Chinese Triassic species called Qianosuchus mixtus, although it has fewer adaptations toward marine life. It was originally classified as the basal-most member of the pseudosuchian clade Poposauroidea. However, a subsequent study conducted by Stocker et al. (2016, 2017) indicated it to be the basalmost known phytosaur instead.

== Description ==
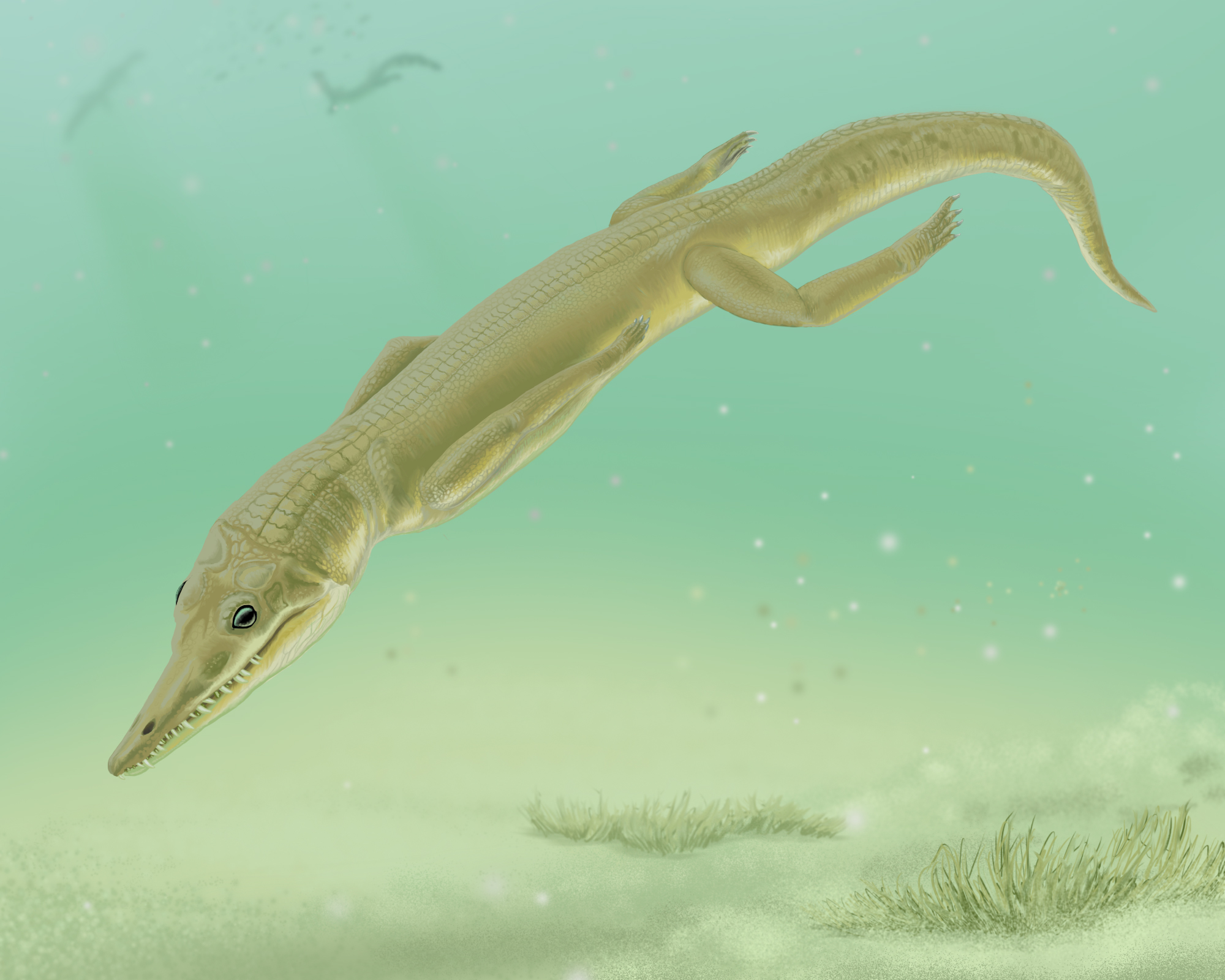
Restoration

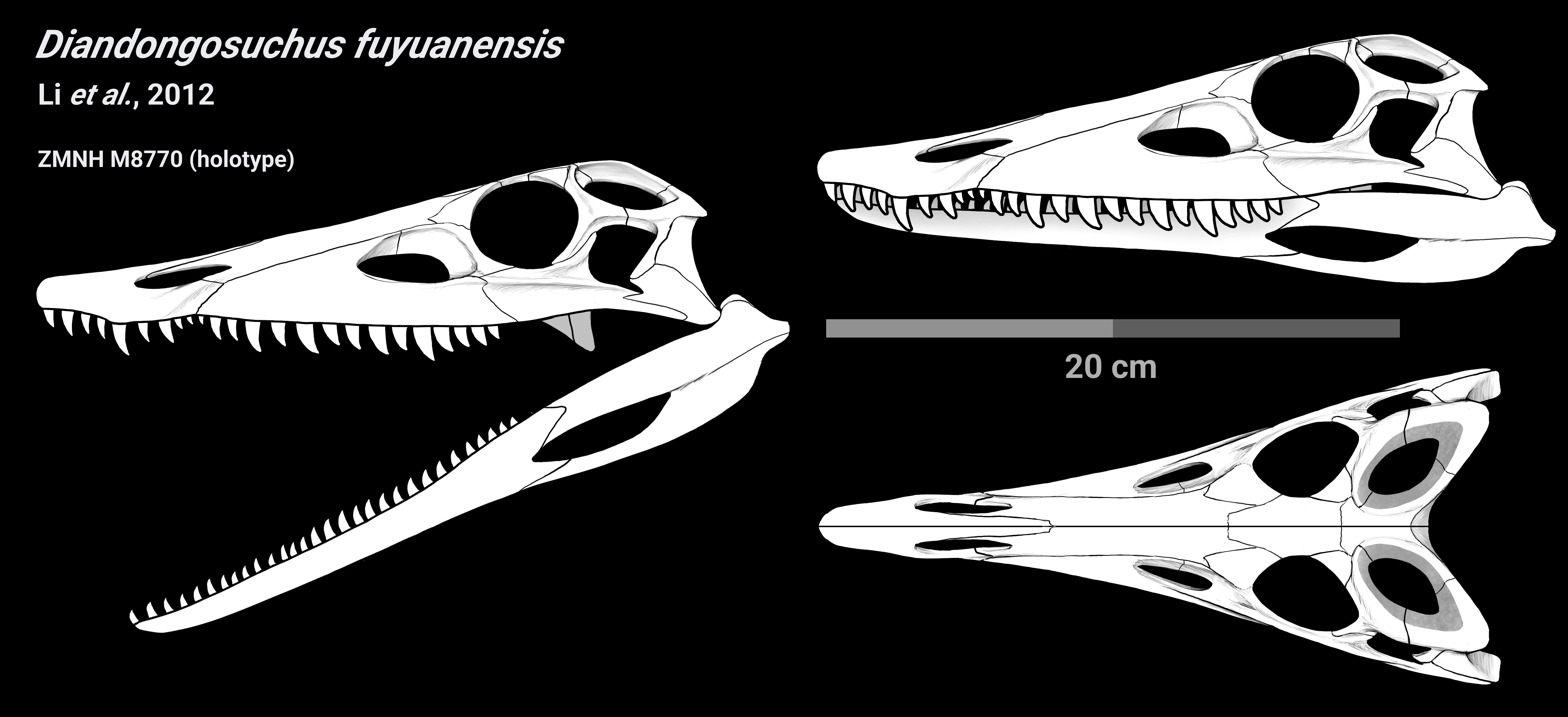
Reconstruction and retro-deformation of the skull

Diandongosuchus is known from a nearly complete articulated skeleton (ZMNH M8770) missing most of the tail. The total length of the specimen is 97 centimetres (3.18 ft) and the estimated body length of the animal in life is around 155 centimetres (5.09 ft). The specimen is preserved on its right side, with the underside of the lower jaws and the trunk showing. It was prepared out of a limestone slab to reveal details on the left side of the skeleton, many of which are better preserved. The skull of Diandongosuchus is proportionally large for its size; it was long and pointed, with oval-shaped eye sockets, antorbital and temporal openings. Distinctive features include a long premaxilla bone bearing 9 teeth at the tip of the snout that extends backward past the nostril openings, a large ridge on the jugal bone that runs beneath the eye socket, and two supratemporal openings on the skull table that have prominent ridges surrounding them.

ZMNH M8770 preserves all 24 presacral vertebrae (9 in the neck and 15 on the back), three sacral vertebrae, and seven of the forward-most tail vertebrae. The neck vertebrae are taller and narrower than they are in Qianosuchus. Most of the back vertebrae are obscured by overlying ribs. At the back of the trunk near the hips are bones belonging to small vertebrates such as fish - likely the stomach contents of the individual. Small overlapping osteoderms (bony scutes) overlay many of the vertebrae. Two rows run along the neck, back, and tail with two pairs of osteoderms overlaying each vertebra. Small osteoderms also would have covered the limbs.

Some features of the limbs, pelvic and pectoral girdles are also diagnostic in Diandongosuchus, including a thick ischium bone in the hip, a large opening of the coracoid bone in the pectoral girdle that is much larger than those of other archosaurs and is closed by the end of the scapula, and a fourth metatarsal bone in the foot that is longer than the other metatarsals. The scapula of Diandongosuchus is longer and narrower than that of Qianosuchus. The iliac blade of the hip is unusual in that it is narrow and projects far back from the rest of the hip. As in Qianosuchus, the femur of Diandongosuchus is slightly twisted, but the fibula is thinner and more curved. The astragalus and calcaneum bones of the ankle fit together like a ball-and-socket.

== Classification ==
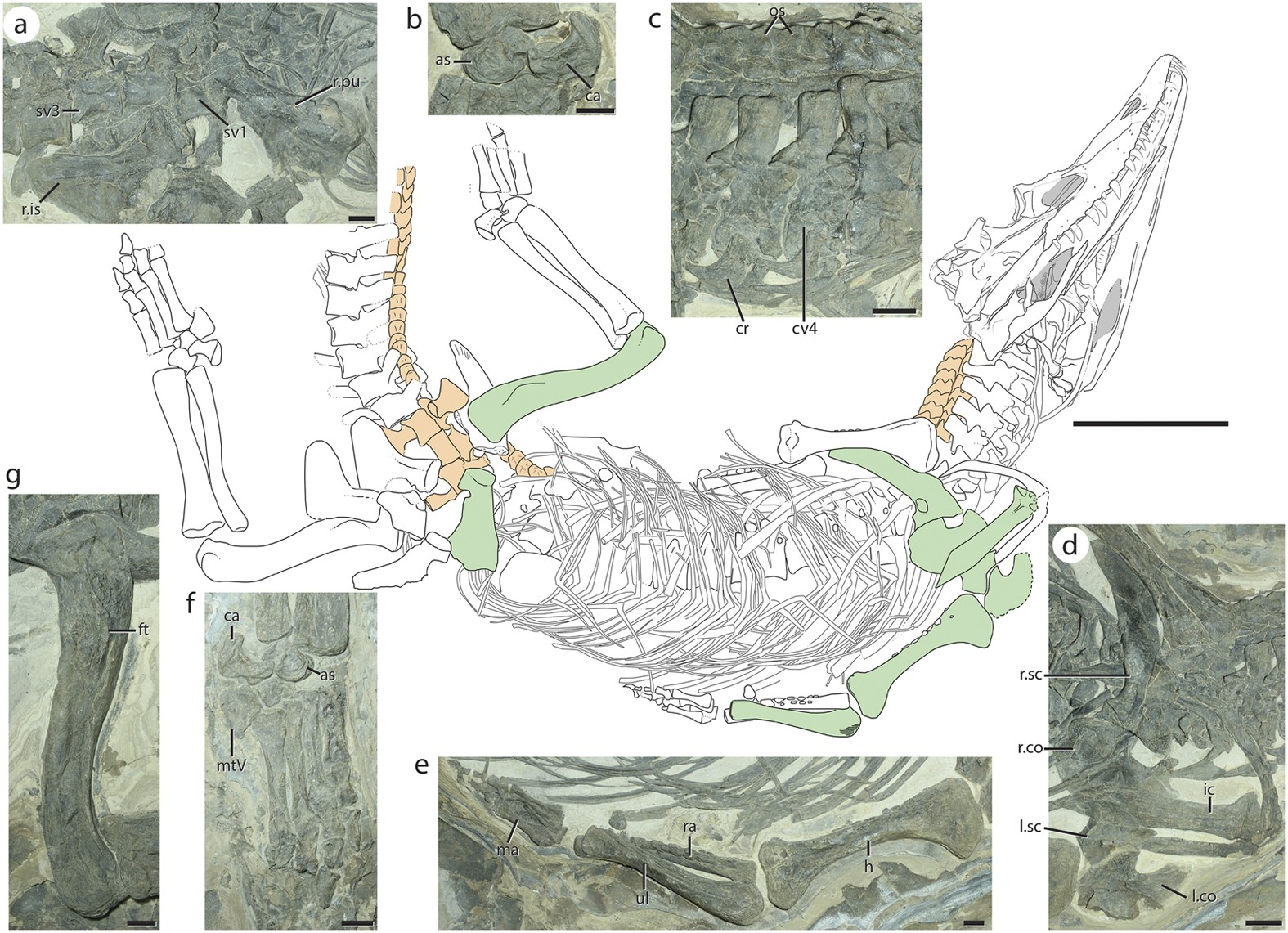
Diagram of the holotype specimen with insert photos showing traits shared with phytosaurs

A phylogenetic analysis conducted by Li et al. (2012) in the original description of Diandongosuchus concluded that it was the most basal member of a clade called Poposauroidea, which includes mostly terrestrial pseudosuchians such as the bipedal Poposaurus and the sail-backed Arizonasaurus. It was compared, and found to be closely related to Qianosuchus, an aquatic pseudosuchian and basal member of Poposauroidea. The data matrix of Li et al., a list of characteristics that was used in the analysis, was based on that of Nesbitt (2011), one of the most extensive on archosaurs.

However, more recent studies have found it to actually be a basal phytosaur, as it showcases several anatomical features on its skeleton that are characteristic of derived, late triassic members of the clade (synamorphies). For example, the overall morphology of the shoulder guirdle is basically identical to that of other phytosaurs, showing this part remained anatomically consistent throughout time. Other certain skull characteristics shared with phytosaurs seem to be associated with strengthening of the skull and its bite, likely an adaptation related to hunting. These include a tight, interdigitating suture between the premaxilla and maxilla (unlike the looser articulation in most other basal archosauriforms), and very similar shapes in the bones of the mandible and jaw joint, which provide a bigger surface area for muscles.

Diandongosuchus is a taxon that provides valuable insight into the evolution of phytosauria, being the earliest known member of the clade, and demonstrating that many anatomical characteristics that define them appeared early in their evolution.

Below is a cladogram resulting from the phylogenetic analysis by Stocker et al. (2017)

- - Litorosuchus
  - - Proterochampsia
    - - Euparkeria
      - - Archosauria
          - Avemetatarsalia
          - Pseudosuchia
            - Ornithosuchidae
            - Suchia
              - Aetosauria
              - Paracrocodylomorpha
                - Loricata
                - Poposauroidea
        - Phytosauria
          - Diandongosuchus
          - Parasuchidae
            - Wannia
            - - Parasuchus
              - - Ebrachosuchus
                - - Angistorhinus
                  - - Rutiodon
                    - - Smilosuchus
                      - Mystriosuchini

== Paleoecology ==
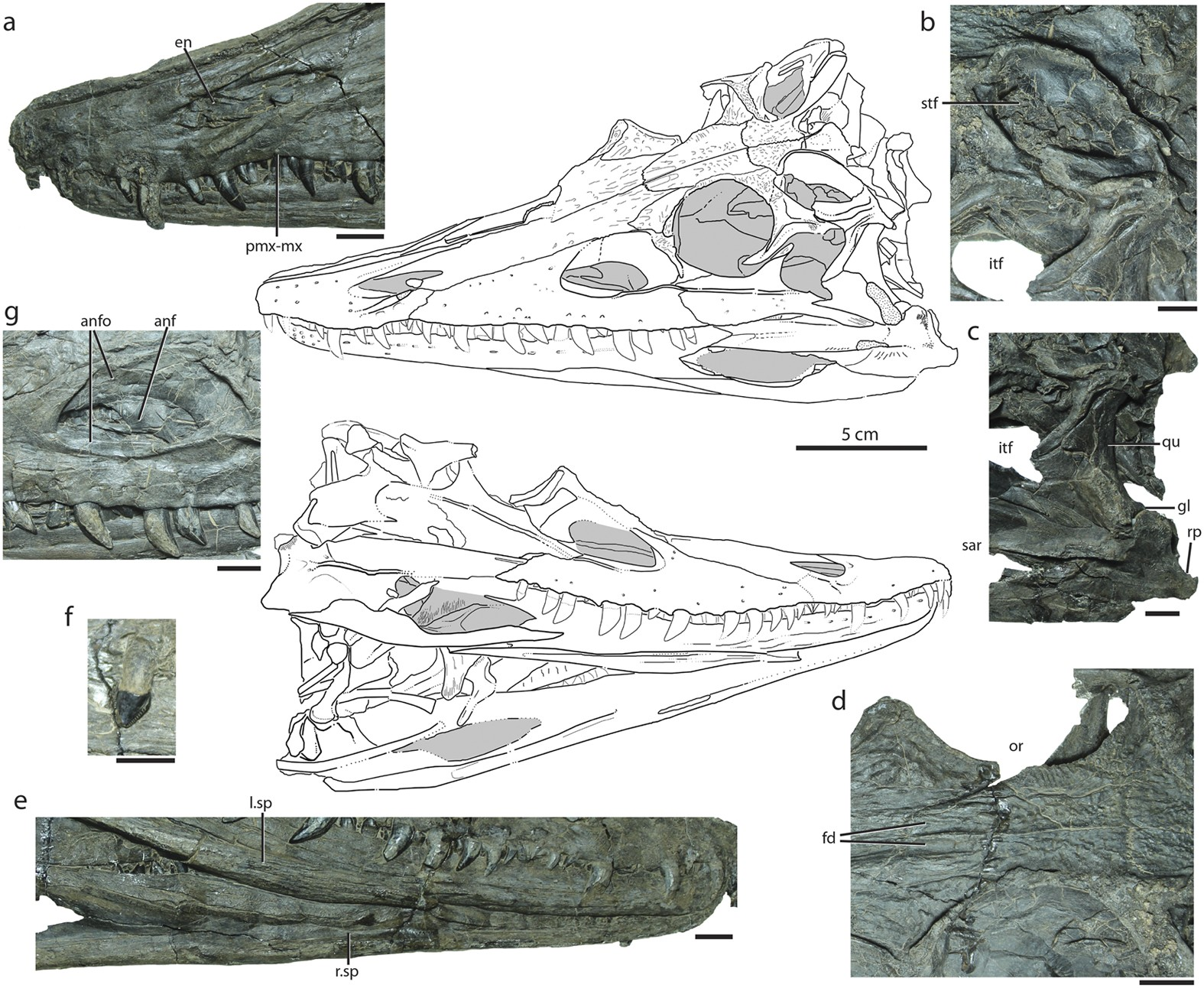
Skull features

Diandongosuchus was found in a Ladinian-age marine limestone formation that has preserved many marine reptiles including thalattosaurs, nothosaurs, pistosaurs, and some protorosaurs. The pseudosuchian Qianosuchus was found in a marine deposit about 50 kilometres (31 mi) northwest of the Diandongosuchus locality that is slightly older (Anisian in age) and possesses many features consistent with a marine lifestyle. However, Diandongosuchus shows no features that are clear adaptations to a marine lifestyle. Possible adaptations include nostrils that are positioned slightly farther back on the skull than most terrestrial pseudosuchians and a greater number of premaxillary teeth (a feature seen in possible semiaquatic archosaurs such as Chanaresuchus and spinosaurids). Fish bones within its stomach contents are additional evidence that it was a marine archosaur. Diandongosuchus may have had a similar lifestyle to modern marine crocodylians like the saltwater crocodile that live along coastlines yet are not fully marine.

The fossil assemblage in which Diandongosuchus was found bears many similarities to that of European fossil localities such as Monte San Giorgio. Both include marine reptiles like thalattosaurs and nothosaurs and probably represented environments along the northern shorelines of the Tethys Ocean. No marine archosaurs like Diandongosuchus and Qianosuchus are known from Europe, although the pseudosuchian Ticinosuchus from Monte San Giorgio was probably adapted to life along the shorelines of the Tethys. In the analyses of Li et al. (2012) and Nesbitt (2011), Ticinosuchus is either the most basal member of a clade called Loricata which is the sister taxon of Poposauroidea, or the sister taxon of Paracrocodylomorpha which includes both Loricata and Poposauroidea.
