= Francosuchus =

Francosuchus Temporal range: Late Triassic, 231–228 Ma

Scientific classification
- Domain: Eukaryota
- Kingdom: Animalia
- Phylum: Chordata
- Class: Reptilia
- Clade: Archosauromorpha
- Clade: Archosauriformes
- Order: †Phytosauria
- Genus: †Francosuchus; Kuhn, 1933

Type species
- †Francosuchus broilii Kuhn, 1933

Species
- †F. broilii Kuhn, 1933; †F. latus Kuhn, 1933

Extinct genus of reptiles

Francosuchus is a dubious genus of probably basal phytosaur known from the Late Triassic (late Carnian stage) of Bavaria, southern Germany. It was named by Oskar Kuhn in 1933 and the type species is Francosuchus broilii. In the same article Kuhn also named a second species Francosuchus latus. Both species were known solely from their holotypes, two partial skulls that were housed at the Bavarian State Collection for Palaeontogy and Geology. Both specimens were collected at Ebrach Quarry, bed number 13 from the late Carnian-aged Blasensandstein Member of the Hassberge Formation. As the holotypes were destroyed during World War II and poorly documented, Francosuchus and its species are usually considered to be nomina dubia.

Kuhn (1936) described and named a third species of this genus, Francosuchus angustifrons, on a basis of another skull from the same quarry, bed number 9. This species was recently reassigned to Paleorhinus, because it shares unique synapomorphies with P. bransoni (the type species of Paleorhinus), and a species-level phylogenetic analysis of phytosaurs found the species to be sister taxa. Friedrich von Huene (1939) described and named a fourth species, Francosuchus trauthi. It was synonymized with Paleorhinus, but a re-description of the species by Butler (2013) found no evidence to support the synonymy, or even a phytosaurian identification. Although it is based solely on a rostrum fragment, "F." trauthi was found to possess a unique combination of characters that distinguish it from all other Triassic tetrapods. Thus it was reassigned to a new genus, Dolerosaurus, referable to Tetrapoda incertae sedis.
