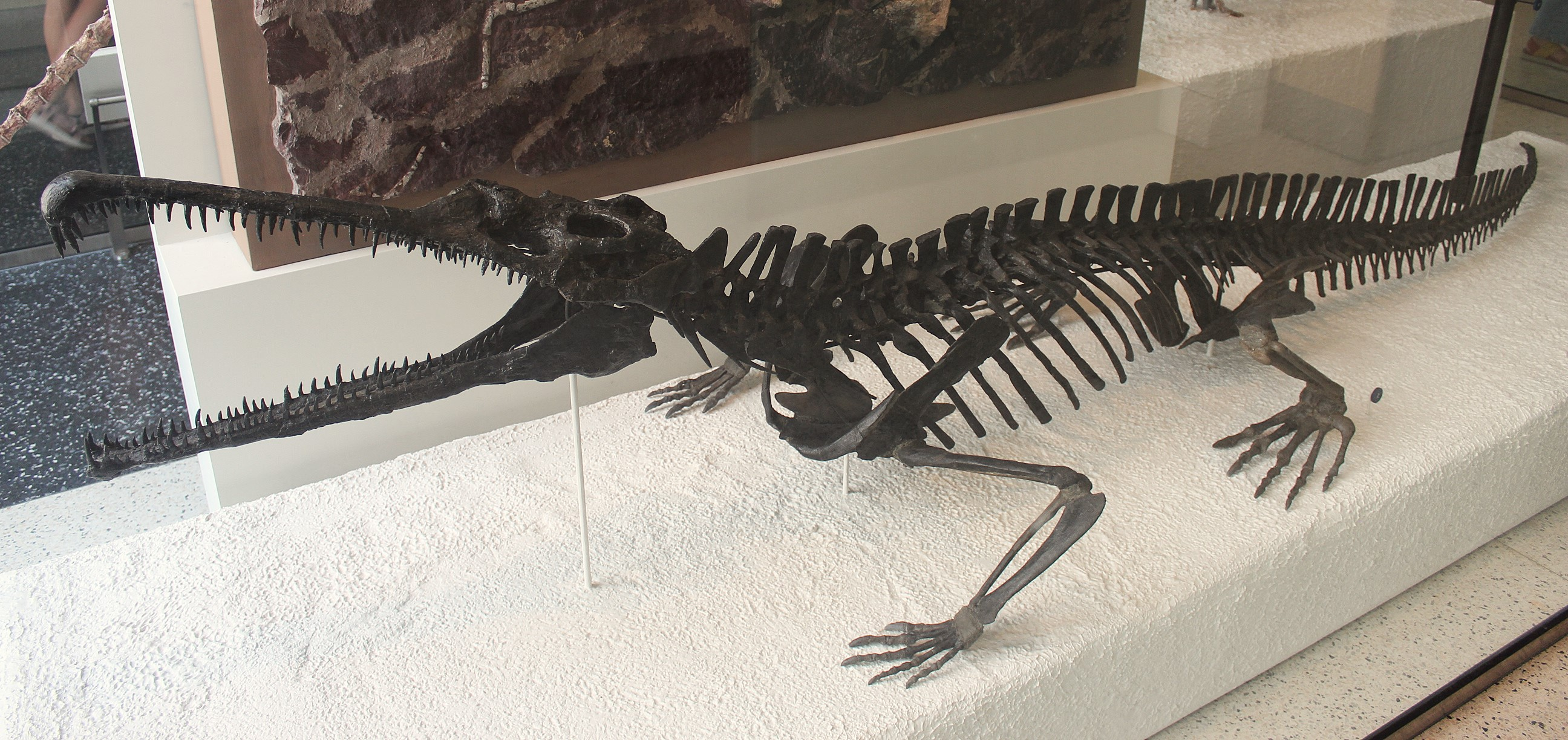
- Skeleton of Rutiodon carolinensis (AMNH 1) in the American Museum of Natural History

Scientific classification
- Kingdom: Animalia
- Phylum: Chordata
- Class: Reptilia
- Order: †Phytosauria
- Family: †Parasuchidae
- Subfamily: †Mystriosuchinae
- Genus: †Rutiodon; Emmons, 1856

Species
- †R. carolinensis (Emmons, 1856) (type); †R. manhattanensis (Huene, 1913)

Synonyms
- Palaeonornis Emmons, 1857

= Rutiodon =

Rutiodon Temporal range: 237–208.5 Ma

Extinct genus of reptiles

Rutiodon (meaning "wrinkle tooth") is an extinct genus of mystriosuchine phytosaurs from the Late Triassic of the eastern United States. The type species of Rutiodon, Rutiodon carolinensis, encompasses a large number of skulls and assorted postcranial fossils discovered in the Cumnock Formation of North Carolina. Fossils referable to the species are also known from Pennsylvania, New Jersey, and Virginia. Rutiodon carolinensis is the most well-described species of phytosaur in eastern North America, though its validity as a natural taxon has been questioned. Some paleontologists also recognize a larger and more robust species, Rutiodon manhattanensis, which is known from teeth and postcranial fossils from New Jersey and Pennsylvania.

== Description ==
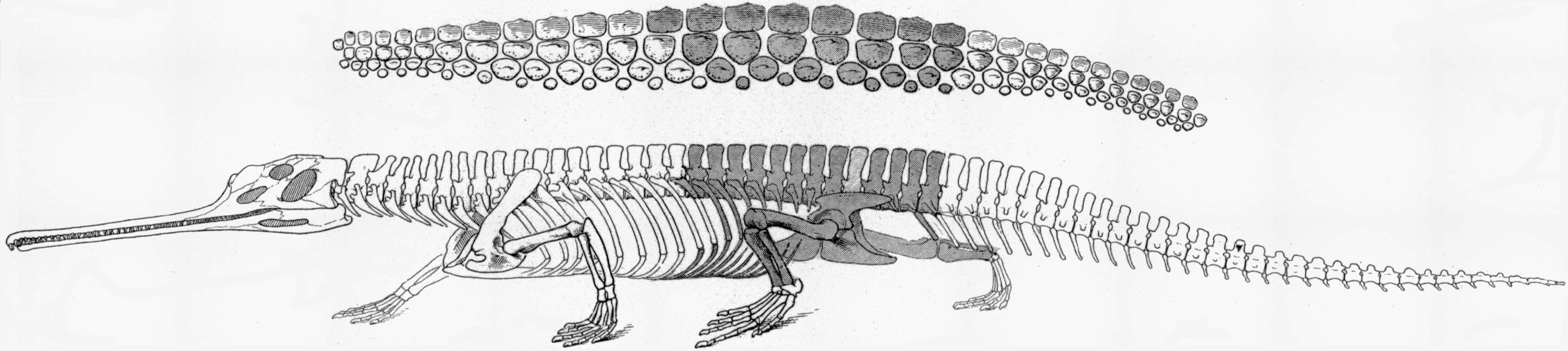
Skeletal diagram of Rutiodon manhattanensis, with preserved portions of the skeleton in grey

Like other phytosaurs, Rutiodon strongly resembled a crocodile, but its nostrils were positioned far back on the head, close to the eyes, instead of at the tip of the snout. It had enlarged front teeth, and a relatively narrow jaw, somewhat resembling that of a modern gharial. This suggests that this carnivore probably caught fish and it may also have snatched land animals (such as Coelophysis) from the waterside. Also, like modern crocodiles, its back, flanks, and tail were covered with bony armored plates.

Rutiodon was among the largest carnivorous animals of its environment, measuring up to 8 metres (26 ft) long and weighing about 1 metric ton (1.1 short tons).

== Species ==
=== R. carolinensis ===
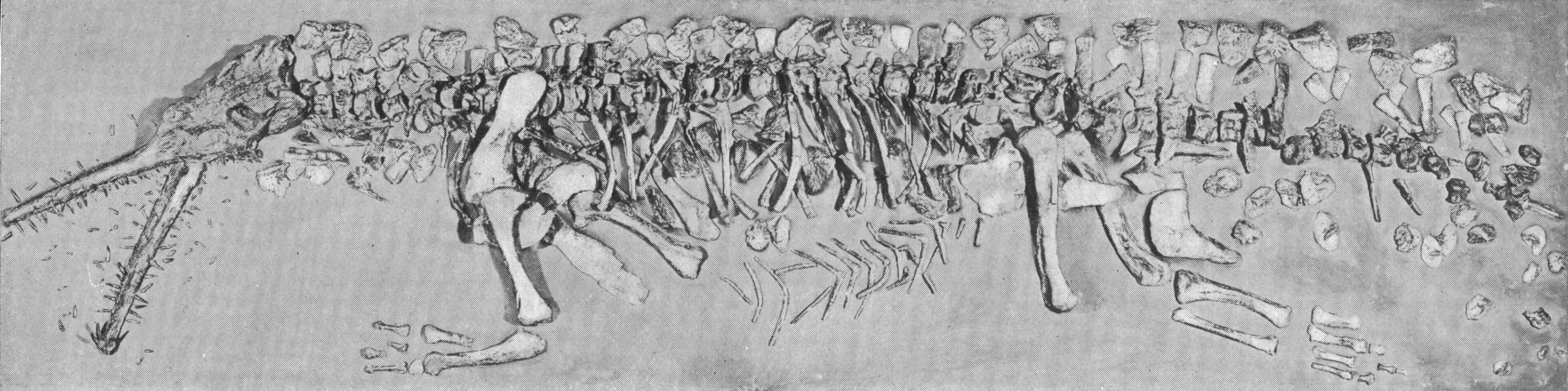
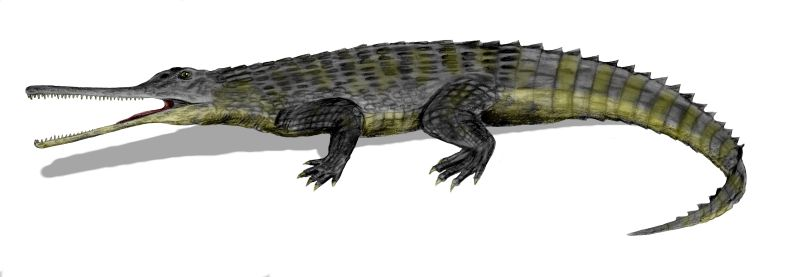
AMNH fossil (top) and life restoration (bottom) of Rutiodon carolinensis

The type species of Rutiodon is R. carolinensis. It was originally named by Ebenezer Emmons in 1856, based on fossils from the Deep River coal field (Cumnock Formation) of North Carolina. The original fossils include five striated teeth and associated vertebrae, ribs, and interclavicle fragments.

Later, Emmons (1860) mentioned that he had discovered a nearly complete skull of R. carolinensis from North Carolina, at the time the most complete phytosaur skull known from the United States. It is also the largest skull referred to Rutiodon, at a length of 77.3 cm (30.4 inches). This skull was described in more detail by Edwin H. Colbert in 1947. Emmons' phytosaur skull was originally stored in the Williams College geological museum, and was later transferred to the National Museum of Natural History (USNM). Many skulls and partial skeletons of R. carolinensis have been discovered near Egypt, North Carolina, and are now housed and displayed at the American Museum of Natural History (AMNH).

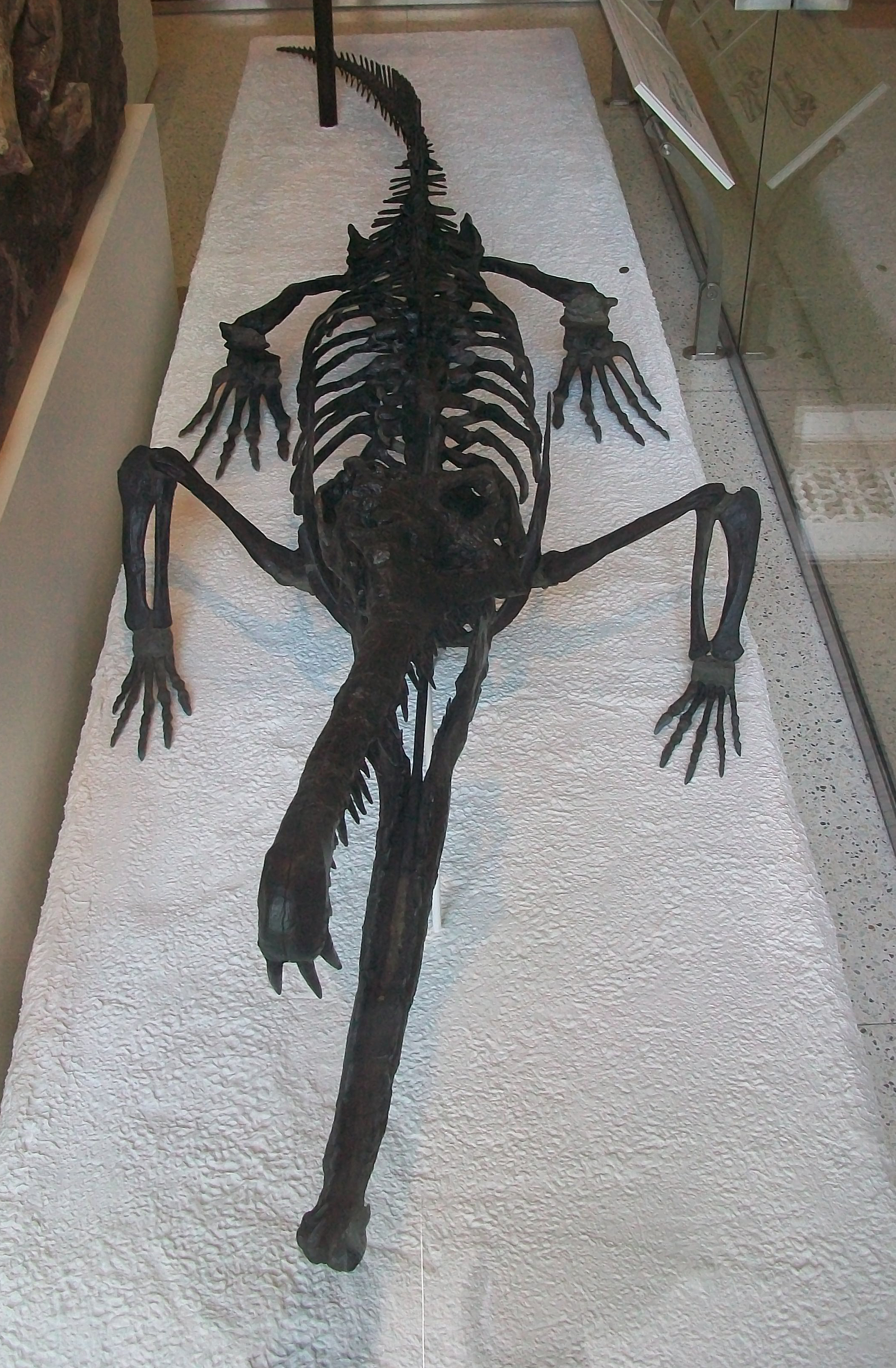
Skeletal mount of R. carolinensis (AMNH 1) viewed from the front

In 1963, a small partial phytosaur skull (AMNH 5500) was discovered at the Granton Quarry of North Bergen, New Jersey. This skull, recovered from grey argillite of the Lockatong Formation, was described by Colbert in 1965. He identified the skull as a probable juvenile specimen of R. carolinensis. Doyle and Sues (1995) described a well-preserved phytosaur skull (SMP VP-45) from the New Oxford Formation in York County, Pennsylvania. This skull was very similar to skulls previously referred to R. carolinesis. They considered R. carolinensis to be an undiagnostic species, as it was originally diagnosed based on teeth. According to these authors, "Rutiodon" is a metataxon of eastern phytosaurs for which monophyly cannot be established.

Since its original description, R. carolinensis has been conflated with various other phytosaur species from the eastern United States. Isaac Lea named several phytosaur species from Pennsylvania shortly before Emmons' description: Clepsysaurus pennsylvanicus (in 1851) and Centemodon sulcatus (in 1856). Both species were compared favorably with R. carolinensis by Emmons, and some authors have noted that either could be considered a senior synonym of Rutiodon. Nevertheless, fossils of R. carolinensis are much more complete, so the validity of the genus is rarely questioned. Clepsysaurus and Centemodon are most commonly considered dubious and undiagnostic, and their fossils have variably been referred to Rutiodon, Phytosaurus, or Phytosauria incertae sedis by different authors.

Othniel Charles Marsh (1893) named Belodon validus, based on a scapula from the New Haven Arkose near Simsbury, Connecticut. In 1896, Marsh mentioned a phytosaur skull from Chatham County, North Carolina. This was the second phytosaur skull found in the area, after that of Emmons (1860). Marsh named his phytosaur skull Rhytidodon rostratus. Belodon validus is considered dubious and undiagnostic, while "Rhytidodon rostratus" (specimen USNM 5373) has been referred to R. carolinensis.

Phytosaur fossils tentatively referred to R. carolinensis were unearthed in 1959 in Fairfax County, Virginia, near Dulles International Airport which was still under construction. These fossils, including vertebrae, ribs, and scutes, were recovered from red calcareous mudstones of the Ball's Bluff Siltstone. This extends the range of Rutiodon (and phytosaurs as a whole) into the Culpeper Basin.

=== R. manhattanensis ===
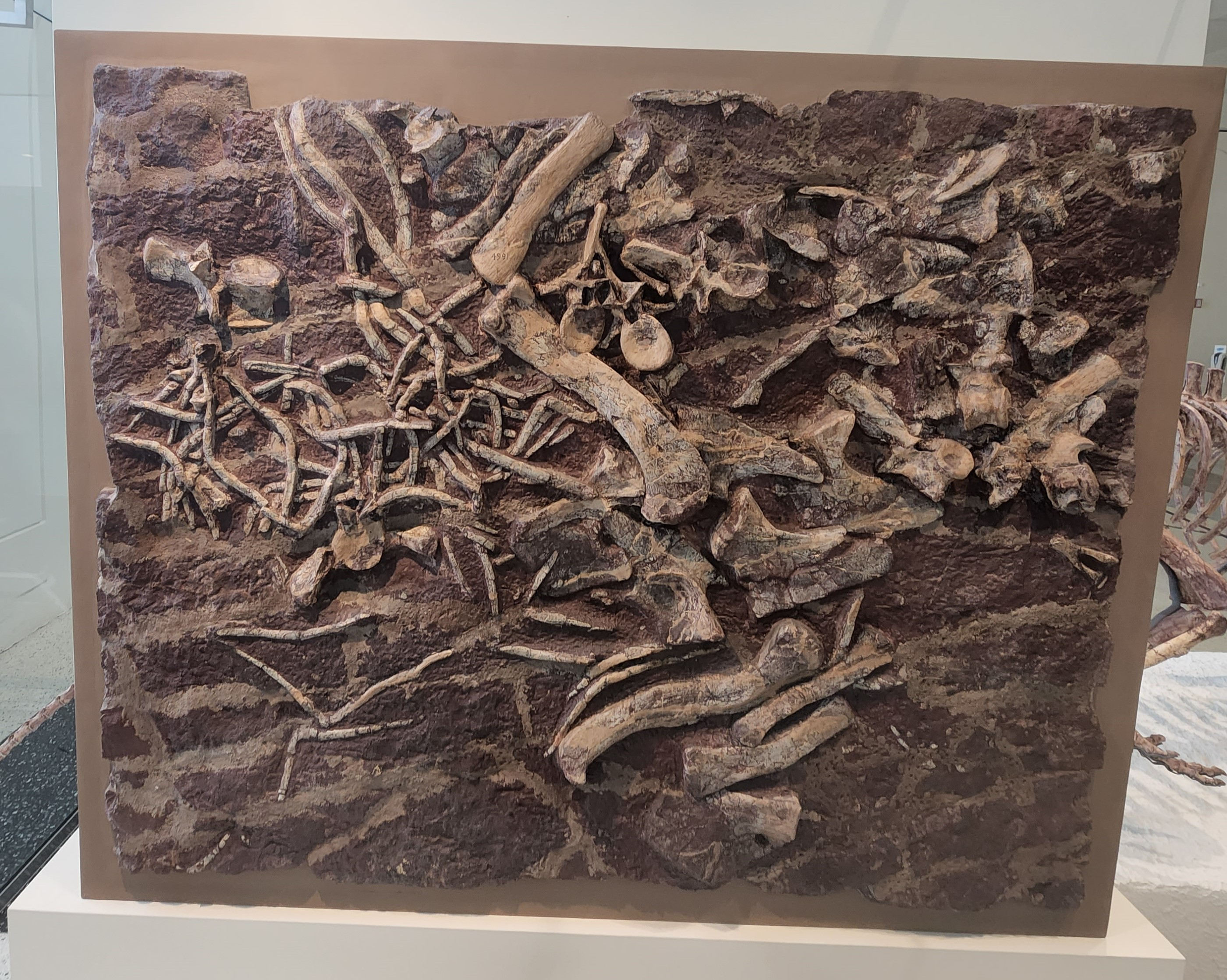
The holotype of R. manhattanensis on display in the American Museum of Natural History

Fossils of a second species, R. manhattanensis, were discovered in 1910 from "red sandy marl" (Stockton Formation) below the Palisades near Fort Lee, New Jersey. In 1913, it was described by Friedrich von Huene, who provided a new species name in reference to its close proximity to Manhattan. The fossil is a partially articulated posterior torso, including the hip, hind limbs (missing the feet), and portions of the tail and scutes. It was differentiated from R. carolinensis based on a proportionally larger tibia and more robust hip. R. manhattanensis is also noticeably larger in size: Huene remarked that the holotype has the largest femur he had ever observed in phytosaurs, at a length of 43-44 cm (17 inches).

Some authors have referred R. manhattanensis to "Clepsysaurus" or Phytosaurus, but its referral to Rutiodon was upheld by Colbert (1965). Very large phytosaur teeth, osteoderms, and hindlimb fossils (specimen YPM-PU 11544) from York, Pennsylvania have also been referred to R. manhattanensis. A few authors have doubted the validity of R. manhattanensis, arguing that the differences between the two species may be due to sexual dimorphism.

== Classification ==
The exact relationship between Rutiodon and other phytosaurs has gone through much revision.

Several papers in the late 20th century extended the scope of the genus Rutiodon, allowing it to encompass phytosaur species from both the eastern and western United States. Western species lumped into Rutiodon include nearly all species previously placed into the genera Leptosuchus, Machaeroprosopus, and Pseudopalatus. A 1995 paper, and most subsequent studies on phytosaurs, disagreed with the idea that Rutiodon encompassed western phytosaur species. The authors re-instated the validity of Machaeroprosopus (with Pseudopalatus as a junior synonym) and Leptosuchus. They also created the new genus Smilosuchus for "Machaeroprosopus" gregorii.

Recent papers agree that Rutiodon occupies a tier of the phytosaur family tree more derived than Paleorhinus and less derived than Leptosuchus. In other words, Rutiodon lies within the large clade Phytosauridae (alternatively known as Mystriosuchinae) and outside the less inclusive clade Leptosuchomorpha. A 2001 conference abstract argued that Rutiodon carolinensis was a synonym of Angistorhinus, mirroring older suggestions that Angistorhinus was directly ancestral to Rutiodon. This interpretation of synonymy has not been formally published. A 2018 analysis of phytosaur relationships did support a placement for Rutiodon carolinensis as the sister taxon of Angistorhinus in a clade at the base of Mystriosuchinae. Later papers describing Volcanosuchus and Colossosuchus, two basal mystriosuchines from the Tiki Formation of India, did not support a sister group relationship between Angistorhinus and Rutiodon. Instead, Angistorhinus was consistently placed as sister to Brachysuchus. Rutiodon was usually recovered as closer to (but still outside) Leptosuchomorpha. Over half of the most parsimonious trees in the 2023 description of Colossosuchus positioned Rutiodon as the sister taxon to Volcanosuchus.

Below is a cladogram from Stocker (2012):

- Phytosauria
  - "Paleorhinus" scurriensis
  - - Paleorhinus bransoni
    - - "Paleorhinus" sawini
      - Phytosauridae
        - Brachysuchus megalodon
        - Angistorhinus
        - - Rutiodon carolinensis
          - "Machaeroprosopus" zunii
          - Protome batalaria
          - Leptosuchomorpha
            - "Phytosaurus" doughtyi
            - TMM 31173-120
            - - Leptosuchus crosbiensis
              - Leptosuchus studeri
            - - - Smilosuchus lithodendrorum
                - - Smilosuchus adamanensis
                  - Smilosuchus gregorii
              - - Pravusuchus hortus
                - Pseudopalatinae
                  - Pseudopalatus mccauleyi
                  - - Mystriosuchus westphali
                    - Pseudopalatus pristinus
