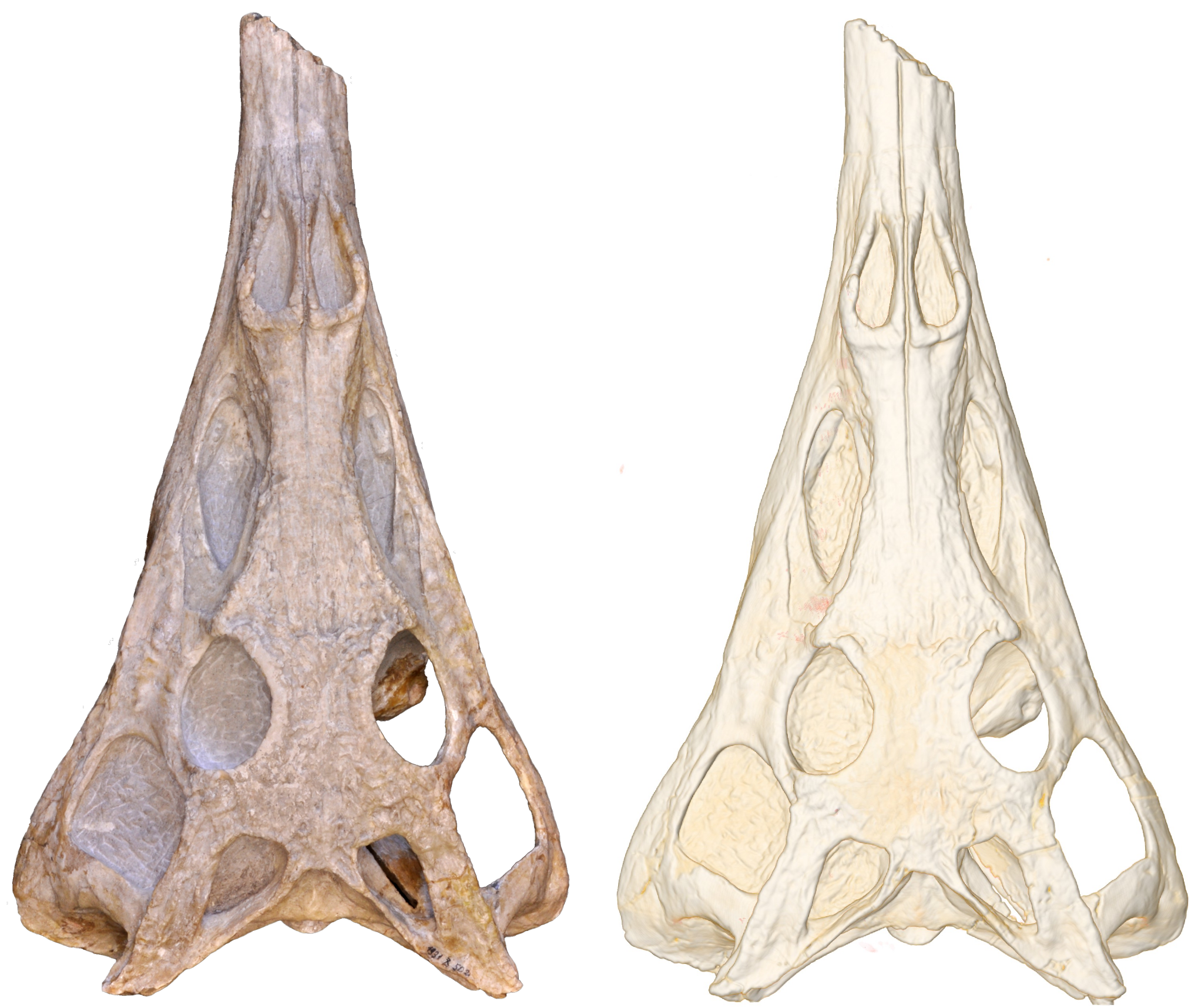
- Skull of the P. angustifrons holotype with CT scan

Scientific classification
- Kingdom: Animalia
- Phylum: Chordata
- Class: Reptilia
- Order: †Phytosauria
- Genus: †Paleorhinus; Williston, 1904

Type species
- †Paleorhinus bransoni Williston, 1904

Species
- †P. angustifrons (Kuhn, 1936 [originally Francosuchus angustifrons]); †P. bransoni Williston, 1904

= Paleorhinus =

Paleorhinus Temporal range: Late Triassic, 221.5–205.6 Ma

Extinct genus of reptiles

Paleorhinus (Greek: "Old Nose") is an extinct genus of widespread basal phytosaur known from the Late Triassic (late Carnian stage). The genus was named in 1904 based on the type species Paleorhinus bransoni, which is known from Wyoming and Texas in the United States. Another valid species, Paleorhinus angustifrons from Bavaria, Germany, is also commonly referred to the genus. Paleorhinus had a length of about 2.5 meters (8.2 feet).

Paleorhinus has had a complicated taxonomic history involving frequent synonymy between diagnostic and undiagnostic material. This is mainly due to the fact that it is a quintessential basal phytosaur, mostly distinguished by a lack of specializations rather than unique traits. Historically, it was common practice to lump all basal phytosaurs into only one or two genera, rendering those genera paraphyletic evolutionary grades ancestral to later phytosaurs. More recently, these grades have been broken up into multiple genera. Arganarhinus magnoculus (from Morocco) and Wannia scurriensis (from Texas) were two phytosaur genera originally considered species of Paleorhinus. "Paleorhinus" sawini (from Texas) and "Paleorhinus" parvus (from Wyoming) are two more phytosaur species informally referred to Paleorhinus, though likely closer to more advanced phytosaurs.

P. angustifrons was originally considered a species of Francosuchus (a dubious phytosaur genus from the same area), and has also been compared to Ebrachosuchus neukami, another Paleorhinus-like Bavarian phytosaur. "Paleorhinus" cf. arenaceus (formerly "Zanclodon" arenaceus), fragmentary phytosaur remains from Poland, may represent Paleorhinus fossils.

Parasuchus hislopi, a basal phytosaur species named in 1885 from fossils discovered in India, was often lumped into Paleorhinus or considered a dubious chimera of phytosaur and rhynchosaur fossils. More complete neotype fossils for Parasuchus hislopi have helped to re-establish it as a valid genus and species. Some phylogenetic analyses suggest that Parasuchus hislopi forms a clade with Paleorhinus bransoni and angustifrons. If this is the case, the valid species of Paleorhinus may instead be considered species of Parasuchus, since that genus name has priority over Paleorhinus.

== Species ==
=== P. bransoni ===
P. bransoni is the type species of Paleorhinus. It was first described and named by Samuel Wendell Williston in 1904 on the basis of the holotype FMNH UC 632, a complete but fragmentary skull that has been extensively reconstructed with plaster. It was collected at Squaw Creek of Fremont County, Wyoming, from the Carnian-aged Popo Agie Formation of the Chugwater Group. The holotype was thoroughly described by Lees (1907). Hunt and Lucas (1991) referred PPM P217 to P. bransoni. It is an incomplete skull that was collected at Palo Duro Canyon, Randall County, west Texas, from the Carnian-aged Camp Springs Member of the Tecovas Formation. Later, Long and Murry (1995) referred additional material, including isolated postcranial remains, to P. bransoni from the Carnian-aged Cooper Canyon Formation of the Dockum Group, Howard County, Texas. TMM 31025-172, a complete skull, was collected at Otis Chalk Quarry 1 (also known as SMU 122), TMM 31100-8, 101, 175, 418, 419, 453 were collected at Otis Chalk Quarry 3, and TMM 31185-11, 38 were collected at Otis Chalk Quarry 3A.

=== P. angustifrons ===
P. angustifrons was first described and named by Oskar Kuhn in 1936 as a species of Francosuchus. P. angustifrons is known exclusively from the holotype BSPG 1931 X 502 a partial skull lacking the rostrum and mandibles. It was collected at Ebrach Quarry, bed number 9 of Bavaria, southern Germany, from the late Carnian-aged Blasensandstein Member of the Hassberge Formation.

Hunt and Lucas (1991) mistakenly referred to F. angustifrons as Ebrachosuchus angustifrons, and considered it and the other two Francosuchus species, F. broilii and F. latus, to be synonyms of Paleorhinus neukami. More recently, P. neukami was found to be more closely related to Mystriosuchinae than to Paleorhinus and thus the genus Ebrachosuchus was re-validated, while F. angustifrons was reassigned as P. angustifrons as it shares unique synapomorphies with P. bransoni and was found to be its sister taxon. The other two Francosuchus species, were not referred to P. angustifrons because they were found to be nomina dubia as their holotypes were destroyed during World War II.

=== P. cf. arenaceus ===
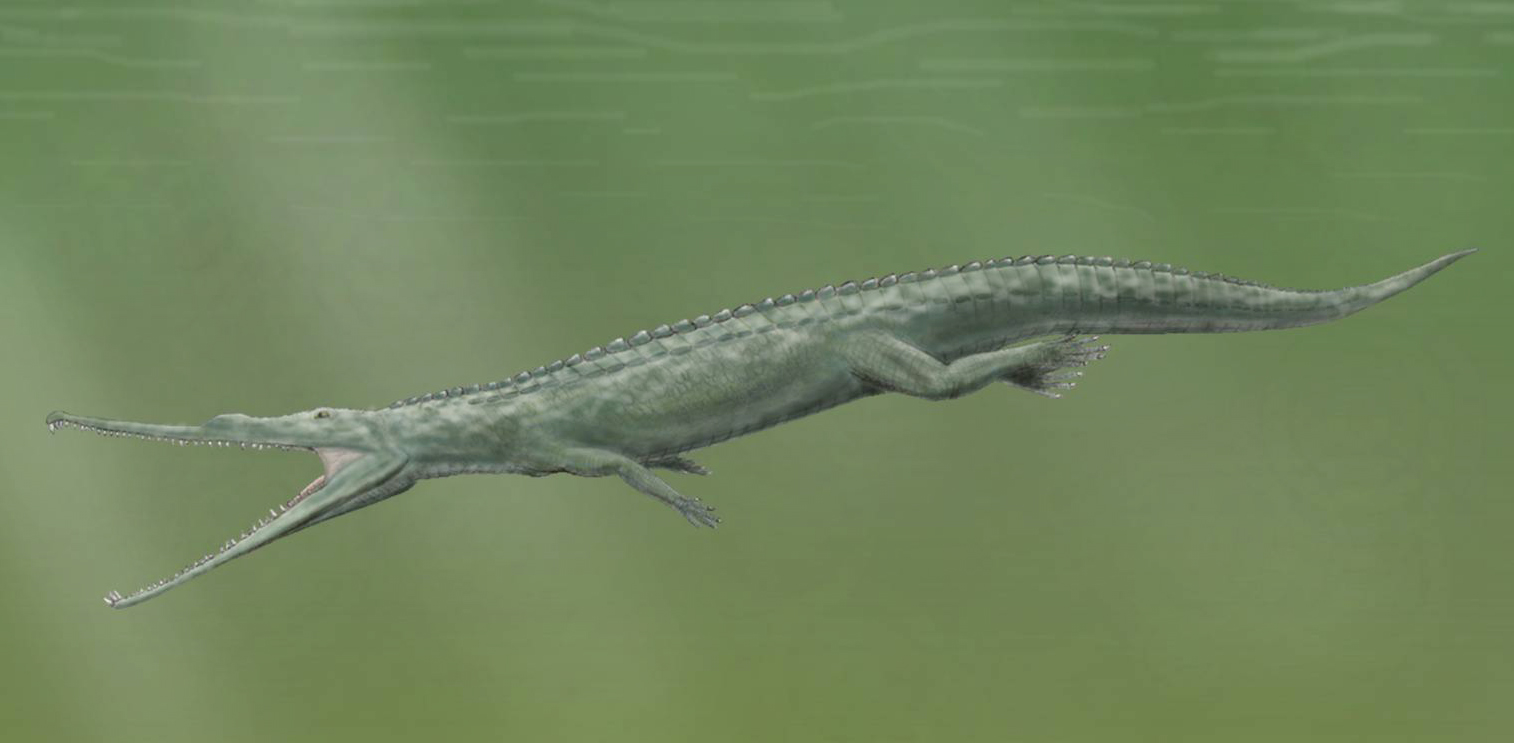
Life restoration of "Paleorhinus" cf. arenaceus

Dzik & Sulej (2007) assigned several skulls, partial articulated postcranial skeletons, and numerous isolated phytosaur bones in various ontogenetic stages from Krasiejów, Poland to Paleorhinus cf. arenaceus. They found some similarities between the material and P. bransoni and also Ebrachosuchus neukami or F. angustifrons (mistakenly referred to as E. broili), as well as some apparent differences with Parasuchus. The shape of the external mandibular fenestra of the material resembled that of "Zanclodon" arenaceus but it is also shared with the proterochampsid Chanaresuchus bonapartei. "Z." arenaceus was suggested to represent the oldest reliably dated phytosaur, and was reassigned to various phytosaur species over the years, including Belodon, Mystriosuchus and Phytosaurus. Although Hungerbühler (2001) redescribed "Z." arenaceus as not belonging to Phytosauria and referred it to Archosauria incertae sedis, Dzik & Sulej (2007) noted that its holotype "does not differ significantly from corresponding parts of the juvenile Krasiejów Paleorhinus, which is clearly a phytosaur". Furthermore, as the Feuerbacher Heide Schilfsandstein, from which "Z." arenaceus was collected, and Krasiejów share species of Metoposaurus, it might be possible that they also share the same species of phytosaur. Even though they agreed that due to the very fragmentary nature of "Z." arenaceus holotype the Krasiejów Paleorhinus can't be referred to it, they tentatively used the name Paleorhinus cf. arenaceus for the Krasiejów Paleorhinus.

=== Other species ===
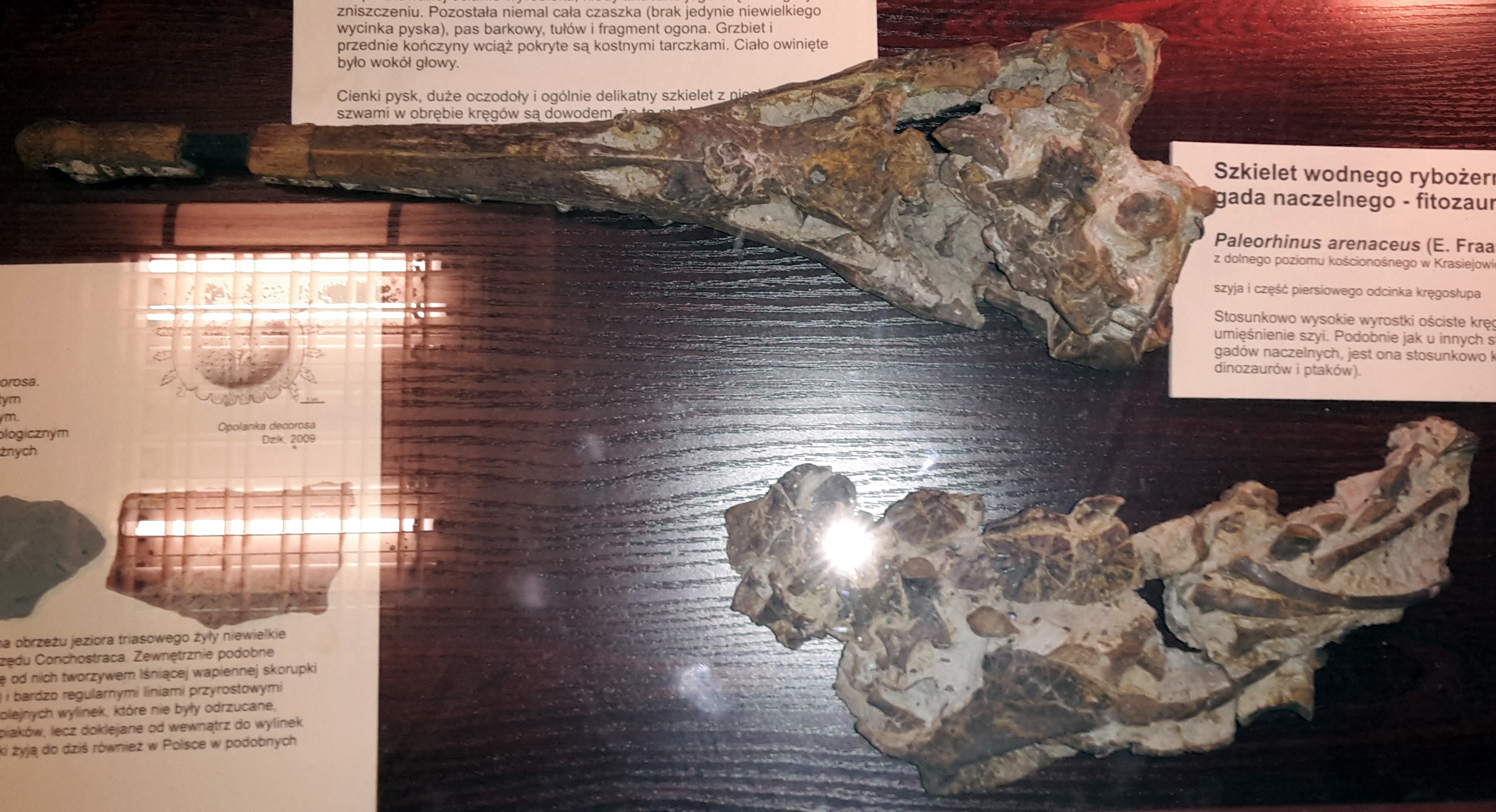
Skull and skeleton from Poland

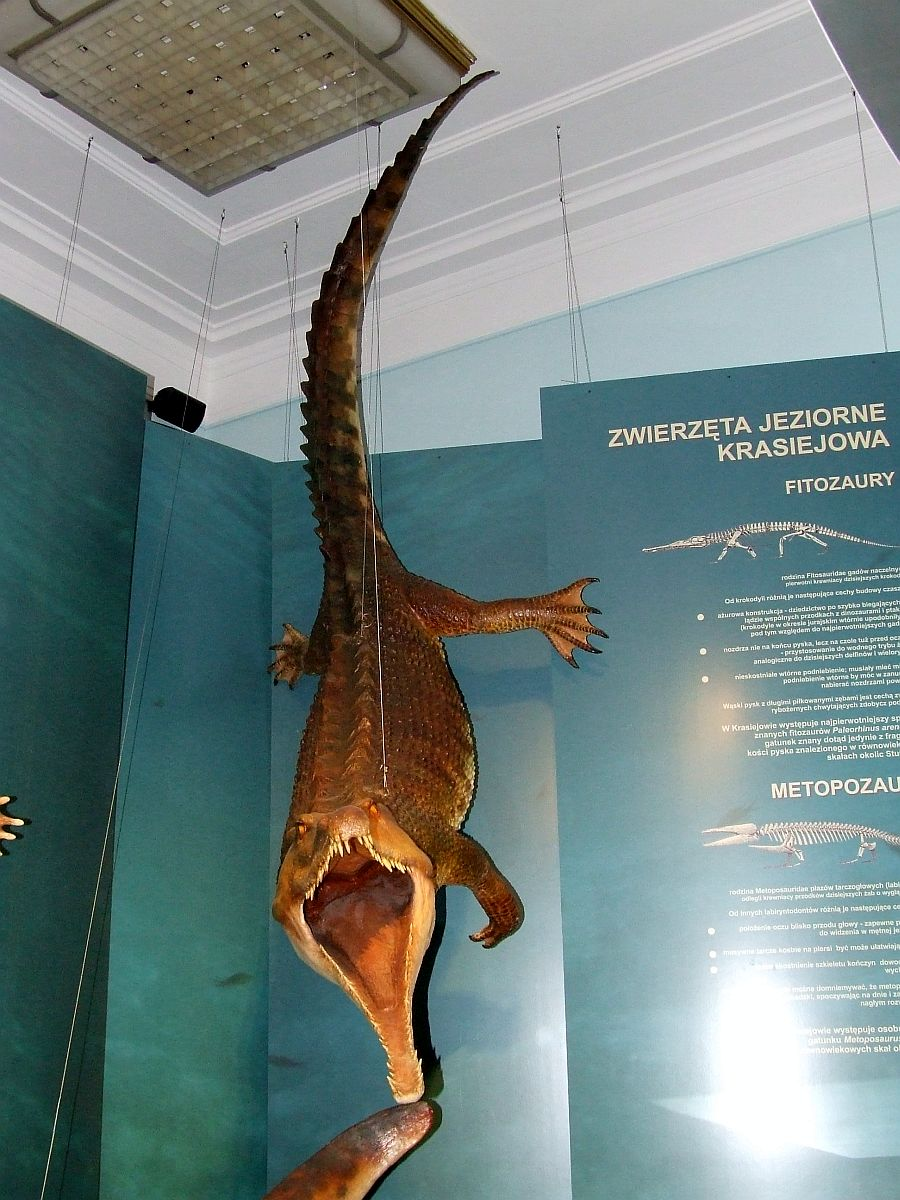
Model based on the Polish remains

Through the years, various species have been referred to as Paleorhinus. The species that are no longer considered to belong to Paleorhinus, are summarised in the list below:

- Ebrachosuchus neukami Kuhn, 1936 - Hunt and Lucas (1991) reassigned the species as Paleorhinus neukami. Subsequent researches accepted this referral. More recently, phylogenetic analysis found E. neukami to be more closely related to Phytosauridae than to Paleorhinus and thus the genus Ebrachosuchus was re-validated.
- Francosuchus broilii and F. latus Kuhn, 1933 - Gregory (1962) and Wastphal (1976) referred these species, as well as, E. neukami and P. angustifrons to Paleorhinus subgenus Francosuchus, while Chatterjee (1978) placed the four species in Francosuchus in a different subfamily. Hunt and Lucas (1991) considered these species to be synonymous with Paleorhinus neukami. More recently, F. broilii and F. latus were considered to be nomina dubia.
- "Francosuchus" trauthi Huene, 1939 - "F." trauthi was synonymized with Paleorhinus, but a re-description of the species by Butler (2013) found no evidence to support the synonymy, or even a phytosaurian identification. Although it is based solely on a rostrum fragment, "F." trauthi was found to possess a unique combination of characters that distinguish it from all other Triassic tetrapods. Thus it was reassigned to a new genus, Dolerosaurus, now referable to Tetrapoda incertae sedis.
- Paleorhinus magnoculus Dutuit, 1977b - Long and Murry (1995) reassigned this species to a new genus Arganarhinus. Although several studies reassigned it back to Paleorhinus, more recent studies disagree with this referral. Kammerer et al. (2016) considered P. magnoculus to be a species of Parasuchus, alongside P. hislopi, P. bransoni, and P. angustifrons.
- "Paleorhinus" parvus Mehl, 1928 - Hunt and Lucas (1991) considered this species to be synonymous with P. bransoni, while Stocker and Butler (2013) suggested that "P." parvus may not be referable to Paleorhinus.
- "Paleorhinus" sawini Long and Murry, 1995 - some studies considered this species to be synonymous with P. bransoni, although recent species-level phylogenetic analyses of phytosaurs suggest that this species is more closely related to Phytosauridae than to P. bransoni and thus can't be referred to Paleorhinus.
- "Paleorhinus" scurriensis Langston, 1949 - Hunt and Lucas (1991) considered this species to be synonymous with P. bransoni, although recent species-level phylogenetic analyses of phytosaurs suggest that this species is basal to the clade formed by P. bransoni and the Phytosauridae, and thus can't be referred to Paleorhinus. This species was reassigned to its own genus, Wannia by Stocker (2013), and represents the most basal known phytosaur.
- Parasuchus hislopi Lydekker, 1885 - P. hislopi was based on a chimeric syntype material - a rhynchosaurian basicranium mixed with phytosaurian partial snout, scutes and some teeth. Friedrich von Huene (1940) identified the basicranium as belonging to Paradapedon huxleyi (now known as Hyperodapedon huxleyi), thus he assigned the phytosaurian material to a newly named species "aff." Brachysuchus maleriensis. Later, Edwin Harris Colbert (1958) designated all the Indian parasuchian material as Phytosaurus maleriensis. Gregory (1962) accepted this proposal. Sankar Chatterjee (1978), who described many complete remains of the Indian parasuchian, showed that it is not assignable either to Brachysuchus (which is closely related to or synonymous with Angistorhinus), or to Phytosaurus (a doubtful name, probably the senior synonym of Nicrosaurus). He noted that since the rhynchosaur basicranium is neither the holotype of P. hislopi, nor the lectotype of Paradapedon huxleyi, the suppression of P. hislopi should be avoided. Nevertheless, Hunt and Lucas (1991) considered the species to be a nomen dubium, and provisionally created the combination Paleorhinus hislopi for the diagnosable phytosaur specimens from the Lower Maleri Formation, stating that the Indian species can be distinguished from other Paleorhinus species. To avoid additional confusion, the nondiagnostic holotype of P. hislopi was replaced by a neotype with approval from the ICZN (Opinion 2045) following the application of Chatterjee (2001). As a result, most subsequent studies referred all Paleorhinus species to Parasuchus in accordance with the rules of the ICZN, while others kept referring P. hislopi to Paleorhinus. In light of the complex taxonomic history of Paleorhinus, studies as of 2013 considered the synonymy between the genera to be premature. However, later studies argued that Paleorhinus bransoni and Paleorhinus angustifrons formed a strong clade with Parasuchus hislopi. This clade would receive the name Parasuchus under ICZN rules, formally synonymizing the two genera in this more restricted sense.
- Promystriosuchus ehlersi Case, 1922 - Gregory (1962) and Hunt and Lucas (1991) referred this taxon to Paleorhinus on the genus level, and considered it to be a nomen dubium on the species level, due to the poor preservation of it holotype and only known specimen. Stocker and Butler (2013) suggested that P. ehlersi may not be referable to Paleorhinus and referred it to Phytosauria incertae sedis.

=== Phylogeny ===
The following cladogram, from Kammerer et al., 2016, shows the relationships of P. bransoni, P. angustifrons, and "P." sawini to other phytosaurs. The authors placed P. bransoni and P. angustifrons into the genus Parasuchus, owing to their close relationship with Parasuchus hislopi.

- Parasuchidae
  - Wannia scurriensis
  - - - Parasuchus (Paleorhinus) bransoni
      - - Parasuchus (Paleorhinus) angustifrons
        - Parasuchus hislopi
    - - Ebrachosuchus neukami
      - Mystriosuchinae
        - Angistorhinus
        - "Paleorhinus" sawini
        - Brachysuchus megalodon
        - - Protome batalaria
          - "Machaeroprosopus" zunii
          - Rutiodon carolinensis
          - Leptosuchomorpha
            - TMM 31173-120
            - "Phytosaurus" doughtyi
            - - - Smilosuchus lithodendrorum
                - - Smilosuchus gregorii
                  - Smilosuchus adamanensis
              - - Pravusuchus hortus
                - Mystriosuchini
                  - Machaeroprosopus mccauleyi
                  - - Machaeroprosopus pristinus
                    - - Machaeroprosopus jablonskiae
                      - Mystriosuchus westphali
