= Dolerosaurus =

Dolerosaurus Temporal range: Late Triassic, 231–228 Ma

Scientific classification
- Domain: Eukaryota
- Kingdom: Animalia
- Phylum: Chordata
- Class: Reptilia
- Clade: Romeriida
- Clade: Diapsida
- Genus: †Dolerosaurus; Butler, 2013

Type species
- †Francosuchus trauthi Huene, 1939

Extinct genus of reptiles

Dolerosaurus is an extinct genus of diapsid known from the early Late Triassic (late Carnian stage) upper Lunz Formation of Austria. Dolerosaurus was first named by Richard J. Butler in 2013 and the type species is Francosuchus trauthi.

== Discovery and naming ==
In 1939 Friedrich von Huene named a new species of the phytosaur Francosuchus, F. trauthi, based upon a small fragment of rostrum. It was at some point later referred to Paleorhinus, but in 2013, it was renamed to the new genus Dolerosaurus. Unfortunately very little can be said about Dolerosaurus given that its holotype fossil is so small (c.5 centimetres (2.0 in) long) and the known remains are so scant. Dolerosaurus was referred to Phytosauria in 1939, but after subsequent analyses in 2013, it was reclassified as a basal diapsid.
