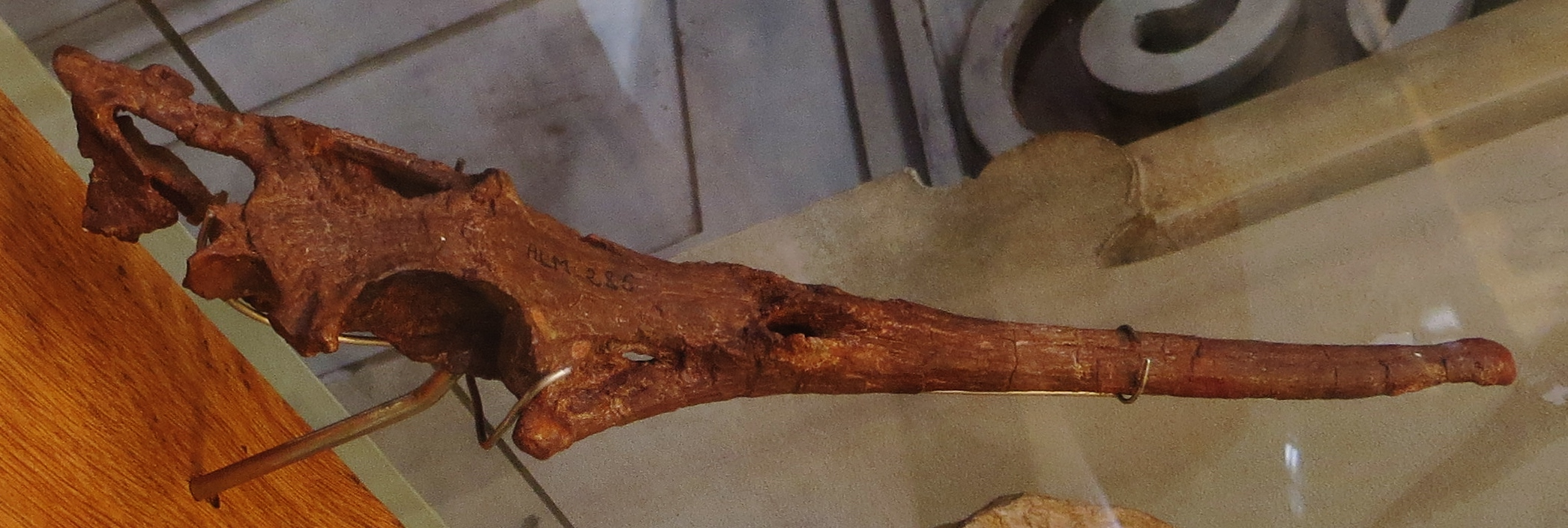
- Holotype skull

Scientific classification
- Domain: Eukaryota
- Kingdom: Animalia
- Phylum: Chordata
- Class: Reptilia
- Clade: Archosauromorpha
- Clade: Archosauriformes
- Order: †Phytosauria
- Family: †Parasuchidae
- Genus: †Arganarhinus; Long & Murry, 1995

Type species
- †Arganarhinus magnoculus (Dutuit, 1977b [originally Paleorhinus magnoculus])

Synonyms
- Paleorhinus magnoculus Dutuit, 1977b

= Arganarhinus =

Arganarhinus Temporal range: Late Triassic, 221 Ma

Extinct genus of reptiles

Arganarhinus (meaning "Argana (Morocco) snout") is an extinct genus of phytosaur known from the late Triassic period (Middle Carnian stage) of Argana Basin in Morocco. It is known from a skull which is housed at the Muséum national d'Histoire naturelle. It was first named as a species of Paleorhinus in 1977b by Jean Michel Dutuit and it was named as a separate genus by Long and Murry in 1995. The type species is the original Paleorhinus magnoculus and the combinatio nova is Arganarhinus magnoculus. Its closest relative was Paleorhinus.
