= Wannia =

Wannia Temporal range: Late Triassic, 230–220 Ma

Scientific classification
- Domain: Eukaryota
- Kingdom: Animalia
- Phylum: Chordata
- Class: Reptilia
- Clade: Archosauromorpha
- Clade: Archosauriformes
- Order: †Phytosauria
- Genus: †Wannia; Stocker, 2013

Type species
- †Paleorhinus scurriensis Langston, 1949

Extinct genus of reptiles

Wannia is an extinct genus of basal phytosaur reptile known from the Late Triassic (late Carnian or early Norian stage) of Texas, southern United States. It contains a single species, Wannia scurriensis, which is known from a single specimen. This species was originally named as a species referred to Paleorhinus and later was considered as a possible junior synonym of Paleorhinus bransoni. However its re-description revealed five autapomorphies, and a phylogenetic position as the most basal known phytosaur, justifying the erection of a new generic name for the species.

== Discovery and naming ==
Wannia was first described and named by the late Dr. Wann Langston Jr. in 1949 as a species referable to Paleorhinus, P. scurriensis. An alternative generic name, Wannia, was proposed by Michelle R. Stocker in 2013 creating the new combination Wannia scurriensis. The generic name honors Langston for his extensive work on archosaur palaeontology, and the specific name refers to the Scurry County where the holotype was found. Wannia is known solely from the holotype TTU P-00539, a partial skull preserved in two parts housed at Texas Tech University. TTU P-11422, a partial juvenile skull, had also been referred to "P." scurriensis, however Stocker (2013) found no basis for this referral as the specimens do not share any synapomorphies. The holotype was collected near Lake Alan Henry, 4 km northeast of the town of Camp Springs, from the Camp Springs Formation of the Dockum Group. Previously known as the Camp Springs Conglomerate, this unit probably correlates with the lower member of the Santa Rosa Sandstone in Texas and the Tecololito Member of the Santa Rosa Formation in New Mexico. The age of this unit is not precisely known, it was originally considered to be late Carnian based on correlations with the Opponitzer Limestone of Austria, using the presence of Dolerosaurus, which was previously considered to be a member of Paleorhinus. However, recent zircon radiometric dating suggests that the Santa Rosa Sandstone is equivalent to the Norian-aged Shinarump Member. Furthermore, the Post Quarry which is within the stratigraphically higher Cooper Canyon Formation of the Dockum Group was recently demonstrated to be mid Norian (220–215 Ma). Thus the most probable age for the Camp Springs Formation and the lower member of the Santa Rosa Sandstone is latest Carnian or early Norian.

== Description ==
Stocker (2013) diagnosed Wannia scurriensis using five unambiguous autapomorphies (unique traits) and additionally by a unique combination of characters. Unlike all other phytosaurs, the basitubera, areas at the base of the skull in front of its attachment point with the neck, are widely separated mediolaterally. A distinctive ridge is present on the lateral surface of the jugal bone. A thickened shelf is present along the posteroventral edge of an expanded "wing" formed by the pterygoid bone and the quadrate bone. A swelling on the nasal bone is present behind the posterior borders of the nares. Finally, the "septomaxillae", probably not homologous to the septomaxillae of squamates and synapsids, do not contact one another and do not form part of the internarial septum. Eight characters are shared by Wannia and all other phytosaurs (synapomorphies), including nares that are directed dorsally and the presence of separate ossification, the septomaxilla, anterior to the nasals and surrounded by the premaxilla.

Although a synonymy between Wannia scurriensis and Paleorhinus bransoni was previously suggested, Wannia scurriensis differs from Paleorhinus bransoni in lacking a contact between the premaxilla and palatine bone, as seen in Paleorhinus angustifrons and Ebrachosuchus neukami. Additionally, W. scurriensis differs from both species of Paleorhinus in the presence of a ridge, rather than a row of nodes, on the lateral surface of the jugal. The small partial skull previously catalogued as referable to this species, TTU P-11422, does not share any diagnostic characters with the holotype. The specimens can be compared only in the area surrounding the right antorbital fenestra. Although TTU P-11422 does have a large antorbital fossa with a slightly posterodorsally inclined antorbital fenestra as in W. scurriensis, the nasals just posterior to the nares are not swollen in contrast to the autapomorphic condition seen in the latter. However, a further preparation of TTU P-11422 may reveal additional morphological traits.
