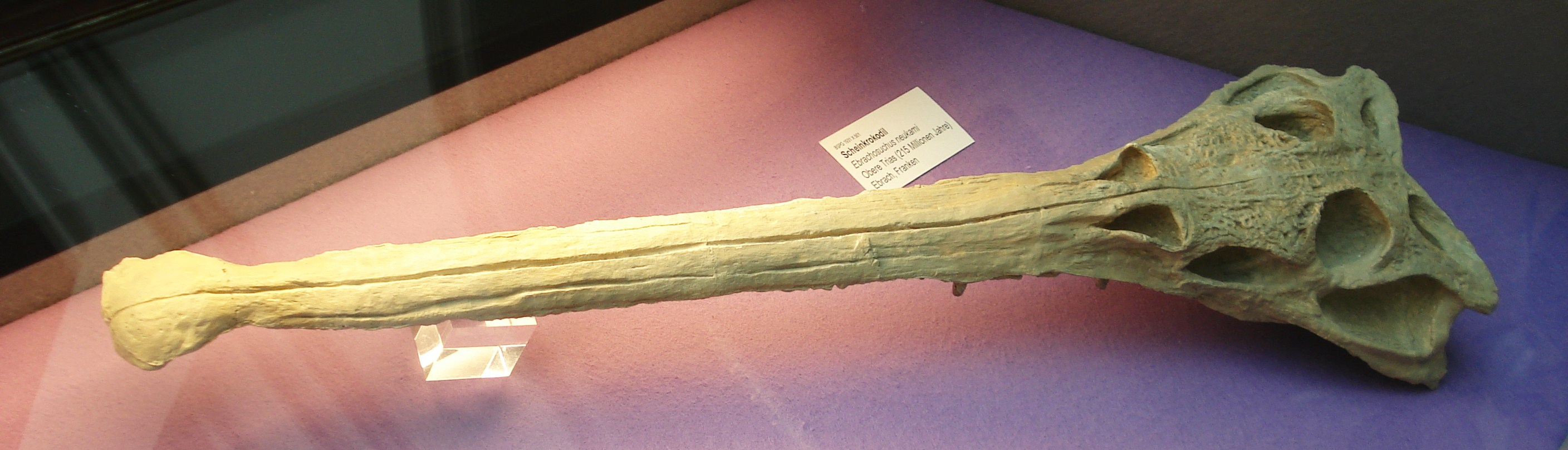
- Ebrachosuchus neukami

Scientific classification
- Kingdom: Animalia
- Phylum: Chordata
- Class: Reptilia
- Order: †Phytosauria
- Genus: †Ebrachosuchus; Kuhn, 1936

Type species
- †Ebrachosuchus neukami Kuhn, 1936

Synonyms
- Paleorhinus neukami (Kuhn, 1936)

= Ebrachosuchus =

Ebrachosuchus Temporal range: Late Triassic, 231–228 Ma

Extinct genus of reptiles

Ebrachosuchus is an extinct genus of basal phytosaur known from the Late Triassic (late Carnian stage) of Bavaria, southern Germany. It is known only from the holotype BSPG 1931 X 501, a complete skull missing both mandibles. It was collected at Ebrach Quarry, bed number 9 from the late Carnian-aged Blasensandstein Member of the Hassberge Formation. It was first named by Oskar Kuhn in 1936 and the type species is Ebrachosuchus neukami.

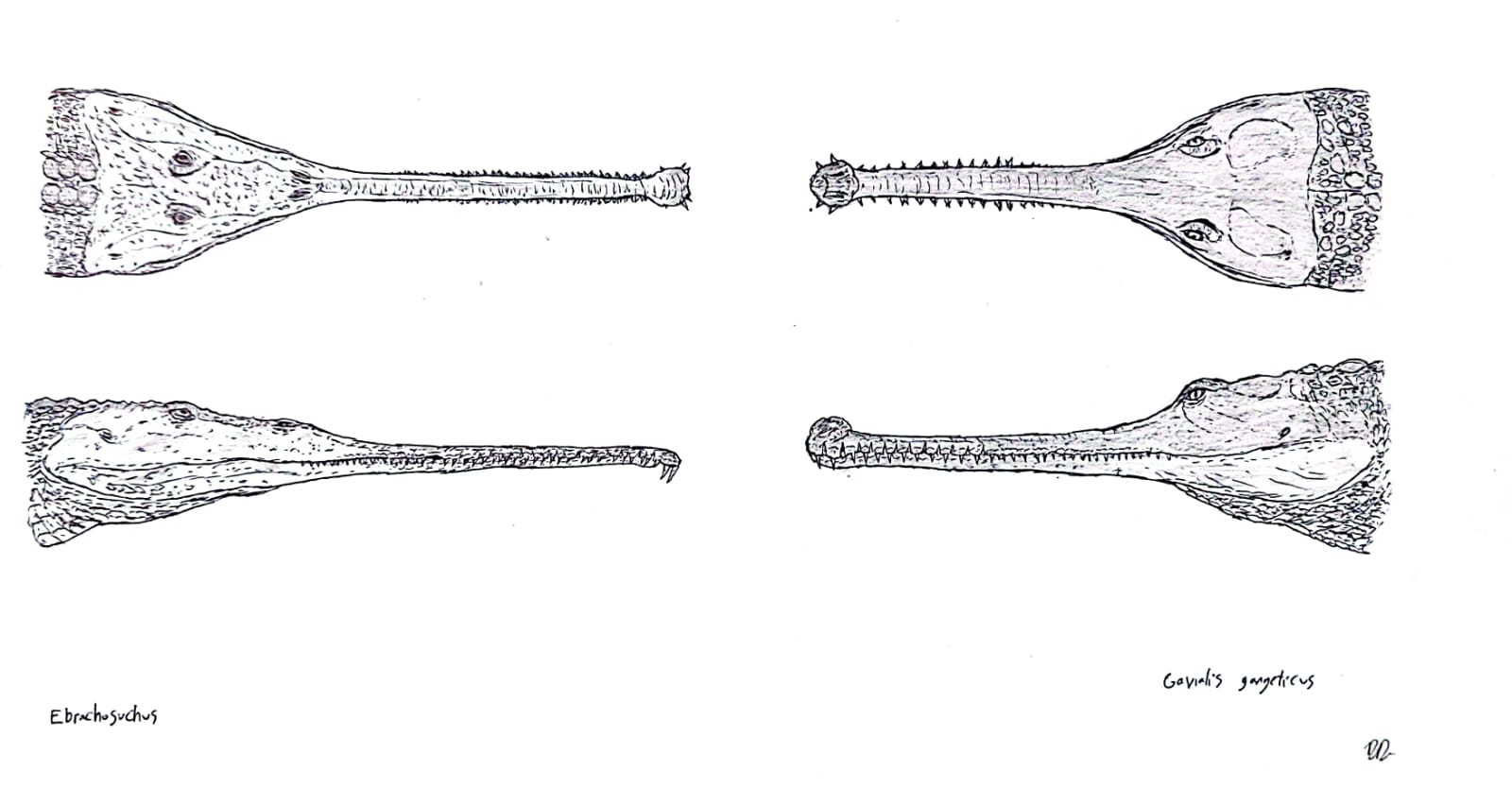
Reconstruction of Ebrachosuchus (left)

Hunt and Lucas (1991) mistakenly referred to Francosuchus angustifrons as Ebrachosuchus angustifrons, and considered it and the other two Francosuchus species, F. broilii and F. latus, to be synonyms of E. neukami. Furthermore, they reassigned the species to Paleorhinus, and synonymized Ebrachosuchus with the former. Subsequent researches accepted this referral. More recently, a phylogenetic analysis found E. neukami to be more closely related to Mystriosuchinae than to Paleorhinus and thus the genus Ebrachosuchus was re-validated, while F. angustifrons was reassigned as P. angustifrons as it shares unique synapomorphies with the type species of Paleorhinus (P. bransoni) and was found to be its sister taxon. F. broilii and F. latus were also removed from E. neukami, as they were found to be nomina dubia.
