= Oskar Kuhn =

German palaeontologist

Oskar Kuhn (7 March 1908, Munich – 1 May 1990) was a German palaeontologist.

== Life and career ==
Kuhn was educated in Dinkelsbühl and Bamberg and then studied natural science, specialising in geology and paleontology, at the Ludwig-Maximilians-Universität München (LMU), from which he received his D. Phil. in 1932.

He worked at the LMU's Geological Institute, among other things on the Fossilium Catalogus (Catalogue of Fossils), and then in 1938 on a stipend from the Deutsche Forschungsgemeinschaft, moved to the University of Halle, where he worked on the Geiseltal fossils. In 1939 he achieved his Habilitation with a thesis on the Halberstadt Keuper fauna, and in 1940 was named Privatdozent in geology and paleontology.

Informed by his Catholic religion, Kuhn was an exponent of idealistic morphology: he viewed evolution as operating only within predetermined morphological classes. In 1943 he declared, "The theory of descent has collapsed." After a political conflict with his mentor, Johannes Weigelt, over evolution, Kuhn's teaching certification was withdrawn (in an act known as "remotion") in November 1941. He had to leave Halle and was immediately called up for wartime service in the Wehrmacht. In February 1942 he was released because of lung disease. (He had been a member of the SA from 1933 to 1936 but left for health reasons.)

In 1947 he became professor extraordinarius at the University of Bamberg, but left after a short time.

== Selected works ==
- Paläozoologie in Tabellen. (1940)
- Lehrbuch der Paläozoologie. (Textbook of Paleontology) (1949)
- Die Deszendenztheorie: Grundlegung der Ganzheitsbiologie. (1951)
- Lebensbilder und Evolution fossiler Saurier, Amphibien und Reptilien. (1961) (with Hartmut Haubold)
- Die Vorzeitlichen Wirbellosen. System und Evolution. (1966)
- Handbuch der Paläoherpetologie - Encyclopedia of Paleoherpetology. Stuttgart, New York: G. Fischer, 1978- . ISBN 3-89937-007-4. OCLC.
