= Volcanosuchus =

Volcanosuchus Temporal range: Late Triassic 235–221.5 Ma

Scientific classification
- Kingdom: Animalia
- Phylum: Chordata
- Class: Reptilia
- Order: †Phytosauria
- Family: †Parasuchidae
- Subfamily: †Mystriosuchinae
- Genus: †Volcanosuchus; Datta, Ray & Bandyopadhyay, 2019

Type species
- †Volcanosuchus statisticae Datta, Ray & Bandyopadhyay, 2019

Extinct genus of reptiles

Volcanosuchus is an extinct genus of parasuchid phytosaurs from the Late Triassic Tiki Formation in India. The type species is V. statisticae. The phytosaur by the marginal overlapping of the nostrils by the antorbital fenestrae, external nares based on a bulbous and raised dome, the lateral surface of the jugal ornamented by a distinct ridge defined by multiple tubercles and radiating string‐like structures, and distinct ornamentation pattern on the rostrum and the skull's roof. The species ranged form the late Carnian to the early/middle Norian.

== Description ==
=== Skull ===
The skull of the holotype ISIR 44 is estimated to be around 555 mm (around 21 in), is robust, and has a high skull table. The premaxillary rostrum is somewhat thick, and the premaxilla's width measuring at 42 mm (about 2 in), with an arching dorsal surface. The premaxilla develops posteriorly and has sutural contact with the septomaxilla.
