= Riachuelo =

Riachuelo is a word in the Spanish language, meaning a small river with little current or a brook or an arroyo.

Riachuelo may also refer to:

== Places ==
=== Argentina ===
- Riachuelo River or Matanza River, a stream in the Buenos Aires Province
- Villa Riachuelo, a barrio of Buenos Aires

=== Brazil ===
- Riachuelo, Rio de Janeiro, a neighborhood of Rio de Janeiro, Brazil
- Riachuelo, Sergipe, a municipality in the Brazilian state of Sergipe
- Riachuelo, Rio Grande do Norte, a municipality in the state of Rio Grande do Norte

=== Chile ===
- Riachuelo, Chile, a village in Osorno Province, south-central Chile

== Battle ==
- Battle of the Riachuelo, a naval battle in the Paraguayan War named for Riachuelo stream, Corrientes Province, Argentina

== Ships ==
- Brazilian battleship Riachuelo, an 1883 Brazilian ironclad battleship
- Brazilian battleship Riachuelo (1914), a Brazilian battleship cancelled due to World War I
- Brazilian submarine Riachuelo (S22), a 1975 Oberon-class submarine now a museum ship in Rio de Janeiro
- Brazilian submarine Riachuelo (S40), a brazilian submarine, leader of Riachuelo Class

== Companies ==
- Lojas Riachuelo, a Brazilian department store company

== Films ==
- Riachuelo (film), 1934 film directed by Luis Moglia Barth

== Geology ==
- The Riachuelo Formation, an Early to Late Cretaceous geological formation, located near Riachuelo, Sergipe State, Brazil
