= Riachuelo Formation =

Geologic formation in Brazil

- Stratigraphic range: Late Aptian-Early Cenomanian; ~115–97 Ma
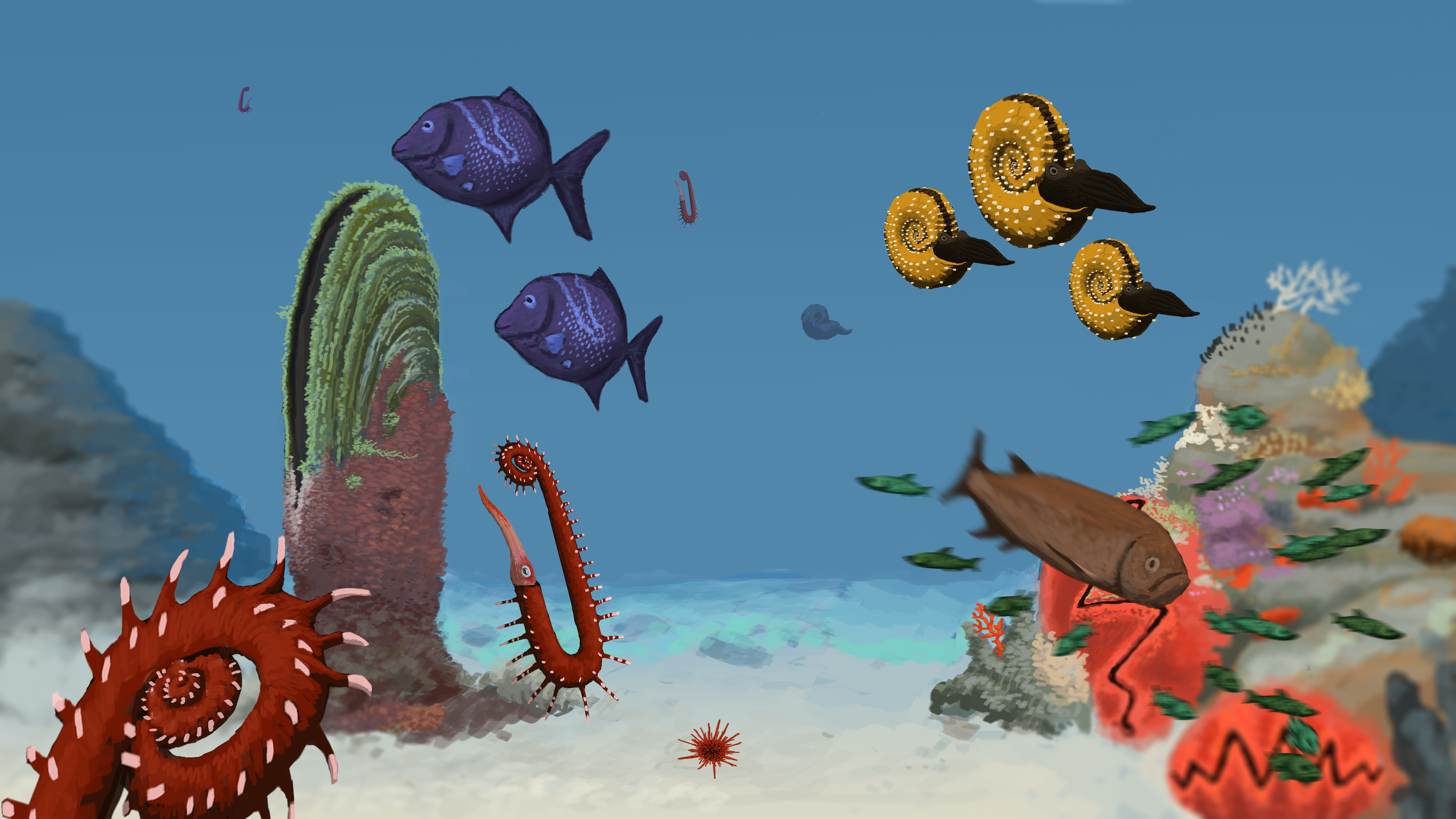
- Reconstruction of the fauna from the Riachuelo Formation
- Type: Geological formation
- Sub-units: Angico Member Taquari Member Maruim Member
- Underlies: Cotinguiba Formation
- Overlies: Muribeca Formation
- Thickness: 500 m (1,600 ft)

Lithology
- Primary: Packstone, Grainstone
- Other: Mudstone, siltstone, siliciclastic

Location
- Region: Sergipe-Alagoas Basin of Northeastern Brazil
- Country: Brazil
- Extent: 20 kilometres (12 mi)

Type section
- Named for: Riachuelo, Sergipe
- Named by: Moraes Rego (1929)

The Riachuelo Formation is a geologic formation of the Early to Late Cretaceous (Late Aptian to Cenomanian) age in northeastern Brazil's Sergipe-Alagoas Basin. It is the first Formation of the Basin to contain sediments deposited under fully marine conditions. The formation is subdivided into three members: Angico, Taquari and Maruim.

The formation has provided fossils of ammonites, gastropods, bivalves, brachiopods, serpulids, equinoderms, ostracoids, radiolarians, lobsters and Crabs. Several fish species reported from the Santana Formation also occur in this formation, namely: Cladocyclus gardneri, Neoproscinetes penalvai, Notelops brama, Rhacolepis buccalis, Tharrhias araripis and Vinctifer comptoni. Santanichthys diasii is also reported from the Taquari Member of the Riachuelo Formation. Teeth and vertebrae of elasmobranchii have also been found in the formation.

== Description ==
The Riachuelo Formation is a 500 metres (1,600 ft) thick mix of Aptian and Albian sediments formed by high-energy shelf carbonate deposits (oncolitic-oolitic-peloidal-bioclastic packstones and grainstones), interbedded with lagoonal mudstones and siltstones, and fan-delta like siliciclastic rocks. It overlies Muribeca Formation and underlies the Cotinguiba Formation. The formation sprouts in a track approximately 20 km wide and it extends itself between the cities of Itaporanga d’Ajuda and Pacatuba. It also has outcrops in the cities of Riachuelo, Santa Rosa de Lima, Divina Pastora, Laranjeiras, Rosário do Catete, Maruim, General Maynard and Carmópolis.

There are three members of this formation: Angico Member, whose environment has been interpreted as costal areas consisting of the basin margins and grabens, deltaic fans formed, and the coarse sediments they carried, the Maruim Member, in the lower sedimentation areas, with carbonate ramps and dolomitized oolite/oncolite banks deposited under fluctuating sea level conditions, and the Taquari Member, corresponding to calcareous mudstone and shale from lagoonal and slope environments.

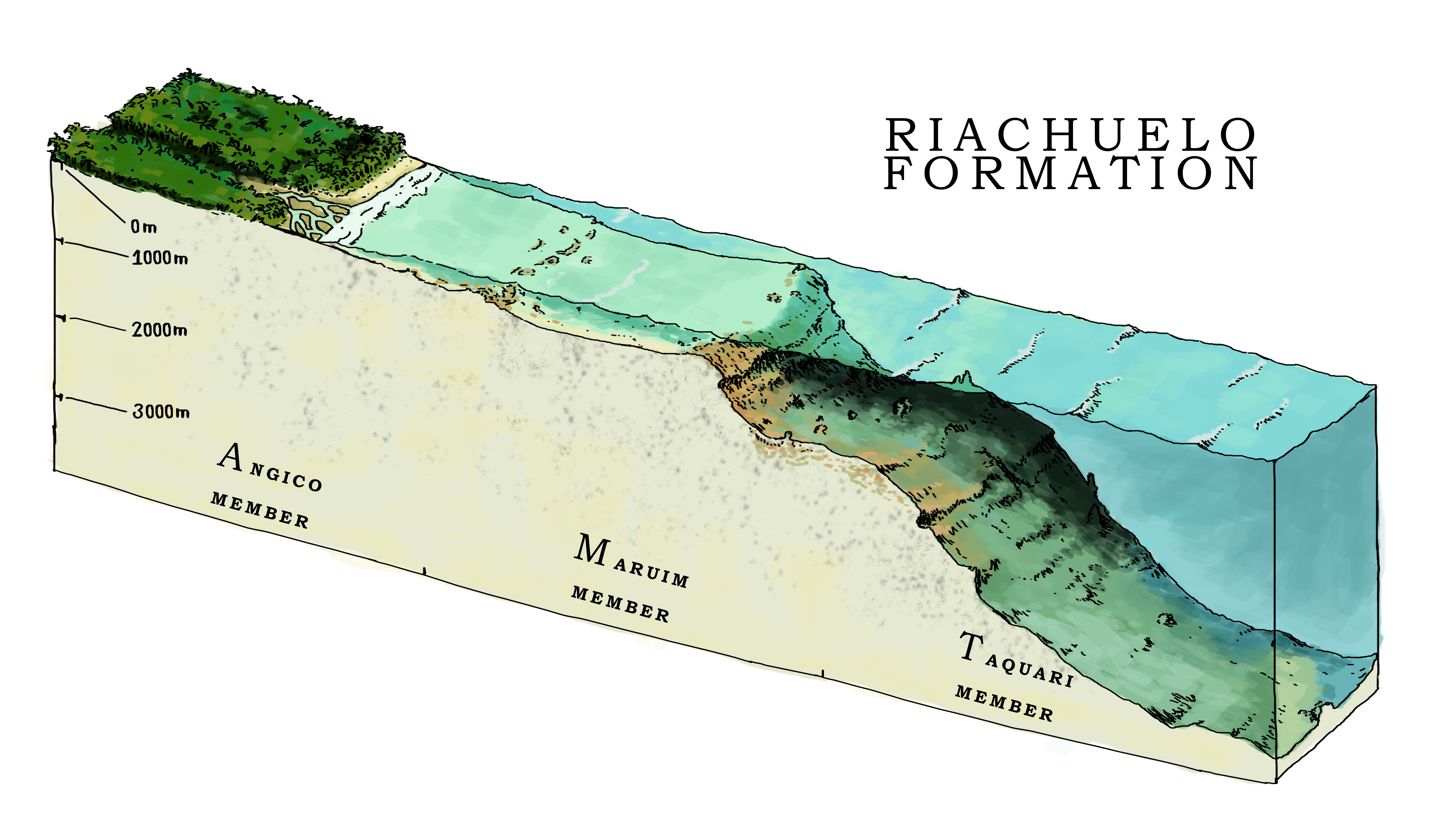
Cross section of riachuelo formation's shelf and sea.

Ammonites are particularly plentiful and have provided a firm biocronostratigraphic control for the basin. The succession of ammonites is divided in five zones: The Epicheloniceras-Diadochoceras-Eodouvilleiceras zone, from the Aptian, the Douvilleiceras zone, from the lower Albian, the Oxytropidoceras zone, from the middle Albian, and the Elobiceras and Mortoniceras-Neokentroceras zones, both from the late Albian.

== History ==
The name Riachuelo Formation was used for the first time in the geological literature by Moraes Rego in 1929. Then, in 1959, Bender made a new interpretation, separating the upper part of the Riachuelo Formation from the lower one, naming it Maruim. This lower unit described by Bender was considered by Beurlen K. in 1963 as only one facies of the Riachuelo-Maruim Complex. In 1970, Schaller analyzed the unit again and segmenting it into four members: Angico, Taquari, Maruim and Aguilhada. Feijó, in 1994, classified the formation as a siliciclastic-carbonatic platform complex and divided it into the members: Angico, Taquari and Maruim, which is the classification currently used.

== Fossil content ==
=== Molluscs ===
Molluscs of the Riachuelo Formation
Genus	Species	Presence	Family	Images
Douvilleiceras	D. sergipensis D. euzebioi		Douvilleiceratidae	
Puzosia	P. rosarica P. brasiliana P. garajuana		Desmoceratidae	
Neokentroceras	N. tectorium		Brancoceratidae	
Elobiceras	E. lobitoense E. raymondi		Brancoceratidae	
Oxytropidoceras	O. buarquianum O. sergipensis O. involutum O. mauryae		Brancoceratidae	
Mortoniceras	M. sergipensis M. rostratum		Brancoceratidae	
Vectisites	V. simplex			
Eodouvilleiceras			Douvilleiceratidae	
Cheloniceras			Douvilleiceratidae	
Diadochoceras			Parahoplitidae	
Deshayesites			Deshayesitidae	
Anisoceras			Anisoceratidae	
Protanisoceras			Anisoceratidae	
Inoceramus	Indeterminate		Inoceramidae	
Neocomiceramus	N. anglicus		Inoceramidae	
Neithea	N. alpina N. coquandi N. hispanica		Pectinidae	
Linotrigonia			Trigoniidae	
Pleuromya			Pleuromyidae	
Pinna			Pinnidae	
Lopha			Ostreidae	
Turritella			Turritellidae	
Tylostoma			Tylostomatidae	
Natica			Naticidae	

=== Echinoderms ===
Echinoderms of the Riachuelo Formation
Genus	Species	Presence	Family	Images
Stereocidaris	S. branneri		Cidaridae	
Rhabdocidaris	R. brasiliensis		Rhabdocidaridae	
Salenia	S. sergipensis		Saleniidae	
Phymosoma	P. binexilis P. braziliensis		Phymosomatidae	
Orthopsis	O. australis		Orthopsidae	
Coenholectypus	C. pennanus		Holectypidae	
Conolypus	C. nertoanus			
Parapygus	P. aequalis		Echinolampadidae	6 to 9 is Parapygus antillarum.
Hemiaster	H. cranium		Hemiasteridae	
Temnocidaris			Cidaridae	
Douvillaster			Toxasteridae	
Leptosalenia			Saleniidae	
Phyllobrissus	P. humilis		Nucleolitidae	

=== Annelids ===
Annelids of the Riachuelo Formation
Genus	Species	Presence	Family	Images
Diploconcha	D. riachueloi D. scalata		Serpulidae	
Serpula	S. sergipensis		Serpulidae	

=== Crustaceans ===
Crustaceans of the Riachuelo Formation
Genus	Species	Presence	Family	Notes	Images
Palinura	Indeterminate	Angico Member	Lobster	Only posterior part of the body preserved	
Brazilomunida	B. brasiliensis		Galatheidae (squat lobster)		
Archaeopus	A. rathbunae		Ocypodidae		
Cyclothyreus	C. sergipensis		Dromioidea		
Maurimia	M. sergipensis		Dynomenidae		
Galalheites	G. brasiliensis	Maruim Member	Decapoda		
Reticulocosta	R. edrianae		Cytherettidae (ostracod)		
Aracajuia	A. benderi A. antiqua		An ostracod		
Harbinia	H. sinuata		An ostracod		
Sergipella	S. viviersae S. transatlantica S. grosdidieri	Taquari Member	An ostracod		
Praebythoceratina	P. amsittenensi		An ostracod		

=== Fishes ===
==== Cartilaginous fish ====
Cartilaginous fish of the Riachuelo Formation
Genus	Species	Presence	Description	Notes	Images

==== Ray-finned fish ====
Ray-finned fish of the Riachuelo Formation
Genus	Species	Presence	Description	Notes	Images
Cladocyclus	C. gardneri		Ichthyodectidae		
Neoproscinetes	N. penalvai		Pycnodontid		
Mercediella	M. riachuelensis		Pycnodontid fish	Originally described as Camposichthys riachuelensis	
Notelops	N. brama		Elopiform fish		
Rhacolepis	R. buccalis		Crossognathiform fish		
Tharrhias	T. araripis		Gonorynchiform fish		
Vinctifer	V. comptoni		Aspidorhynchiform fish		
Santanichthys	S. diasii	Taquari Member	Characiform fish		
Beurlenichthys	B. ouricuriensis		Clupeomorph fish		
Nolfia	N. riachuelensis	Taquari Member	Clupeoid fish		
