= Tejupeba House and the Chapel of the Colégio Sugar Plantation =

- Casa de Tejupeba e Capela do Engenho Colégio
- Location within Brazil

Religion
- Affiliation: Roman Catholic
- Rite: Roman

Location
- Municipality: Itaporanga d'Ajuda
- State: Sergipe
- Country: Brazil
- Coordinates: 11.067254613527325°S 37.265024185180664°W

National Historic Heritage of Brazil
- Designated: 1943
- Reference no.: 122

The Tejupeba House and the Chapel of the Colégio Sugar Plantation (Portuguese: Casa de Tejupeba e Capela do Engenho Colégio) is a plantation house and chapel in Itaporanga d'Ajuda, Sergipe, Brazil. The church dates to the Jesuit settlement of Santo Ignácio, located in present-day Itaporanga d'Ajuda, in 1575. It is one of many locations cited as the first Jesuits settlement in Portuguese Brazil, and one of many Jesuit slave-holding properties in Latin America. The house and chapel were listed as a historic structure by the National Institute of Historic and Artistic Heritage in 1943. The architectural historian Maria Berthilde Moura Filha stated that "of the remaining sugar plantations in Sergipe, this is the one with the oldest known references."

== History ==
The Jesuits arrived in Sergipe in 1575 led by Gaspar Lourenço and João Salônio. They founded the Chapel of Santa Luzia in present-day Santa Luzia do Itanhy, but it no longer exists. The Jesuits awarded two leagues of land in 1601 to educate indigenous people in the area in present-day Itaporanga d'Ajuda. The Jesuits constructed a residence for priests, a school, and chapel on an elevation that strategically overlooked the Vasa-Barris River. The Jesuits were expelled from Brazil in 1759, and the Tejupeba plantation, as well as its enslaved people, is listed in an inventory of Jesuit property that was subsequently auctioned. It was renamed the Colégio Plantation (Portuguese: Engenho Colégio) after the sale.

Nicola Vibonatti Mandarino, and Italian immigrant, bought the farm in the mid-1920s from the heirs of Antônio Dias Coelho and Mellore. Mandarino renamed it the Iolanda Estate (Portuguese: Fazenda Iolanda) in honor of one of his daughters. The Mandarino family restored the property in 1953, 1955, 2004, and 2006. A roof collapse severely damaged the interior elements of the chapel, including the main and side altars, balustrades, and wooden ornamentation.

== Chapel ==
The Chapel of the Colégio Sugar Plantation is an "imposing" structure. Its design strongly resembles that of the Chapel of the Nossa Senhora da Penha Sugar Plantation in Riacheulo, also in Sergipe. It has a central façade flanked by bell towers and a monumental baroque-style pediment. It has a singular stone framed portal at ground level with a curved lintel; the choir has three windows with the same design. The pediment has volutes and is surmounted by a cross, with an oculus in the tympanum. The chapel has two side bell towers with doors and windows similar to those on the façade. The belfries are hexagonal in shape, rather than the usual square-shaped belfries of Bahia and Sergipe. It has an oculus and arched bell windows. They hare topped by bulbous domes and crowned by spiers. The structure opens to a churchyard with a wooden cross.

=== Interior ===
The interior of the chapel has deteriorated and lacks its original furnishing. The chancel is separated from the nave by a small altar railing of balusters. There are side altars to either side of the chancel arch. The nave has six tribunes with wooden railings and two pulpits, all in wood. The baptismal font is of carved limestone. The choir has a wooden railing. The chapel also has an oratory. The side aisles open onto the exterior through arcades. They are now partially faced with masonry, a feature found in other chapels in Sergipe, notably the Chapel of the Nossa Senhora da Penha Sugar Plantation in Riachuelo. Some of the arcades have wood and glass fanlights. The nave has numerous headstones of individuals related to the history of Sergipe, including those of the Dias Coelho e Mello families. They include the remains of Antônio Dias Coelho de Melo, the Baron of Estância.

== Plantation house ==
The plantation house (casa grande) is constructed of taipa, or rammed earth. It has two floors, with three doors with curved lintels on the lower level. The porch is supported by wooden consoles. The central room of the home is on the upper level, a feature of most plantation houses in Brazil, and rises above roof level with windows. The upper floor has a wooden balcony on one side overlooking a small garden. The façade has a full-length wooden balcony and railings with "rammed-earth panels".

== Protected status ==
The Tejupeba House and the Chapel of the Colégio Sugar Plantation was listed as a historic structure by the National Institute of Historic and Artistic Heritage in 1943. The structure was registered under the Book of Historical Works, Inscription 289. The directive is dated May 21, 1943.

== Access ==
The church and farmhouse are on private property and may not be visited. In 2015 it belonged to the Mandarino family of Nova Descoberta, Sergipe.
