= Astiericeras =

Astiericeras Temporal range: Albian

Scientific classification
- Domain: Eukaryota
- Kingdom: Animalia
- Phylum: Mollusca
- Class: Cephalopoda
- Subclass: †Ammonoidea
- Order: †Ammonitida
- Suborder: †Ancyloceratina
- Family: †Douvilleiceratidae
- Subfamily: †Douvilleiceratinae
- Genus: †Astiericeras; Parona & Bonarelli. 1896

Astiericeras is an ammonite from the Lower Cretaceous, the shell of which is evolute, stout; outer whorl with strong, well spaced, transverse ribs that cross smoothly over the broad venter; early whorls with lateral tubercles. The outer, mature whorl separates from the coil but hooks back quickly, referred to as a heteromorph.

Astiericeras is generally considered to be a douvillieceratid. However, according to W. J. Kennedy, the genus may instead be a scaphitoid.
