= Chapel of the Nossa Senhora da Penha Sugar Plantation =

Roman Catholic church in Sergipe, Brazil

- Capela do Engenho Nossa Senhora da Penha
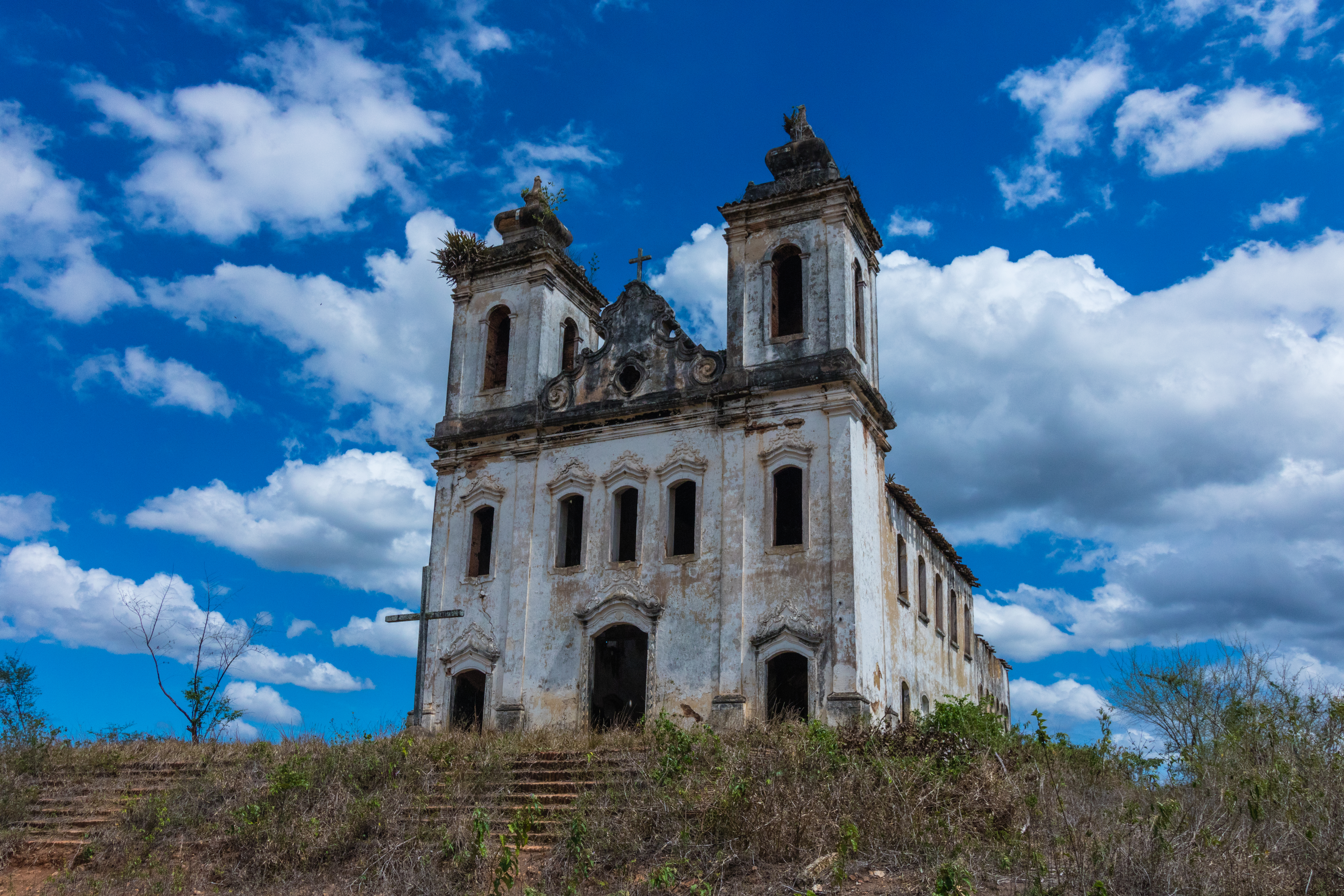
- Chapel of the Nossa Senhora da Penha Sugar Plantation, Riachuelo

- Location of the Chapel of the Nossa Senhora da Penha Sugar Plantation in Brazil

Religion
- Affiliation: Catholic
- Rite: Roman Rite
- Status: Abandoned

Location
- Municipality: Riachuelo
- State: Sergipe
- Country: Brazil
- Interactive map of Chapel of the Nossa Senhora da Penha Sugar Plantation
- Coordinates: 10°42′25.55″S 37°13′50.65″W

Architecture
- Style: Baroque
- Direction of façade: North

National Historic Heritage of Brazil
- Designated: 1943
- Reference no.: 208-T

The Chapel of the Nossa Senhora da Penha Sugar Plantation (Portuguese: Capela do Engenho Nossa Senhora da Penha) is an 18th-century Roman Catholic church in the city of Riachuelo, Sergipe, Brazil. It is located approximately 39 kilometres (24 mi) from the state capital of Aracaju at the border of the municipalities of Riachuelo and Malhador. It was built as part of the Nossa Senhora da Penha Sugar Plantation and was listed as a historic structure by National Institute of Historic and Artistic Heritage (IPHAN) in 1943. It has fallen into an advanced state of neglect and decay and is considered abandoned.

== History ==
The chapel is the sole remaining structure of the Nossa Senhora da Penha Sugar Plantation. The plantation was founded during the period of expansion of sugar cane production in Sergipe. Plantations were built along the Cotinguiba and Sergipe rivers and African slaves were brought to the state via Bahia. A deed dated 1780 indicated that the plantation belonged to Ventura Rabelo Leite de Sampaio; he ordered the construction of a chapel on the property in 1795. His son completed construction on the chapel and it was consecrated by the Archdiocese of Aracaju in 1800. The chapel passed into the hands of the Leite Franco Brotherhood by the early 20th century, and the order was using the chapel at the time of its survey by IPHAN in 1943.

== Structure ==
=== Exterior ===
The Chapel of the Nossa Senhora da Penha Sugar Plantation was built on a grand scale rare among plantation chapels in the Northeast Region of Brazil. The façade of the church faces north, and has three large doors at its base with five choir windows above. The choir windows have a curved lintel and are topped by decorative scrollwork in stone. It is framed by two towers, corresponding to the interior aisles, and each topped by a decorative dome and crowned by bulbous pinnacles. Windows in the towers likewise are topped by decorative stonework. The side facade has ripped curved windows, padded door and round glasses. The staircase to the church is made of brick. In design, it is similar to the Chapel of the Colégio Sugar Plantation in Itaporanga d'Ajuda.

=== Interior ===
The nave of the chapel has two side aisles with walls originally covered in tile. The nave faces a chancel with two sacristies, both with distinct and lower roofs than that of the chancel. The main altar features a canopy with Corinthian columns with decorative applique. Carved and gilded woodwork typical of the Northeast covered the high and side altars, pulpits, and tribunes. The corner altars had a simple design.

== Protected status ==
The Chapel of the Nossa Senhora da Penha Sugar Plantation was listed as a historic structure by the National Institute of Historic and Artistic Heritage in 1943. Both the structure and its contents were included in the IPHAN directive, which include Book of Historical Works, Inscription 208 and Book of Fine Arts, Inscription 273-A. Both directives are dated March 3, 1943.

== Condition ==
As of April 2024, the chapel was in an advanced state of neglect, vandalism, and decay. Photographs of the chapel in 1943, at the time it received a SPHAN (the predecessor organization of IPHAN) survey, show the structure intact and its registration at SPHAN describe an "archive and interior elements". Photographs from 1983 show the structure degraded but with exterior elements such as doors and a roof intact. News reports from 2016 show the building fully abandoned, robbed of its contents, and vandalized. The chapel now lacks an access road, the absence of doors and a functional roof leave it open to the elements, and the chapel site is covered in shrubbery. The contents and decorative elements of the interior have been stolen in their entirety; tiling from the interior is missing and only small patches remain on its exterior. A large portion of the brick wall at a side elevation of the chapel has collapsed at the base.

== See also ==
- Catholic Church in Brazil
