= Parahoplitinae =

Scientific classification
- Kingdom: Animalia
- Phylum: Mollusca
- Class: Cephalopoda
- Subclass: †Ammonoidea
- Order: †Ammonitida
- Suborder: †Ancyloceratina
- Family: †Parahoplitidae
- Subfamily: †Parahoplitinae; Spath 1922

Genera
- Kazanskyella Stoyanow, 1949; Oshimaceras Obata and Futakami, 1992; Parahoplites Anthula, 1900; Quitmanites Scott, 1940; Sinzowiella Stoyanow, 1949; Stoyanowiceras Etayo-Serna, 1979

Extinct subfamily of molluscs

Parahoplitinae is an extinct subfamily of cephalopods belonging to the Ammonite family Parahoplitidae.
