= Río Negro, Chile =

Río Negro
- City and Commune
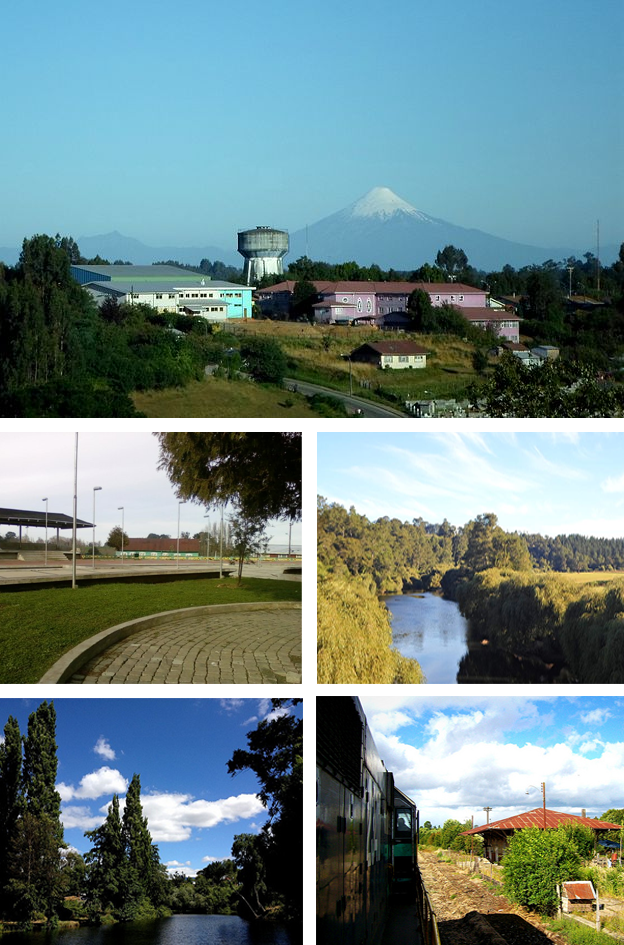
- Top: Volcán Osorno, Middle left: Plaza de Armas, Middle right: Negro River seen from Chapaco Bridge, Bottom left: Locality of La Toma Bottom right: Remains of the Río Negro-Osorno railroad

- Location of Río Negro commune in Los Lagos Region Location in Chile
- Coordinates (city): 40°47′S 73°12′W
- Country: Chile
- Region: Los Lagos
- Province: Osorno Province
- Founded: March 12, 1896

Government
  - Type: Municipality
  - Alcalde: Carlos Schwalm Urzúa (RN)

Area
  - Total: 1,265.7 km^{2} (488.7 sq mi)

Population (2002 Census)
  - Total: 14,732
  - Density: 11.639/km^{2} (30.146/sq mi)
  - Urban: 6,583
  - Rural: 8,149
- Demonym: Rionegrino

Sex
  - Men: 7,528
  - Women: 7,204
- Time zone: UTC−4 (CLT)
  - Summer (DST): UTC−3 (CLST)
- Area code: 56 + 64
- Climate: Cfb
- Website: Municipality of Rio Negro

Río Negro (Spanish pronunciation: [ˈri.o ˈneɣɾo], English: Black River) is a Chilean city and commune in Osorno Province, Los Lagos Region. The city is located 38 km south of Osorno and 6 km west of Route 5. It has an area of 1,266 km² and a population of 14,732 inhabitants (7,204 women and 7,528 men according to census 2002).

The commune is bordered on the north by Osorno and San Juan de la Costa, on the east by Puerto Octay, on the west by the Pacific Ocean, and on the south by Purranque.

Cóndor Beach, Coastal zone of Río Negro, on the Pacific Ocean

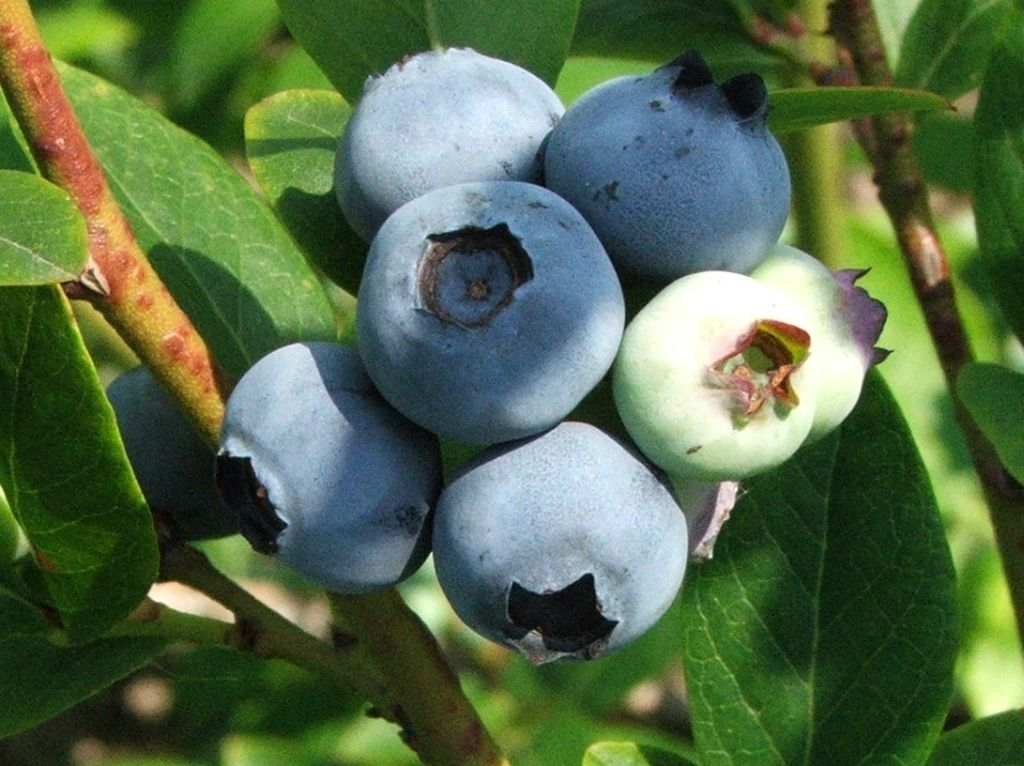
Río Negro exports Blueberries mainly

== History ==
In the 19th century, the commune was a property located between Chahuilco and Purranque called Curileufu by the Huilliche. The town was founded on lands donated by Jose Miguel Alderete in the year 1896. The first alcalde (mayor) was Pedro González.

== Demographics ==
Historical population
Year	Pop.	±% p.a.
1875	824	—
1885	1,088	+2.82%
1895	1,936	+5.93%
1907	3,741	+5.64%
1920	6,914	+4.84%
1930	8,636	+2.25%
1940	13,667	+4.70%
1952	14,296	+0.38%
1970	15,834	+0.57%
1982	16,983	+0.59%
1992	16,026	−0.58%
2002	14,732	−0.84%
2017	14,085	−0.30%
2024	13,874	−0.22%
Source: "Censo de Población y Vivienda". National Statistics Institute.

According to the 2002 census of the National Statistics Institute, Río Negro spans an area of 1,265.7 km^{2} (489 sq mi) and has 14,732 inhabitants (7,528 men and 7,204 women). Of these, 6,583 (44.7%) lived in urban areas and 8,149 (55.3%) in rural areas. The population fell by 8.1% (1294 persons) between the 1992 and 2002 censuses.

== Administration ==
As a commune, Río Negro is a third-level administrative division of Chile administered by a municipal council, headed by an alcalde who is directly elected every four years. The 2008-2012 alcalde is Carlos Schwalm Urzúa (RN). The council has the following members:

- Carlos Kusch (UDI)
- Pedro Carreño (PDC)
- Jaime Ramos (Ind.-PS)
- Patricio Alvarado (Ind.-RN)
- Juan Saldivia Quintullanca (Ind.-PRI)
- Rosiel del Río (Ind.-UDI)

Within the electoral divisions of Chile, Río Negro is represented in the Chamber of Deputies by Fidel Espinoza (PS) and Carlos Recondo (UDI) as part of the 56th electoral district, together with Puyehue, Purranque, Puerto Octay, Fresia, Frutillar, Llanquihue, Puerto Varas and Los Muermos. The commune is represented in the Senate by Camilo Escalona Medina (PS) and Carlos Kuschel Silva (RN) as part of the 17th senatorial constituency (Los Lagos Region).

== Localities and sectors ==
- Riachuelo
- Chifin
- Huellelhue Beach
- Huilma
- Millantué
- Chan-Chan
- Chahuilco
- Ñancuan
- Tres Esteros
- Río Blanco
- El Bolsón

== Climate ==
The climate is oceanic (Köppen: Cfb), with average temperatures of 11.4 °C.
