= Cotinguiba Formation =

Geological formation in Brazil

- Stratigraphic range: Late Cretaceous, ~Cenomanian–Coniacian
- Type: Geological formation
- Sub-units: Aracaju and Sapucari Members
- Underlies: Calumbi Formation
- Overlies: Riachuelo Formation
- Thickness: from 200 metres (656 ft) up

Location
- Region: Sergipe-Alagoas Basin of Northeastern Brazil
- Country: Brazil
- Extent: 200 kilometres (120 mi)

The Cotinguiba Formation is a geologic formation of Late Cretaceous (Cenomanian to Coniacian) age in the northeastern Brazil's Sergipe-Alagoas Basin. The Formation is composed of carbonates with clastic intercalations, moreover, the two members dividing it, the Sapucari and Aracaju members, are defined by the proportion of said carbonates. It also possesses a rich macroinvertebrate fauna, of which stands out its bivalve mollucs, gastropods, ammonites, as well as echinoderms and crustaceans.

== Description ==
On average, the Cotinguiba Formation had a thickness of around 200 meters, although in some sections over 1000 meters have been measured. It is formed by carbonates with clastic intercalations, and it is also divided into two members, the Aracaju and Sapucaru Members. Said members are defined by the proportions of these carbonates within them. It is 200 km long and 5–10 km wide parallel to the coast. It is mainly composed by limestone–marlstone couplets, with sandstones, coquinas and limestone breccias being included in some places. These sediments were largely produced by algae and bioeroders on a shallow-water ramp. The origin of such rocks has been related with the seasonal oscillations of phytoplankton productivity, mud content and calcium production. The Turonian laminated carbonates of the Sergipe Basin have been associated with orbital-climatic-driven cycles.

The Cotinguiba Formation formed as result of a transgressive event which ended in the drowning of the shallow platform of the Riachuelo Formation.

== History ==
Various works have discussed the paleontology of the Sergipe-Alagoas Basin, where the Cotinguiba Formation is found. Among the first works on the formation, are highlighted those by Dr. C. A. White in 1887 and Maury in 1936, which described the various species of ammonites, bivalves, gastropods and equinoderms.

The first biochronostratigraphic study based on ammonites was done by G. Beurlen in 1970, followed by others like Reyment and Bengtson.

== Fossil contents ==
Although not as abundant as the Riachuelo Formation fauna that precedes it, the Cotinguiba Formation contains a very diversified macrofauna, including ammonites and inoceramid bivalves.

=== Molluscs ===
Molluscs of the Cotinguiba Formation
| Genus | Species | Description | Image |
|---|---|---|---|
| Solgerites | S. armatus | An Collignoniceratidae ammonite | |
| Barroisiceras | B. onilahyense | An Collignoniceratidae ammonite | Collignoniceratidae - Barroisiceras species |
| Prionocyclus | P. germari | An Collignoniceratidae ammonite | Prionocyclus wyomingensis (fossil ammonite) (Frontier Formation, Upper Cretaceous, ~92 Ma; Wyoming, USA) |
| Subprionocyclus | | An Collignoniceratidae ammonite | |
| Mammites | M. nodosoides | An Acanthoceratidae ammonite | Acanthoceratidae - Mammites nodosoides |
| Watinoceras | W. amudariense | An Acanthoceratidae ammonite | Watinoceras coloradoense J07836 |
| Pseudotissotia | P. nigerienses | An Pseudotissotiidae ammonite | |
| Vascoceras | V. harttii | An Vascoceratidae ammonite | Vascoceratidae - Vascoceras cauvini |
| Aporrhais | A. dutrugei A. subgibbosus | A Aporrhaidae gastropod | Aporrhais pesgallinae 01 |
| Avellana | | A Ringiculidae gastropod | |
| Drepanocheilus | | A Aporrhaidae gastropod | |
| Epitonium | | A Epitoniidae gastropod | Epitonium clathrum |
| Fasciolaria | | A Fasciolariidae gastropod | Fasciolaria tulipaProfils |
