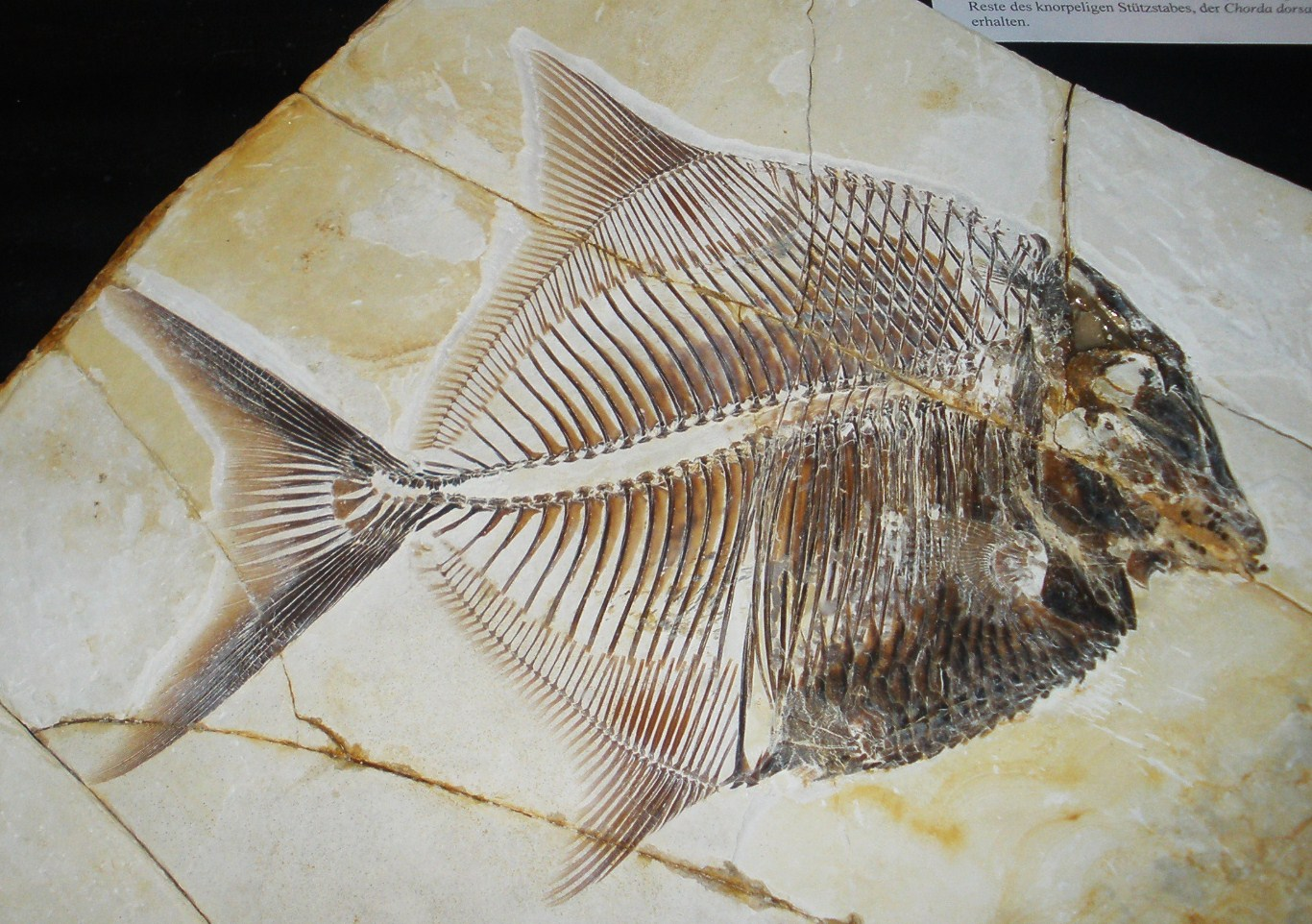
- Proscinetes cf elegans

Scientific classification
- Domain: Eukaryota
- Kingdom: Animalia
- Phylum: Chordata
- Class: Actinopterygii
- Order: †Pycnodontiformes
- Family: †Pycnodontidae
- Subfamily: †Proscinetinae
- Genus: †Proscinetes; Gistel, 1848

Species
- P. elegans; P. bernardi; P. itieri; P. radiatus

Synonyms
- Microdon Agassiz (1833); Polypsephis Hay (1899)

= Proscinetes =

Proscinetes Temporal range: Tithonian ~149–145 Ma

Extinct genus of fishes

Proscinetes is an extinct genus of prehistoric pycnodontiform ray-finned fish from the Jurassic.

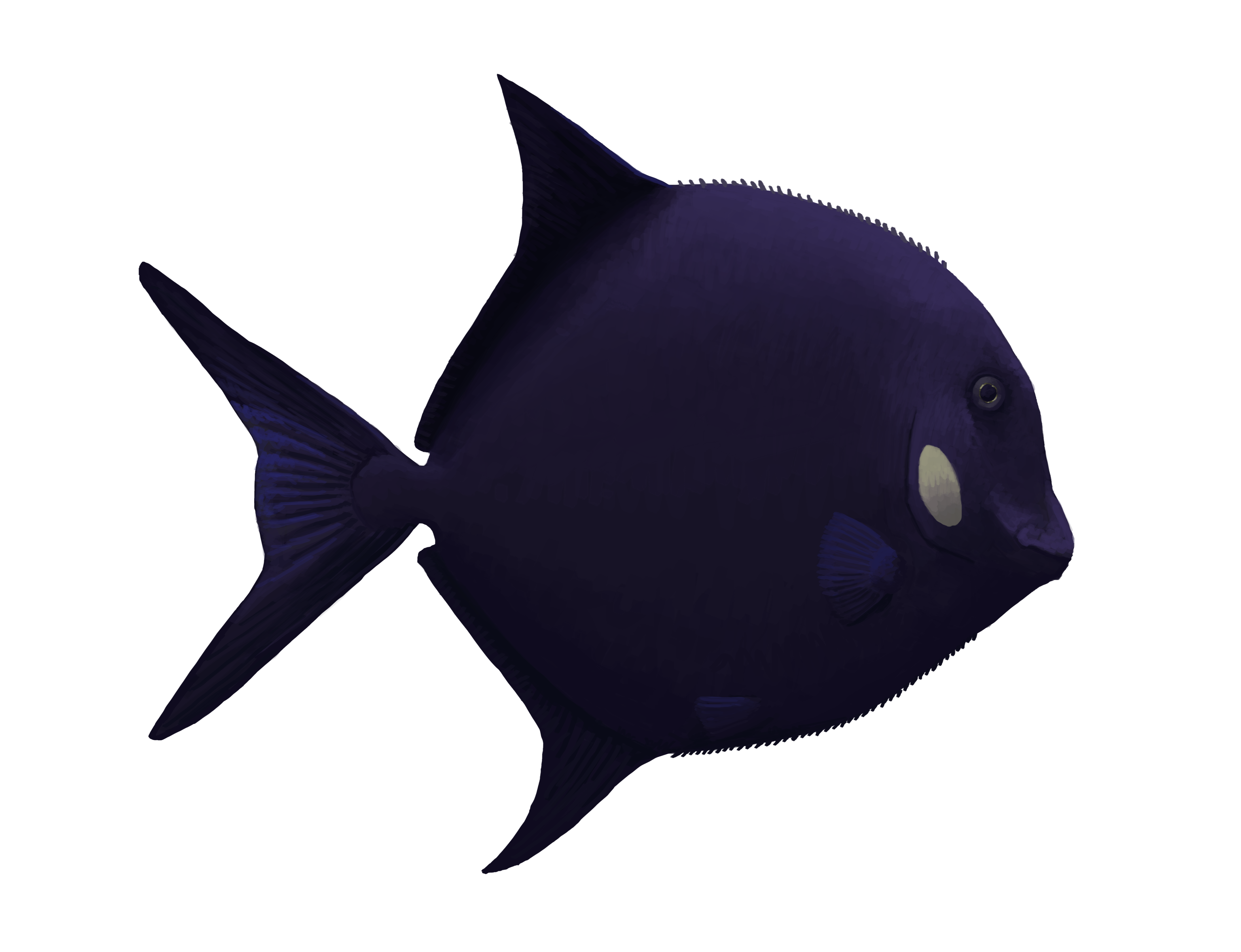
Life reconstruction of Proscinetes elegans

Proscinetes is the type genus to the subfamily Proscinetinae, whose only other known members are Neoproscinetes, Turbomesodon, Turboscinetes and Thiollierepycnodus.

== Distribution ==
Fossils of the P. elegans and P. bernardi are both found in Southern Germany and in Cerin, France. P. itieri is also found in Cerin, and P. radiatus is found in Southern England.

== See also ==
- Prehistoric fish
- List of prehistoric bony fish
