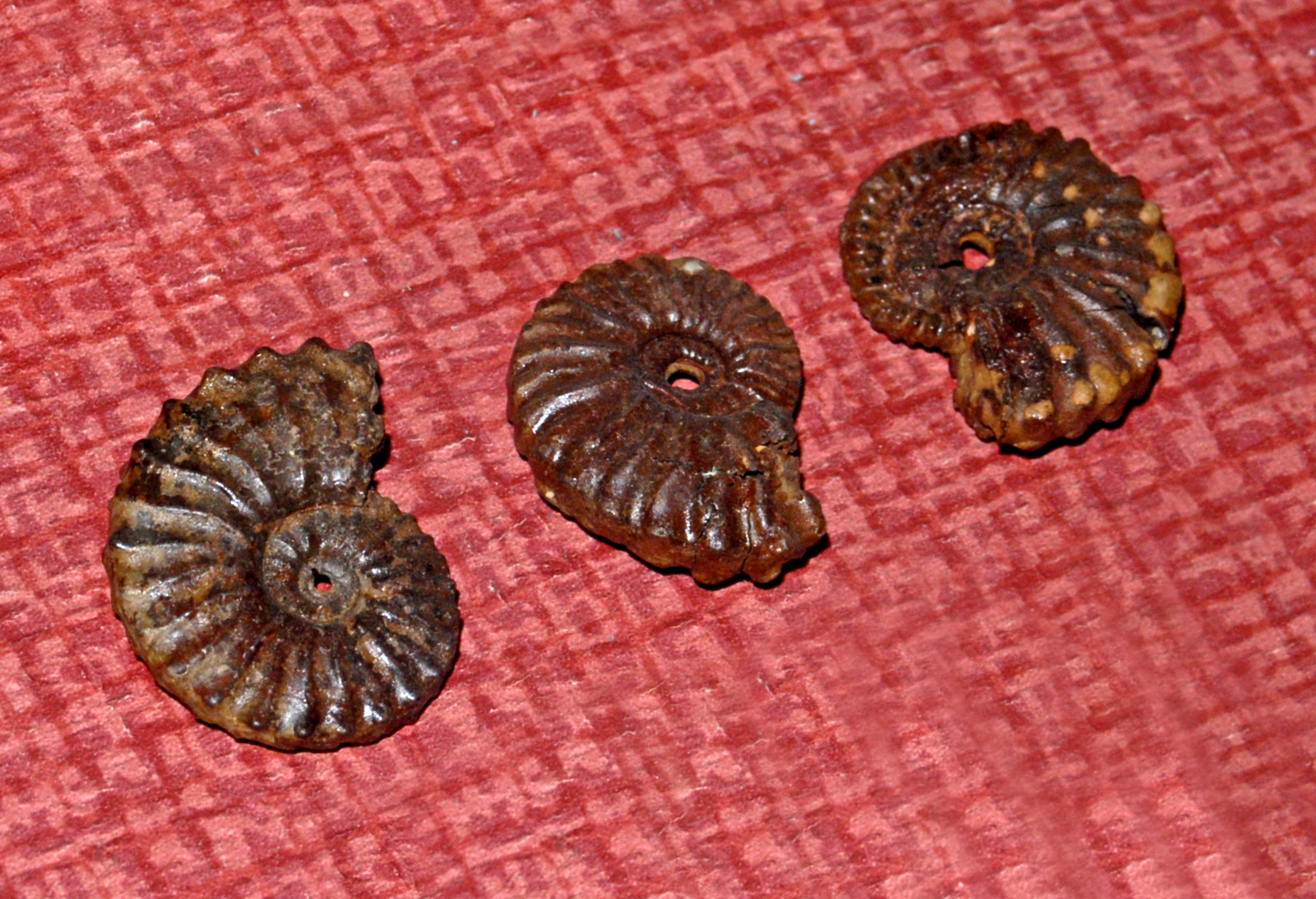
- Dufrenoyia dufrenoyi from France

Scientific classification
- Domain: Eukaryota
- Kingdom: Animalia
- Phylum: Mollusca
- Class: Cephalopoda
- Subclass: †Ammonoidea
- Order: †Ammonitida
- Suborder: †Ancyloceratina
- Family: †Parahoplitidae
- Subfamily: †Deshayesitinae
- Genus: †Dufrenoyia; Kilian and Reboul, 1915

= Dufrenoyia =

Dufrenoyia Temporal range: Cretaceous, 125.45–112.6 Ma

Genus of molluscs (fossil)

Dufrenoyia is an extinct genus of Cretaceous ammonites included in the family Parahoplitidae. These fast-moving nektonic carnivores lived in the Cretaceous period (Aptian age). The type species of the genus is Ammonites dufrenoyi.

== Species ==
- Dufrenoyia codazziana Karsten, 1886
- Dufrenoyia dufrenoyi d'Orbigny, 1840
- Dufrenoyia furcata Sowerby, 1836
- Dufrenoyia justinae Hill, 1893

== Distribution ==
Fossils of species within this genus have been found in the Cretaceous sediments of Germany, Mexico, Morocco, Spain, the United Kingdom, United States, Colombia and Venezuela.
