= Sergipe-Alagoas Basin =

- "Bacia de Sergipe-Alagoas"
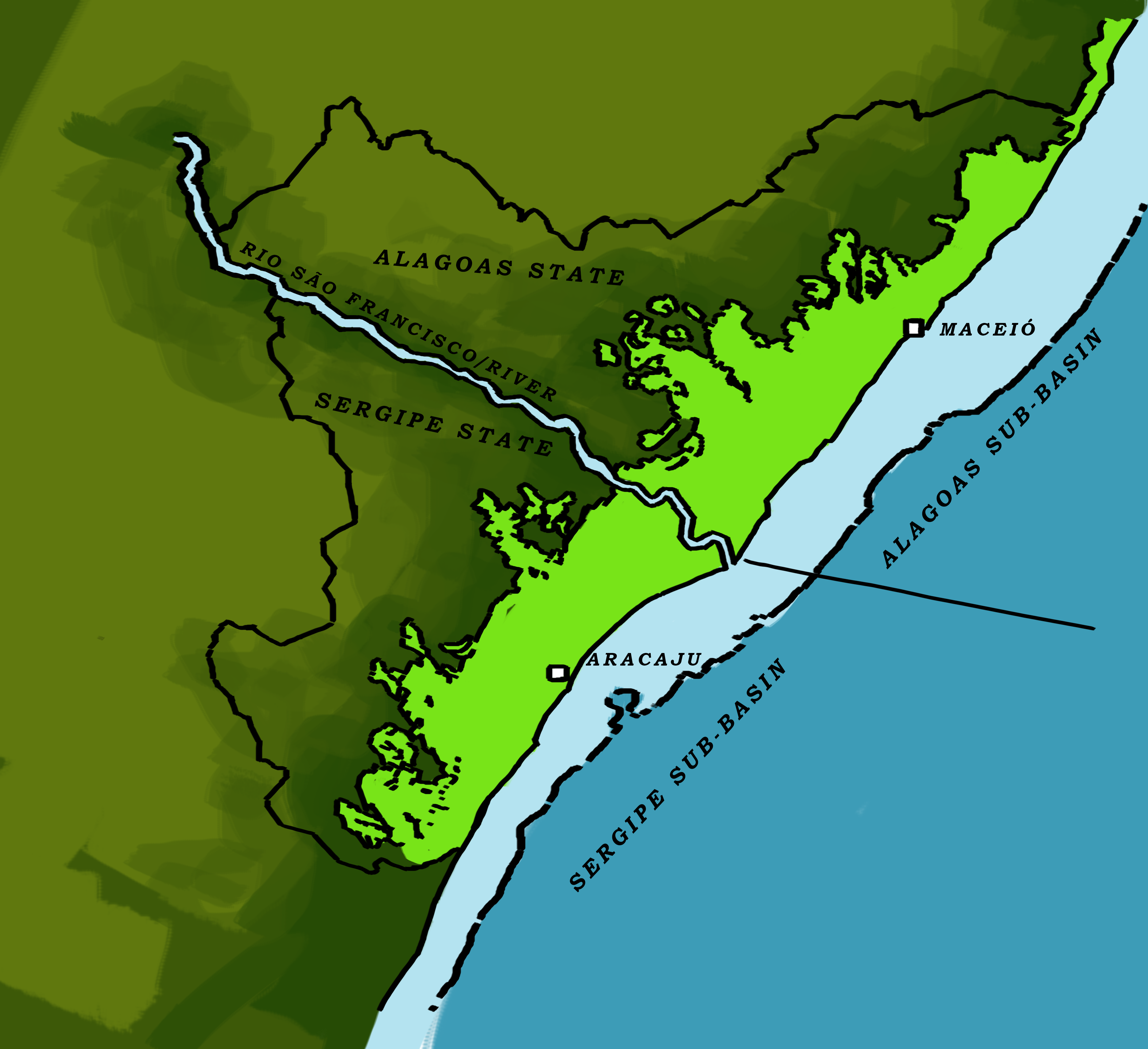

- Location within Brazil
- Coordinates: 9°11′13″S 37°35′30″W
- Etymology: Sergipe and Alagoas
- Location: South America
- Region: Northeast
- Country: Brazil
- States: Sergipe, Alagoas, Pernambuco

Characteristics
- On/Offshore: onshore and offshore
- Boundaries: Pernambuco Lineament & Itapuã Fault
- Area: ~20,000 km^{2} (7,700 sq mi) to ~50,000 km^{2} (19,000 sq mi)

Geology
- Basin type: Rift basin
- Plate: South American
- Orogeny: Break-up of Gondwana
- Age: Proterozoic-Recent
- Stratigraphy: Stratigraphy

The Sergipe-Alagoas Basin is a continental margin basin in the Sergipe and Alagoas states of northeastern Brazil, about 20 to 50 kilometres wide onshore, but with its widest extension offshore, more precisely 13,000 km^{2} onshore and 40,000 km^{2} offshore. In general, "Sergipe-Alagoas Basin" refers to the Sergipe and Alagoas sub-basins, but it also consists of the Jacuípe and Cabo sub-basins. Studies of the basin's geology date back to the first half of the 19th century, when J. Henderson in 1821 published preliminary notes on the region's geology.

The basin formed during the opening of the South Atlantic Ocean in the Late Jurassic and Cretaceous periods alongside other basins in the Brazilian coast.

== History ==
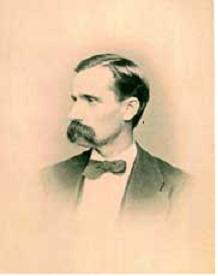
Photo of Charles Frederick Hartt.

Studies of the basin's geology date back to the first half of the 19th century, when J. Henderson in 1821 published preliminary notes on the region's geology, but the first geological and paleontological surveys were carried out in 1865–1866 by the Canadian naturalist Charles Frederick Hartt, a participant of the Thayer Expedition. The results of this expedition were published in the book “Geology and Physical Geography of Brazil” from 1870, where it was described fossils of ammonites and a gastropod from the municipalities of Maruim and Larangeiras. With the Commissão Geológica do Império do Brazil, an expedition from 1875 and 1878 directed by Hartt, important studies were carried by the American palaeontologist Charles A. White, describing ammonites, bivalves, gastropods and echinoids. John Casper Branner published in 1890 a report on the Sergipe-Alagoas Basin about the localities of White's materials.

Ralph Sopper published in 1914 the first geological map of the basin, but a more detailed map was published in 1924 by the “Serviço Geológico e Mineralógico do Brasil”.

Research of the Basin received strong motivation when search for petroleum begun in the 1940s, resulting in detailed maps and new fossil collections. Since 1953, the Brazilian Petroleum Company, PETROBRAS, produced various reports with the aim of improving knowledge of the region during the search for petroleum. Biostratigraphic studies by Karl Beurlen established a zonation of the Aptian-Albian Riachuelo Formation based on ammonites. He also published a number of subsequent studies from 1961 to 1968.

== Geological History ==
The geological evolution of the basin represents 5 tectonic stages: syneclise, pre-rift, rift, transitional and drift.

1) Syneclise stage - Late Carboniferous to Early Permian - It is represented by the Batinga Formation, which probably was of glacial origin, which comprises siliciclastic rocks, and the Aracaré Formation, comprising eolian sandstones, shales and lacustrine algal laminites.

2) Pre-rift stage - Late Jurassic - Represented by the Candeeiro Formation, Bananeiras Formation and Serraria Formation, when crustal uplift resulted in a series of depressions which were filled by fluvial and lacustrine sediments.

3) Rift stage - Early Cretaceous - Represented by the Rio Pitanga Formation, Penedo Formation, Barra de Itiúba Formation and Coqueiro Seco Formation, increasing tectonism led to the formation of a rift-valley, the newly created rift was filled by an alluvial-fluvial-deltaic system.

4) Transitional stage - Early Aptian - Represented by the Muribeca Formation and Maceió Formation, the transitional stage began when the first marine sediments were deposited.

5) Drift stage - Early to mid Albian - Represented by the Riachuelo Formation, begun in the Albian, even though marine regime was established already in the late Aptian. Events during the Cenomanian and early Turonian cause the drowning of the Riachuelo platform system.

== Formations ==
=== The Basement ===
Proterozoic (possibly Cambrian) in origin. Sub-basin Sergipe is composed of metamorphic rocks. Metasediments also occur, possibly of Cambrian origin. Sub-basin Alagoas is composed by granitic rocks from the Pernambuco-Alagoas Massif.

=== Estância Formation ===
Cambrian in origin. Composed by red sandstones and siltstones with mica schists and conglomerate lenses. The depositional environment is thought to have been braided and meandering fluvial system.

The formation was named after the town of Estância in southern Sergipe.

=== Batinga Formation ===
Late Carboniferous to Early Permian in origin. The siliciclastic rocks which compose the formation where formed under a glacio-marine environment.

It is divided into 3 member: The Mulungu, Atalaia and Boaciaca members. The Mulungu Member is represented by conglomerates and diamictites, the Atalaia Member consists of immature coarse-grained sandstones and the Boacica Member is composed by laminated siltstones, sandstones and conglomerates deposited by deltaic fans.

The formation was named after he village of Batinga in the northwestern part of the Sergipe Sub-basin.

=== Aracaré Formation ===
Permian in origin. Composed by mature coarse-grained sandstones with large cross-stratification sets, associated with silicified oolitic-oncolitic calcarenites, algal mats and stromatolites. The original surroundings where suggested to have been a warm and dry desertic environment and shore bordering a large lake.

The name Aracaré originates from the Aracaré Hill, 2 km south of the town of Neópolis.

=== Candeeiro Formation ===
Late Jurassic in origin. Composed of fine to medium-grained sandstones, possibly formed in a braided fluvial system. The formation is not exposed and no fossils have been found.

It was named after the Candeeiro-01 well (1-CO-1-AL) in Alagoas.

=== Bananeiras Formation ===
Late Jurassic in origin. Composed by red shales deposited in a lacustrine environment. Fossils of non-marine ostracods, such as Bisulcocypris pricei and Darwinula aff. oblonga.

The formation was named after the village of Bananeiras in Sergipe.

=== Serraria Formation ===
Late Jurassic to Early Cretaceous in origin. Composed by medium to coarse-grained sandstones with tabular and channelled cross-stratification. The sediments were deposited by a braided fluvial system, locally with eolian reworking. Large conifer trunks of the species Agathoxylon benderi where found in the formation's sandstones.

It was named after the small village of Serraria in southern Alagoas.

=== Feliz Deserto Formation ===
Berriasian to Valanginian in origin. Its fossil record consists of gastropods, bivalve molluscs, remains of Lepidotes fish, crocodylomorph teeth and the oldest occurrences of Spinosauridae in South America.

=== Barra de Itiúba Formation ===
Early Cretaceous in origin. It is composed by succession of shales and fine-grained sandstones that interfingers laterally with the Penedo Formation. The formation was probably deposited by a deltaic system in a lacustrine environment. Much of the fossils there are of ostracods, like Cypridea and Paracypridea.

The formation was named after the Barra de Itiúba village in Alagoas.

=== Penedo Formation ===
Early Cretaceous. Composed of coarse to medium-grained sandstones deposited in a fluvial-deltaic environment subject to eolian reworking. The only fossils found in the formation are of ostracods.

Its name derives from the town of Penedo on the Rio São Francisco in Alagoas.

=== Rio Pitanga Formation ===
Hauterivian to early Aptian in origin. Composed of coarse-grained polymictic and alluvial conglomerates. No fossils have been found.

The name derives from the Rio Pitanga-01 well (1-RP-1-SE) in Sergipe.

=== Coqueiro Seco Formation ===
Lower Cretaceous in origin. Consists of fine to coarse- grained sandstones and mudstones deposited in a fluvio- deltaic-lacustrine environment. Fossils are poorly preserved but abundant, specially in the Morro do Chaves Member.

The name derives from the Coqueiro Seco-01 well in Alagoas. It replaces the older name, Jiquiá Formation.

=== Ponta Verde Formation ===
Early Aptian in origin. It consists of characteristic grey to green shales formed during a widespread transgression in the area. Fossils are not common in the formation, however an abundance of the pollen Afropollis sp. is a characteristic feature of Ponta Verde.

It is named after the Ponta Verde-01 well near Maceió.

=== Muribeca Formation ===
Late Aptian in origin. The Formation is formed by 3 members, the Carmópolis, Ibura and Oiterinhos members. The Carmópolis Member is formed by sandstones with minor intercalations of siltstones and shales and polymictic conglomerates. The Ibura Member contains a succession of halite, sylvinite and carnallite. The Oiteirinhos Member has an alternation of laminated calcilutites and shales. Fossils found in the formation include foraminifers, palynomorphs, ostracods, conchostraceans and fish remains.

The name Muribeca derives from the town of Muribeca in northern Sergipe, where was found rocks thought to be from this formation. In reality, the rocks are now assigned to the Rio Pitanga Formation, and the Muribeca Formation is not exposed at all.

=== Maceió Formation ===
Late Aptian in origin, contemporary with Muribeca. Composed of coarse to fine-grained sandstones, with minor shale intercalations, and conglomerates. Common fossils in this in the shales are of conchostraceans and fish.

It's named after the capital of Alagoas, Maceió.

=== Poção Formation ===
Early Aptian to Late Aptian in origin. Composed of conglomerates and coarse-grained arkoses.

=== Riachuelo Formation ===
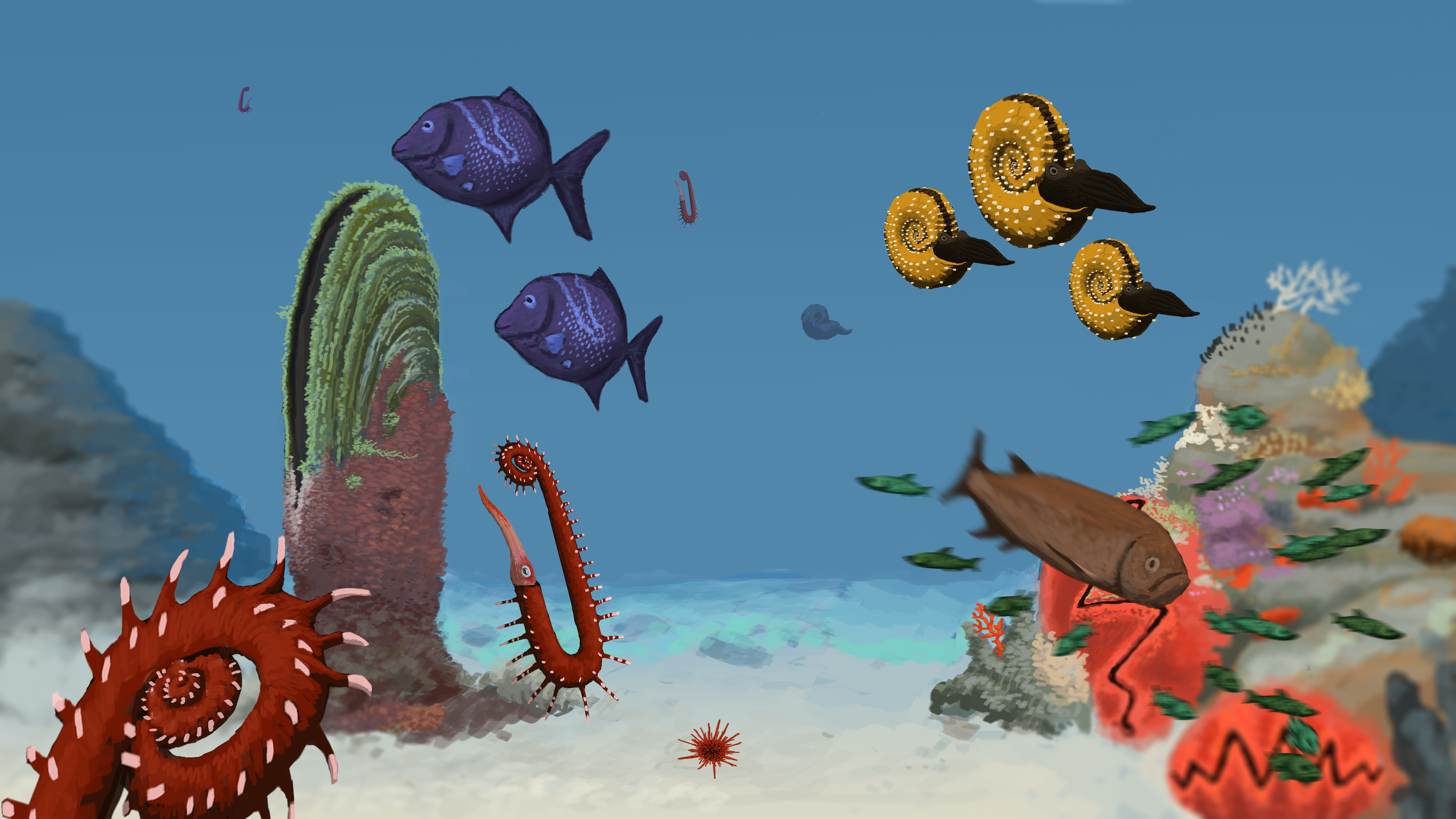
Paleoart reconstruction of the Riachuelo Formation.

Late Aptian to Early Cenomanian in origin. The formation is formed by 3 members, the Angico, Maruim and Taquari. The Angico member is composed by siliciclastic conglomerates and sandstones and the Taquari Member is composed of a cyclic alternation of marls and shales. Fossils of ammonites are bountiful in this formation, alongside fossils of other molluscs and fish.

The Formation was named after the municipality of Riachuelo.

=== Cotinguiba Formation ===
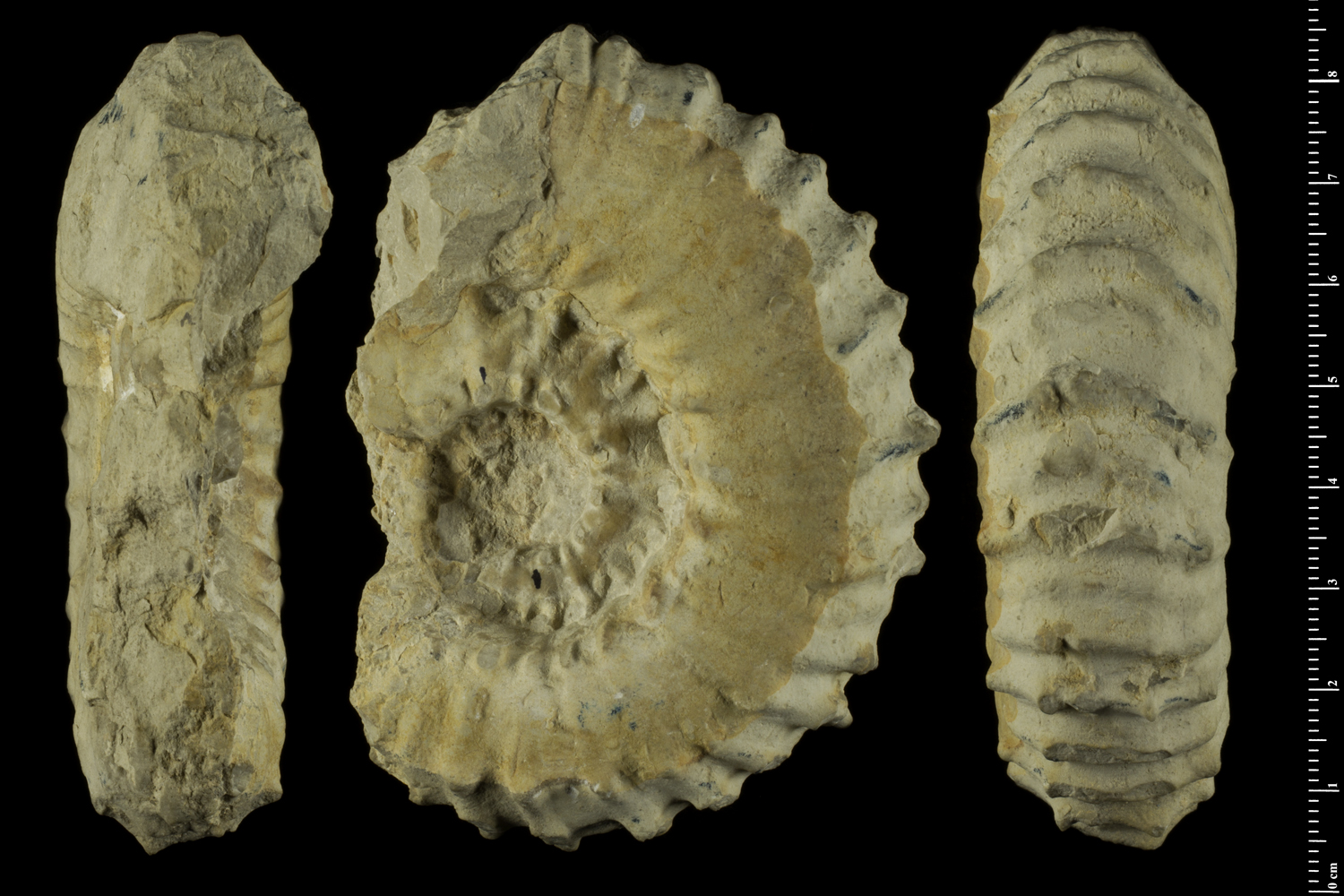
Watinoceras fossil from Tunisia. This genus of ammnonite was found in the Cotinguiba Formation.

Early Cenomanian to Middle Coniacian in origin. The formation consists of the Sapucari and Aracaju members, the Sapucari Member is formed of calcilutites and subordinately carbonate breccias that grade basinward onto the shales of the Aracaju Member. Although they are not as abundant as the Riachuelo Formation, the fossils of this formation are diverse, including ammonites and inoceramids.

It was named after a vast valley the cuts the formation.

=== Calumbi Formation ===
Santonian to Recent in origin. Formed by siltstones and olive-green shales and pale-yellow sandstones. The formation is generally poor on fossil remains, although some outcrops are abundant.

The name derives from the small village of Calumbi west of Aracaju.

=== Marituba Formation ===
Tertiary to Recent in origin. Composed mostly of medium to coarse sandstones, close to the coast. No fossils have been found in this formation yet.

The name derives from the village of Marituba in Alagoas.

=== Mosqueiro Formation ===
Composed mostly of bioclastic calcarenites. Most common fossils are fragments of molluscs and foraminifers.

The name comes from the village of Mosqueiro in Sergipe.

=== Barreiras Group ===
The Sergipe-Alagoas Basin is covered by wide areas of rock coming from this unit. It is composed immature and poorly sorted conglomerates and sandstones.

It is named after the character of these sediments in parts of the coast where they form coastal cliffs, "barreiras" in Portuguese.

== Stratigraphy ==
Age	Formation	Stage
Tertiary	Barreiras	Drift
Tertiary	Mosqueiro	Drift
Tertiary	Marituba	Drift
Santonian	Calumbi	Drift
Coniacian	Cotinguiba	Drift
Turonian	Cotinguiba	Drift
Early Cenomanian	Cotinguiba	Drift
Early Cenomanian	Riachuelo	Drift
Albian	Riachuelo	Drift
Late Aptian	Riachuelo	Drift
Late Aptian	Maceío	Transitional
Late Aptian	Muribeca	Transitional
Late Aptian	Poção	Rift
Early Aptian	Ponta Verde	Rift
Barremian	Morro das Chaves	Rift
Hauterivian	Rio Pitanga	Rift
Early Cretaceous	Coqueiro Seco	Rift
Early Cretaceous	Penedo	Rift
Early Cretaceous	Barra de Itiúba	Rift
Early Cretaceous	Serraria	Pre-rift
Late Jurassic	Serraria	Pre-rift
Late Jurassic	Bananeiras	Pre-rift
Late Jurassic	Candeeiro	Pre-rift
Middle Jurassic	Hiatus	
Early Jurassic	Hiatus	
Triassic	Hiatus	
Early Permian	Aracaré	Syneclise
Early Permian	Batinga	Syneclise
Late Carboniferous	Batinga	Syneclise
Devonian	Hiatus	
Silurian	Hiatus	
Ordovician	Hiatus	
Cambrian	Estância	
Proterozoic	Basement	
