= Huilma =

- Interactive map of Huilma
- Coordinates: 40°42′34.24″S 73°16′19.26″W
- Region: Los Lagos
- Province: Osorno
- Municipalidad: Río Negro
- Comuna: Río Negro

Government
  - Type: Municipalidad
  - Alcalde: Carlos Schwalm Urzúa
- Elevation: 62 m (203 ft)

Population (2017 census )
  - Total: 58
- Time zone: UTC−04:00 (Chilean Standard)
  - Summer (DST): UTC−03:00 (Chilean Daylight)
- Area code: Country + town = 56 + 64

Huilma is a hamlet (Spanish: caserío) northwest of the town of Río Negro and southwest of the city of Osorno in south-central Chile. It lies along to Chile Route U-72. The hamlet had 58 inhabitants as of 2017.
