= Thiollierepycnodus =

Thiollierepycnodus Temporal range: Kimmeridgian–Tithonian
- Life reconstruction of Thiollierepycnodus wagneri

Scientific classification
- Kingdom: Animalia
- Phylum: Chordata
- Class: Actinopterygii
- Order: †Pycnodontiformes
- Family: †Pycnodontidae
- Subfamily: †Proscinetinae
- Genus: †Thiollierepycnodus; Ebert, 2020

Species
- †T. wagneri

Extinct genus of pycnodontid fish

Thiollierepycnodus is an extinct genus of pycnodontid fish from the Jurassic of France and Germany. The animal was originally assigned to the genus Pycnodus, but it was given its own genus in 2020. Thiollierepycnodus was 25 cm long, with a laterally flat body and comparatively large fins, indicating that it was a reef fish of considerable manoeuvrability. Its durophagous dentition strongly suggests a diet of hard-shelled organisms. It contains a single species, Thiollierepycnodus wagneri.

== Discovery and naming ==
The original specimens of Thiollierepycnodus were discorvered in Cerin, France, and, in 2014, new fossils of the genus were uncovered in Wattendorf, Germany. The fossil was originally described as Pycnodus wagneri by Victor Joseph de l’Isle Thiollière in 1852. The name of the species, P. wagneri, was in reference to Dr Johannes Andreas Wagner, a professor of zoology who lectured at the university in Munich.

In 1856, Heckel transferred the species to Microdon, a genus that turned out to be invalid, and was replaced by Proscinetes. In 1949, Saint-Seine referred to the species as Gyrodus, but though it didn't belong to that genus. In, 2002, Poyato-Ariza and Wenz referred to it as Proscinetes? wagneri. Martin Ebert, in 2020, erected the genus Thiollierepycnodus to replace P. wagneri.

The name Thiollierepycnodus is in reference to Thiollère, with the suffix "pycnodus" in reference to the genus it was originally assigned.

== Description ==
Thiollierepycnodus had a total length of 25 cm, with a laterally compressed body and, without the fins, a contour resembling an almost perfect disc. Its dorsal and anal fins were large and had elongated fin rays.

Thiollierepycnodus, alongside Proscinetes, are the oldest pycnodontids discovered with complete skeletons. Older specimens are known only from isolated remains, mainly dentition.

== Phylogeny ==
Thiollierepycnodus belonged in the subfamily Proscinetinae of the Pycnodontidae family, being a sister taxon to the Proscinetini tribe.

- Proscinetinae
  - - - Proscinetes? radiatus
      - - - Proscinetini
            - - Proscinetes bernardi
              - Proscinete elegans
            - Neoproscinetes penalvei
          - Thiollierepycnodus wagneri
        - Turboscinetes egertoni
    - Turbomesodon regelans
  - - Turbomesodon bernissartensis
    - Turbomesodon praeclarus
