= Feliz Deserto Formation =

Geologic formation in Brazil

- Stratigraphic range: Berriasian-Valanginian; ~145–132 Ma
- Type: Geological formation

Location
- Region: Sergipe-Alagoas Basin of Northeastern Brazil
- Country: Brazil

Type section
- Named for: Feliz Deserto

The Feliz Deserto Formation is a geologic formation of the Early Cretaceous age (Berriasian to Valanginian) in northeastern Brazil's Sergipe-Alagoas Basin. The formation belongs to the rift phase, in which a great lake formed.

== Background ==
The formation provides vertebrate fossils of Lepidotes fish and teeth of crocodylomorphs and theropods, including what may be the oldest members of the Spinosauridae reported in South America.

== Fossil content ==
Color key: Taxon / Reclassified taxon / Taxon falsely reported as present / Dubious taxon or junior synonym / Ichnotaxon / Ootaxon / Morphotaxon	Notes; Uncertain or tentative taxa are in small text; ~~crossed out~~ taxa are discredited.

=== Dinosaurs ===
==== Theropods ====
Theropods of the Feliz Deserto Formation
Genus	Species	Location	Stratigraphic position	Material	Notes	Images
Baryonychinae indet.	Indeterminate			A tooth	A spinosaurid theropod	
Spinosaurinae indet.	Indeterminate			Eight teeth	A spinosaurid theropod	
Theropoda indet.	Indeterminate			A toe bone		

=== Crocodylomorphs ===
Crocodylomorphs of the Feliz Deserto Formation
Genus	Species	Location	Stratigraphic position	Material	Notes	Images
Crocodyliformes indet.	Indeterminate			Six isolated teeth		
Mesoeucrocodylia indet.	Indeterminate			An isolated osteoderm		
Neosuchia Indet.	Indeterminate			Eleven isolated teeth		

=== Fish ===
Fishes of the Feliz Deserto Formation
Genus	Species	Location	Stratigraphic position	Material	Notes	Images
Lepidotes	L. sp.				A lepidotid fish	
