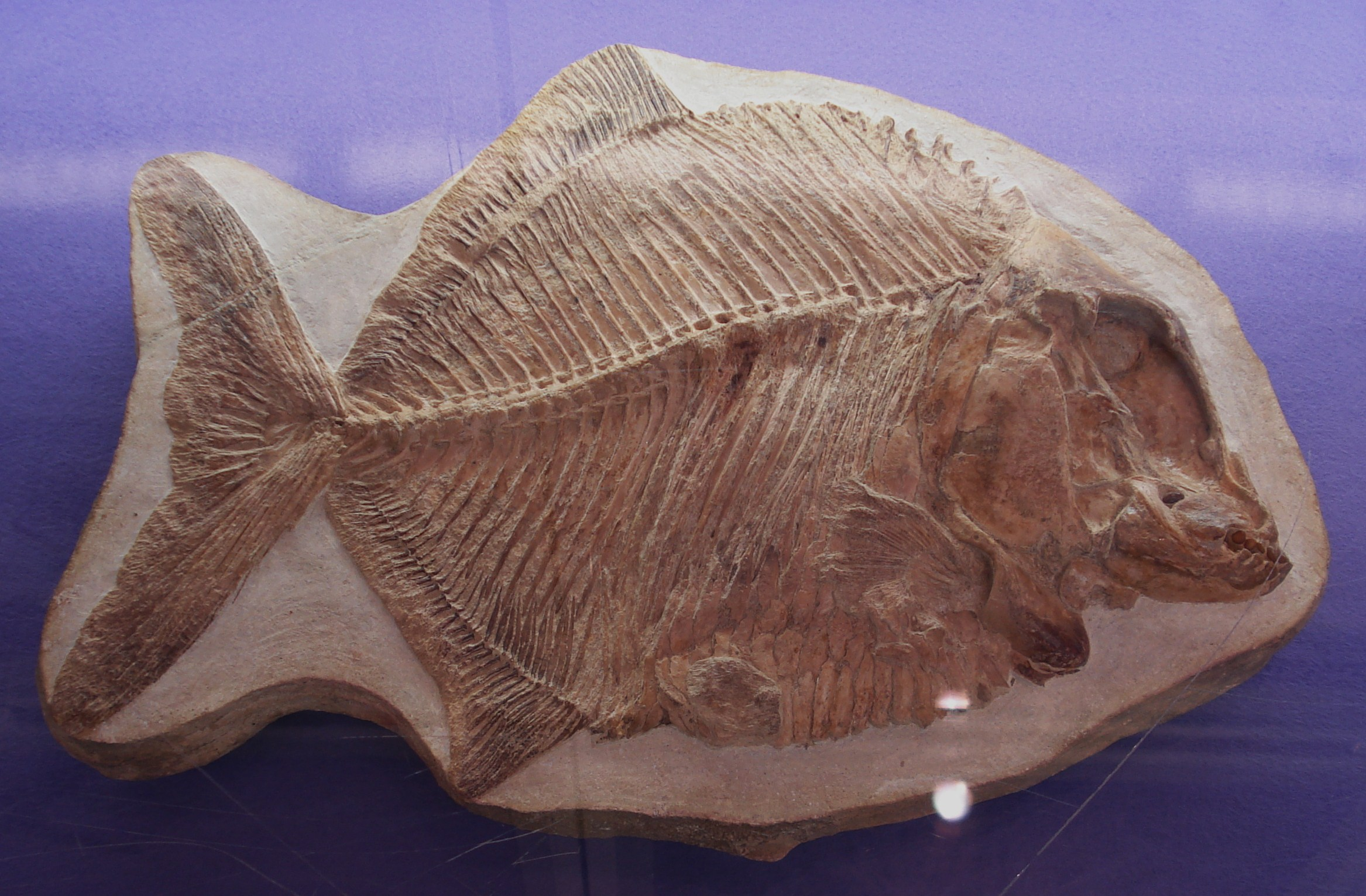
- Fossil of Neoproscinetes penalvai at the Palaeontological Museum, Munich.

Scientific classification
- Domain: Eukaryota
- Kingdom: Animalia
- Phylum: Chordata
- Class: Actinopterygii
- Order: †Pycnodontiformes
- Family: †Pycnodontidae
- Subfamily: †Proscinetinae
- Genus: †Neoproscinetes; Santos 1990

Species
- P. penalvai Santos 1990

= Neoproscinetes =

Neoproscinetes Temporal range: Aptian ~122–112 Ma

Extinct genus of fishes

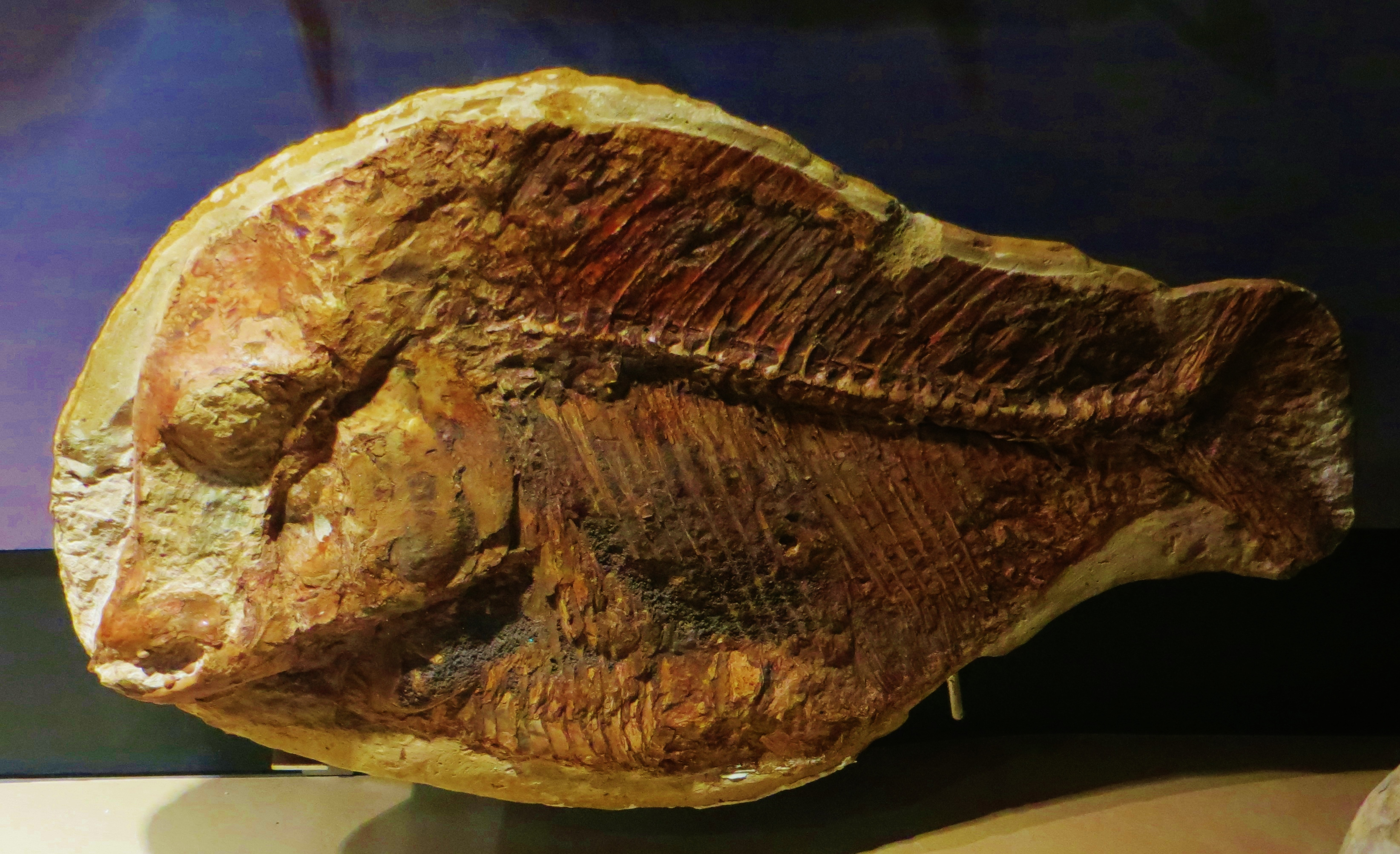
Fossil in the Museo di Geologia di Castell'arquato

Neoproscinetes is a genus of extinct pycnodontid fish from the Cretaceous Santana Formation of Brazil. Fossils of this species have also been discovered in the Riachuelo Formation.

== Phylogeny ==
Within Pycnodontidae, Neoproscinetes sits in the Proscinetinae subfamily, alongside Proscinetes, Thiollierepycnodus, Turboscinetes and Turbomesodon. Both Neoproscinetes and Proscinetes are highly derived genera of pycnodonts.

- Proscinetinae
  - - - Proscinetes? radiatus
      - - - Proscinetini
            - - Proscinetes bernardi
              - Proscinete elegans
            - Neoproscinetes penalvei
          - Thiollierepycnodus wagneri
        - Turboscinetes egertoni
    - Turbomesodon regelans
  - - Turbomesodon bernissartensis
    - Turbomesodon praeclarus
