= Riachuelo, Sergipe =

Municipality in Sergipe, Brazil

Riachuelo Município de Riachuelo
- Municipality
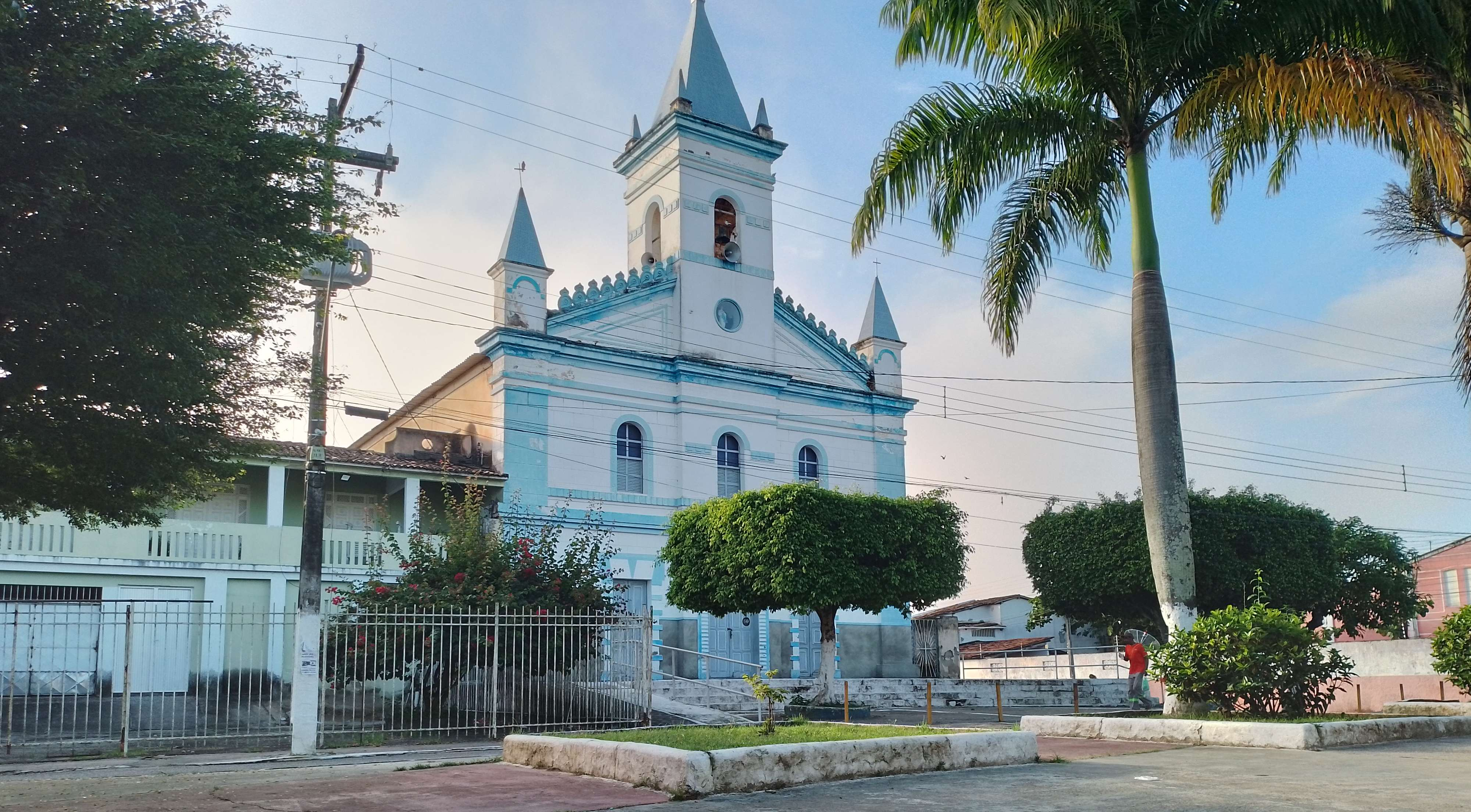
- Igreja Matriz Nossa Senhora da Conceição in 2023

- Flag Coat of arms

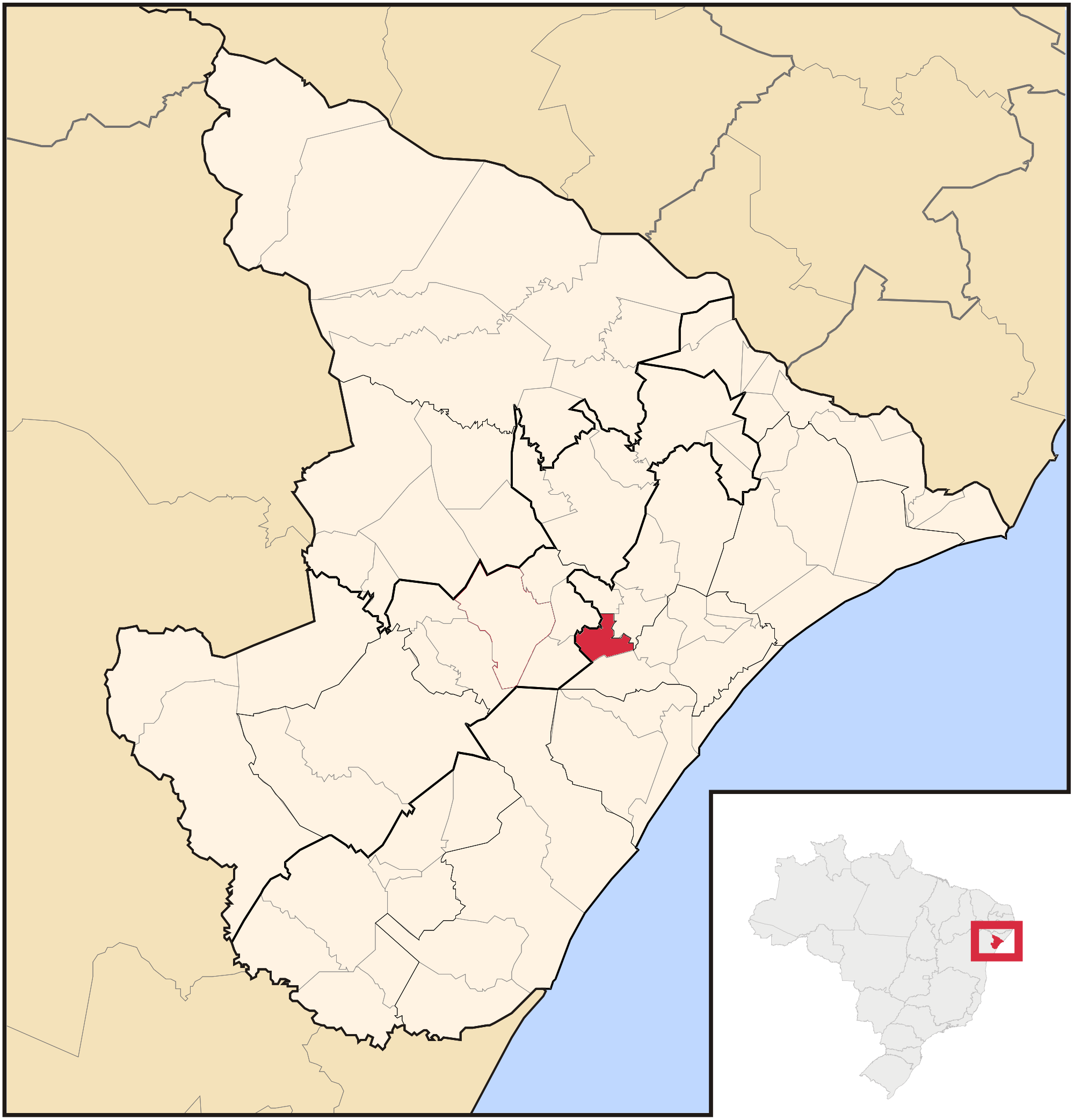
- Location of Riachuelo in Sergipe

- Location of Riachuelo in Brazil
- Coordinates: 10°43′40″S 37°11′13″W
- Country: Brazil
- Region: Northeast
- State: Sergipe
- Founded: 1874

Government
  - Mayor: Peterson Dantas Araujo

Area
  - Total: 78.31 km^{2} (30.24 sq mi)
- Elevation: 37 m (121 ft)

Population (2020)
  - Total: 10,284
  - Density: 131.3/km^{2} (340.1/sq mi)
- Demonym: Riachuelense
- Time zone: UTC−3 (BRT)
- Website: riachuelo.se.gov.br

Riachuelo (Brazilian Portuguese pronunciation: [ʁjɐʃʊeˈlʊ]) English: Stream link) is a municipality located in the Brazilian state of Sergipe. Its population was 10,284 (2020) and covers 78.31 km^{2} (30.24 mi^{2}). Riachuelo has a population density of 130 inhabitants per square kilometer. Riachuelo is located 23 km (14 mi) from the state capital of Sergipe, Aracaju. Riachuelo borders the municipalities of Laranjeiras, Divina Pastora, Santa Rosa de Lima, and Areia Branca, all within the state of Sergipe. The municipality is site of the Nossa Senhora da Penha Sugar Plantation and the Chapel of the Nossa Senhora da Penha Sugar Plantation. The chapel was listed as a historic structure by National Institute of Historic and Artistic Heritage (IPHAN) in 1943, but has fallen into an advanced state of neglect and decay and is considered abandoned.

The municipality also sits on top of the Riachuelo Formation, a geological formation named after the city.

== History ==
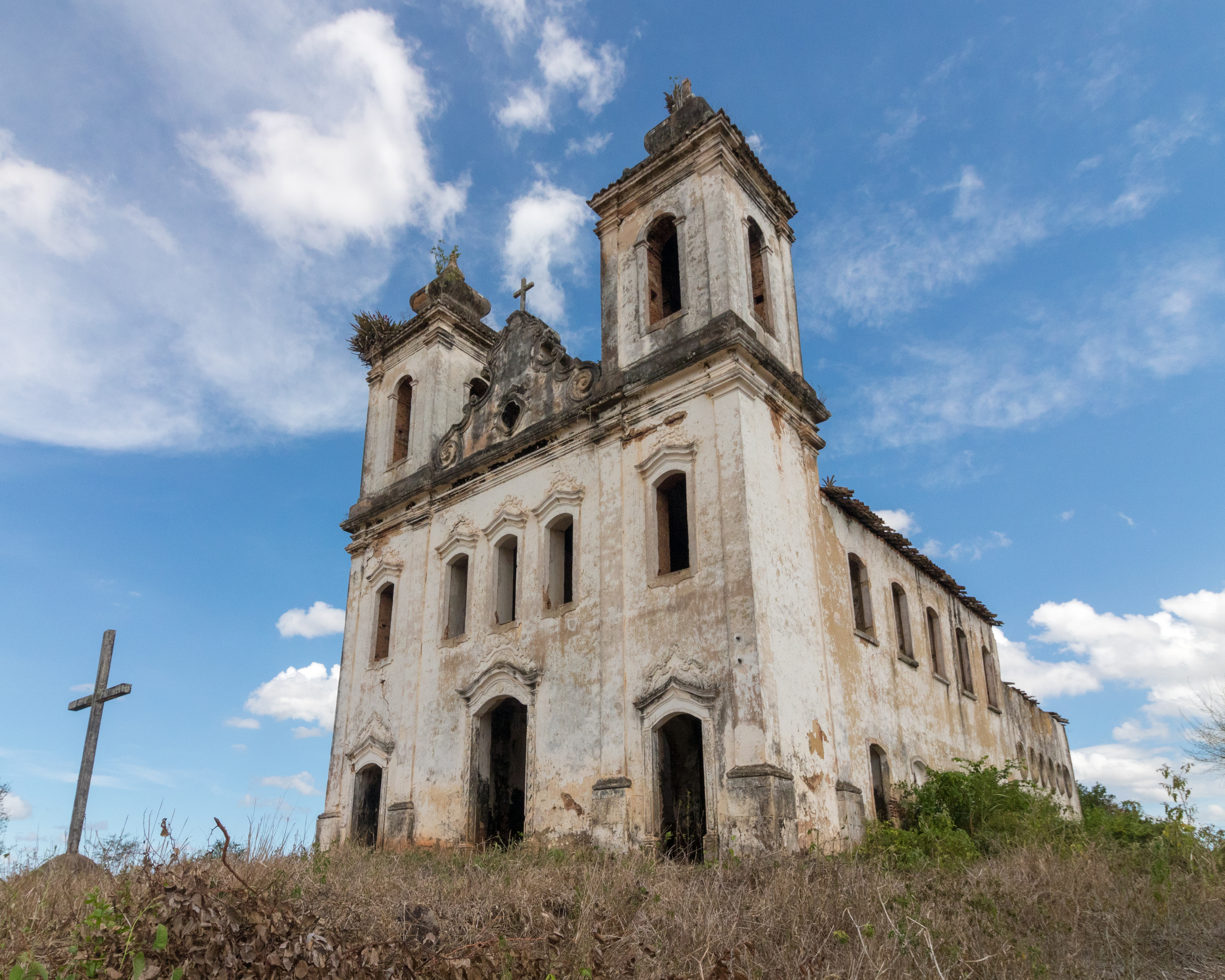
Façade of the Chapel of the Nossa Senhora da Penha Sugar Plantation

By the 1590s, the region that today encompasses municipality of Riachuelo was occupied by the family of the Portuguese Mesquita Pinto, where it was constructed his sugar cane mill, also known in Brazil as engenho. Thus, because of the family surname, the settlement was called "Os Pintos" (in English "The Pintos").

On the period of 1602 and 1603, occurred the colonization of the valleys of the Cotinguiba and Sergipe Rivers jointly to the industrialization of the sugar cane. The "Os Pintos" settlement experienced considerable growth due to the good qualities of its lands. Many of the engenhos were turned into farms, with some of them being subject to land reform and others, deactivated, still being able to be identified by their ruins.

On 6 May 1872, the settlement was elevated to the status of freguesia (parish), and was known from then forth as Freguesia de Nossa Senhora da Conceição de Riachuelo. In 1872, the parish was elevated to the status of town, maintaining the name and old territorial limits, being a dismemberment of the municipality of Laranjeiras. The elevation from town to city took place on the republican period, in 1890, when it was renamed to Riachuelo. During the 1960s, Riachuelo suffered great territorial lost, because of the emancipation of the municipality of Areia Branca, even becoming one of the smallest municipalities of the state of Sergipe, with only 78.9 km^{2}.

About the origin of the name Riachuelo, there are two versions. The first is that the settlement was located between three rivers, the Sergipe, Cotinguiba and Jacarecica Rivers, thus making a link (from Portuguese, riacho meaning "stream" and elo meaning "link"). The second, more accepted version, tells that it is an homage to a decisive battle during the Paraguay War, the Battle of Riachuelo, won by the Admiral Francisco Barroso on 11 July 1865.

About the origin of the city, there is a consensus among the oldest inhabitants that it sprouted from the Sítio do Meio settlement, and from there grew into the urban space it is today.

== Heritage sites ==
By 1875, Riachuelo had 35 sugar plantations (engenhos), after that date a few more were created, like the Engenho Central Riachuelo in 1888. In the modern day, most of them have either been deactivated or have transitioned into other businesses models, like fish farming and animal husbandry.

A few of them were listed by the National Institute of Historic and Artistic Heritage, as in the case of the Lyra Sugar Plantation Archeological Site and the Chapel of the Nossa Senhora da Penha Sugar Plantation. The chapel is one of the most important buildings in the religious architecture of Sergipe, built between the end of the 18th century and beginning of the 19th century. But even being listed as historical heritage ever since 1943, it has fallen into a state of abandonment and decay, with much of the east façade having collapsed.

A geological formation is also named after the town, the Riachuelo Formation. The fauna dates the formation as ranging from the Aptian to the Albian stages of the Early Cretaceous. It is rich in marine micro and macro fauna, with a particular abundance of ammonites, but also with fossils of gastropods, bivalves, brachiopods, serpulids, equinoderms, ostracoids, radiolarians, lobsters and Crabs. Several fish species reported from the Santana formation also occur in this formation, namely: Cladocyclus gardneri, Neoproscinetes penalvai, Notelops brama, Rhacolepis buccalis, Tharrhias araripis and Vinctifer comptoni.

== Economy ==
The sugar based economy of the state of Sergipe started during the early 17th century. As of 1612, there was but 1 sugar plantation in the state, by 1798, the number was of 140 plantations, and by 1863 it hit 750 plantations, the highest number in its history. By 1875, the then town of Riachuelo had 35 engenhos.

This initially construction sugar plantations, and then later the construction of the Engenho Central Riachuelo, an industrial plant with modern machinery, led the city to become one of the most powerful sugar cane producers of Sergipe and of Latin America during the early 20th century. The machinery of the Engenho Central was of Dutch origin, which set them apart from the other states which used machines of English origin.

In the modern day, many of these plantations have been deactivated or transitioned into other businesses models, such as fish farming and animal husbandry.

There was also a textile factory in the Engenho Central offering work for the women of the employees. When that factory closed during the 1970s, a new one was opened by the Sergipe Industrial S/A company.

== Notable people ==
- Augusto César Leite (Riachuelo, 30 July 1886 – Aracaju, 9 February 1978) was a medical doctor, politician and intellectual. Regarded as the father of Sergipe's medicine, he founded the Cirurgia Hospital in Aracaju. He was also the first president of the Sergipe Medical Society, between 1937 and 1948, among other achievements.
- José Santo Souza (Riachuelo, 27 January 1919 – Aracaju, 18 April 2014) was a poet. He was self-taught and published his first poetry book, "Cidade Subterrânea" (Subterranean City), in 1953. He was also a member of the Academia Sergipana de Letras (Sergipe Academy of Letters).
- João Pires Wynne (Riachuelo, 5 April 1905 – Aracaju, 1974) was a poet, lawyer, politician and journalist. A founding member of the Sergipe Academy of Letters, some of his works include "Castro Alves – síntese da vida e obra do poeta", "Vulto que Fica", as well as his sonnets and the two volume "História de Sergipe", recounting the history of the state from 1575 to 1972, the year of the books publication.
