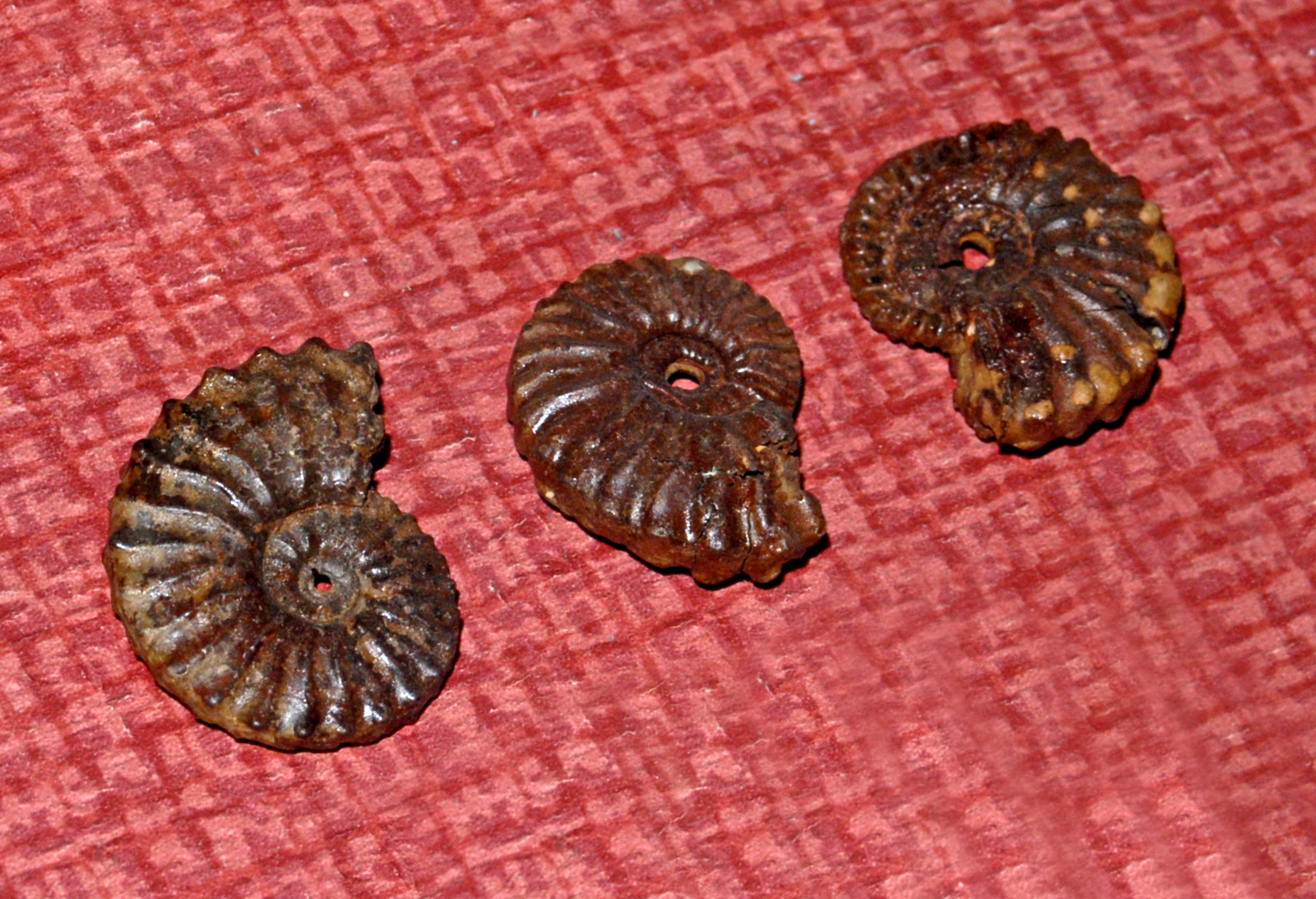
- Dufrenoya dufrenoyi from France

Scientific classification
- Kingdom: Animalia
- Phylum: Mollusca
- Class: Cephalopoda
- Subclass: †Ammonoidea
- Order: †Ammonitida
- Suborder: †Ancyloceratina
- Superfamily: †Deshayesitoidea
- Family: †Parahoplitidae; Spath, 1922

Subfamilies
- See text

= Parahoplitidae =

Parahoplitidae Temporal range: Lower Cretaceous

Extinct family of ammonites

Parahoplitidae is an extinct family of Cretaceous ammonites with stoutly ribbed, compressed, generally involute shells lacking or with only minor tubercles included in the Deshayestoidea, a superfamily now separated from the Hoplitacaceae.

== Subfamilies and genera ==
The family contains two subfamilies and eight genera.

- Deshayesitinae Stoyanow, 1949
  - Deshayesites Kazansky, 1914
  - Dufrenoyia Kilian and Reboul, 1915
  - Diadochoceras Hyatt, 1900
  - Hypacanthoplites Spath, 1923
- Parahoplitinae Spath, 1922
  - Kazanskyella Stoyanow, 1949
  - Parahoplites Anthula, 1899
  - Sinzowiella Stoyanow, 1949
  - Parahoplitoides Spath, 1922
