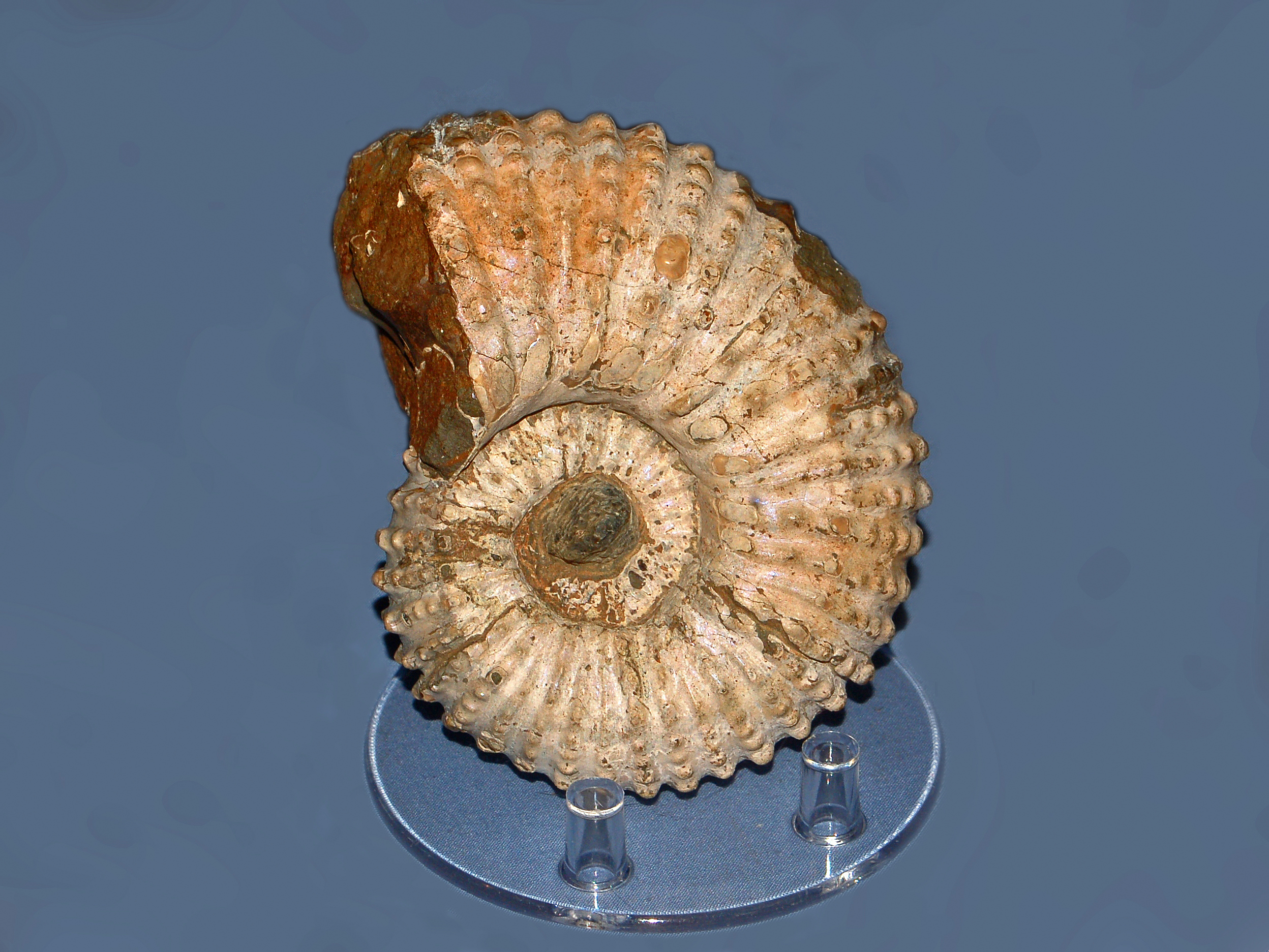
- Douvilleiceras sp. – Albian of Madagascar

Scientific classification
- Kingdom: Animalia
- Phylum: Mollusca
- Class: Cephalopoda
- Subclass: †Ammonoidea
- Order: †Ammonitida
- Suborder: †Ancyloceratina
- Family: †Douvilleiceratidae
- Genus: †Douvilleiceras; Grossouvre, 1894

Species
- See text

= Douvilleiceras =

Douvilleiceras Temporal range: Barremian-Cenomanian (typically Albian) ~125–89 Ma

Genus of ammonite cephalopod

Douvilleiceras is a genus of ammonites from the Middle to Late Cretaceous. Its fossils have been found worldwide, in Africa, Asia, Europe, and North and South America.

== Description ==
Shells of Douvilleiceras inaequinodum can reach a diameter of about 8–10 cm (3.1–3.9 in).

== Species ==
Species within the genus Douvilleiceras include:

- D. clementium
- D. inaequinodum (Quenstedt, 1849)
- D. mamillare
- D. mammillatum (Schlotheim, 1813)
- D. meyendorffi
- D. monile (Sowerby, 1836)
- D. muralense Stoyanow 1949
- D. offarcinatum
- D. orbignyi Hyatt, 1903
- D. scabrosum
- D. solitae
- D. spiniferum (Whiteaves, 1876)

== Distribution ==
Fossils of Douvilleiceras are found in the Cretaceous of Angola, Brazil, Canada, Colombia (Capotes Formation, Cundinamarca), the Dominican Republic, Egypt, France, Iran, Japan, Madagascar, Mexico, Peru, South Africa, Switzerland, the former USSR, the United Kingdom, Alaska and Texas. D. inaequinodum fossils have been found in Albian strata of France.

== Gallery ==
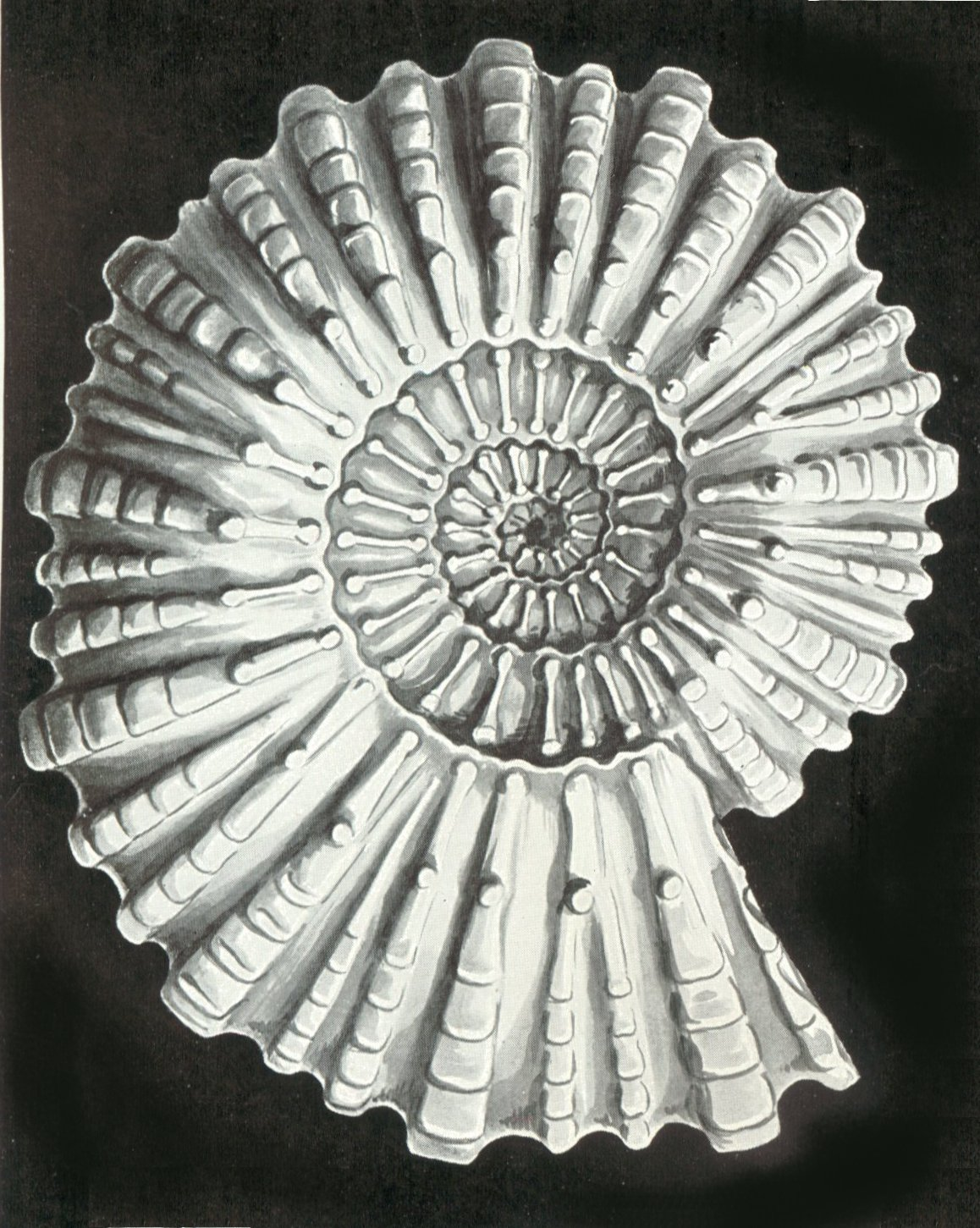
D. mammillatum

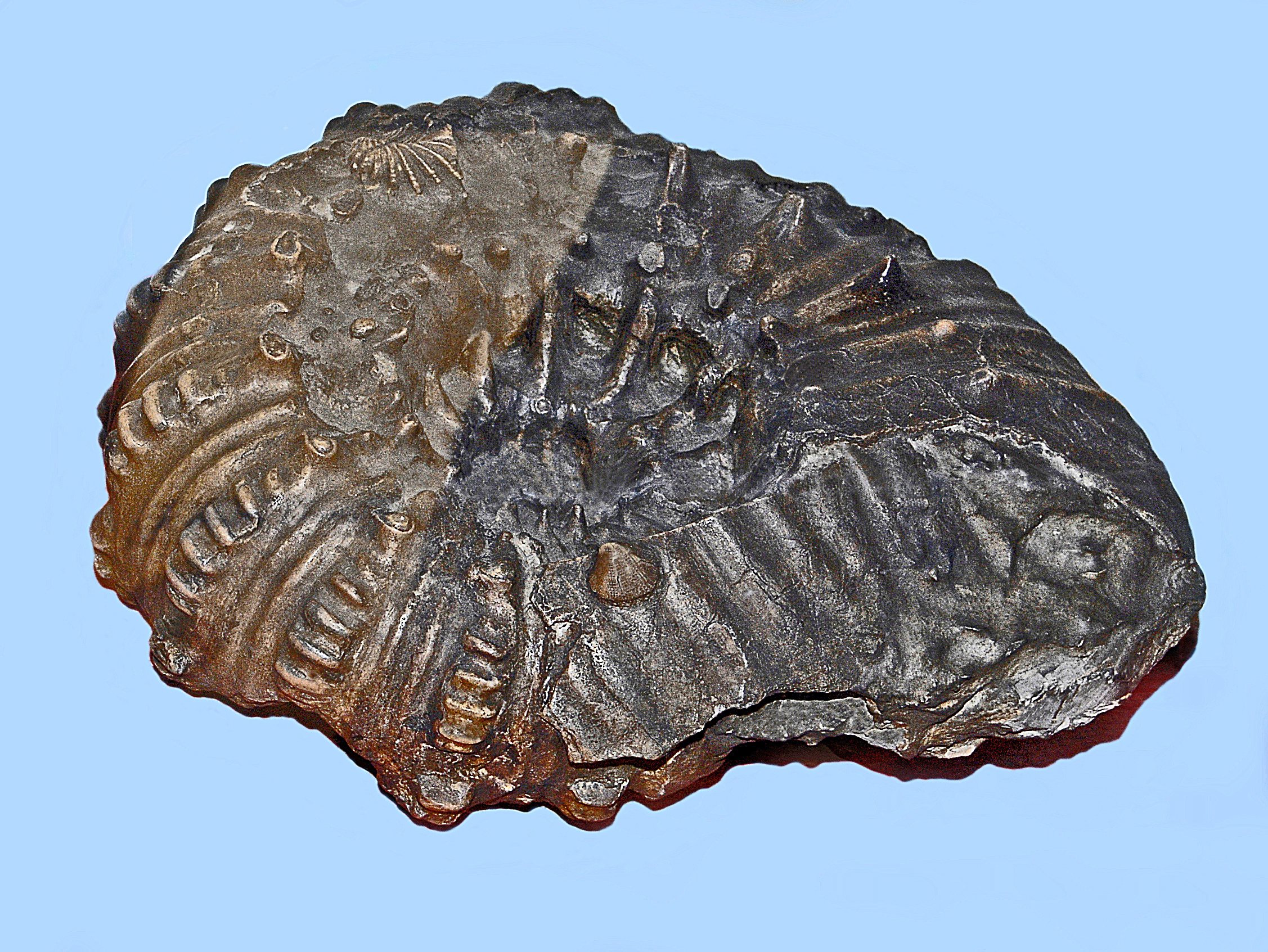
D. inaequinodum

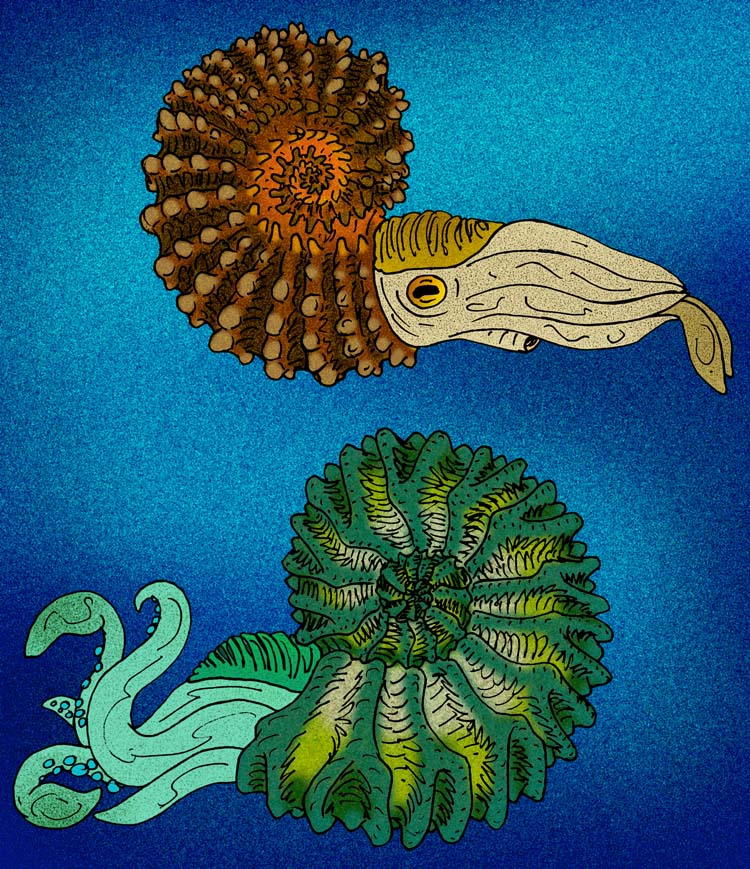
Reconstruction of D. mammillatum with Hoplites dentatus
