= Riachuelo, Chile =

Riachuelo
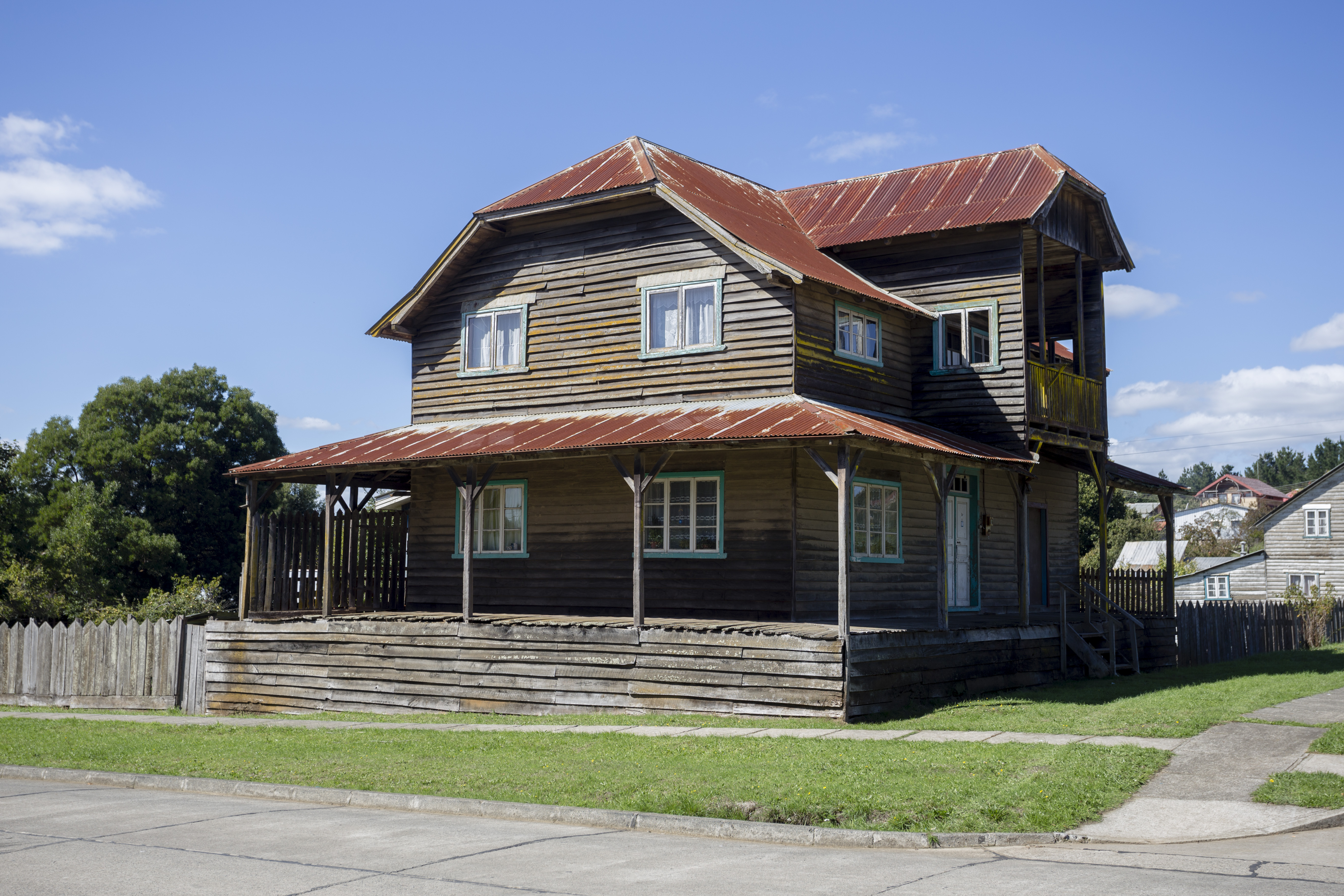
- Old house in Riachuelo
- Interactive map of Riachuelo
- Coordinates: 40.819502°S 73.338651°W
- Region: Los Lagos
- Province: Osorno
- Municipalidad: Río Negro
- Comuna: Río Negro

Government
  - Type: Municipalidad
  - Alcalde: Carlos Schwalm Urzúa
- Elevation: 90 m (300 ft)

Population (2017 census )
  - Total: 801
- Time zone: UTC−04:00 (Chilean Standard)
  - Summer (DST): UTC−03:00 (Chilean Daylight)
- Area code: Country + town = 56 + 64

Riachuelo is a village west of the town of Río Negro in south-central Chile. It lies along to Chile Route U-72. It had 801 inhabitants as of 2017.
