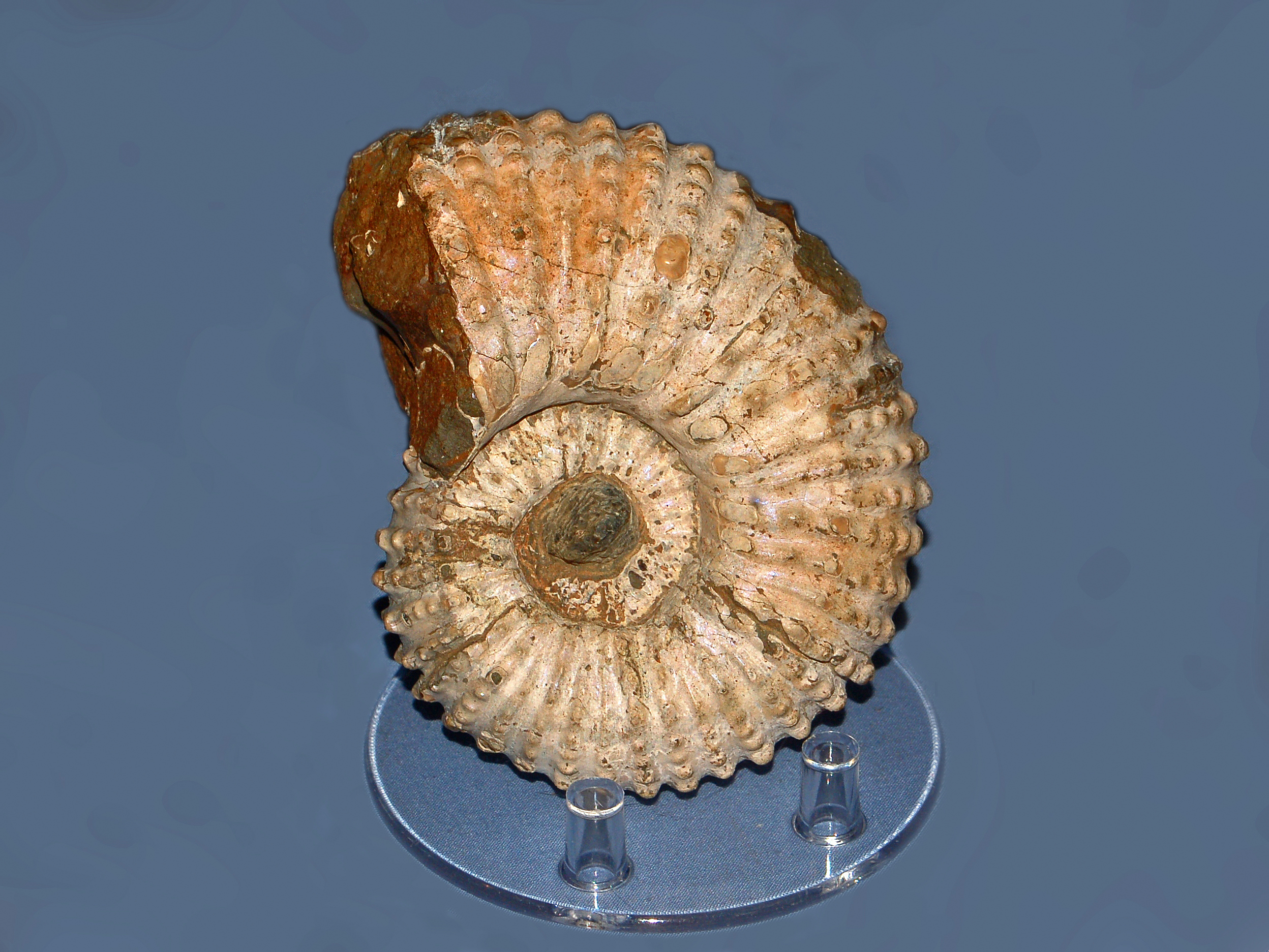
- Douvilleiceras species

Scientific classification
- Kingdom: Animalia
- Phylum: Mollusca
- Class: Cephalopoda
- Subclass: †Ammonoidea
- Order: †Ammonitida
- Suborder: †Ancyloceratina
- Superfamily: †Douvilleiceratoidea
- Family: †Douvilleiceratidae; Parona and Bonarelli, 1897

= Douvilleiceratidae =

Douvilleiceratidae Temporal range: Cretaceous

Extinct family of ammonites

Douvilleiceratidae is a family of ammonites. These fast-moving nektonic carnivores lived in the Cretaceous from 125.45 to 94.3 Ma.

Its fossils have been found in Angola, Brazil, Canada, Colombia, the Dominican Republic, France, Germany, India, Iran, Italy, Japan, Madagascar, Mexico, Morocco, Peru, South Africa, Spain, Switzerland, Russia, the United Kingdom, United States and Venezuela.

== Subfamilies and genera ==
- Cheloniceratinae Spath, 1923
  - Cheloniceras Hyatt, 1903
  - Procheloniceras Spath, 1923
- Douvilleiceratinae Parona and Bonarelli, 1987
  - Douvilleiceras Grossouvre, 1894
- Roloboceratinae Casey, 1961
  - Roloboceras
