= Itaporanga d'Ajuda =

Municipality in Sergipe, Brazil

- Municipality
- Municipio de Itaporanga d'Ajuda
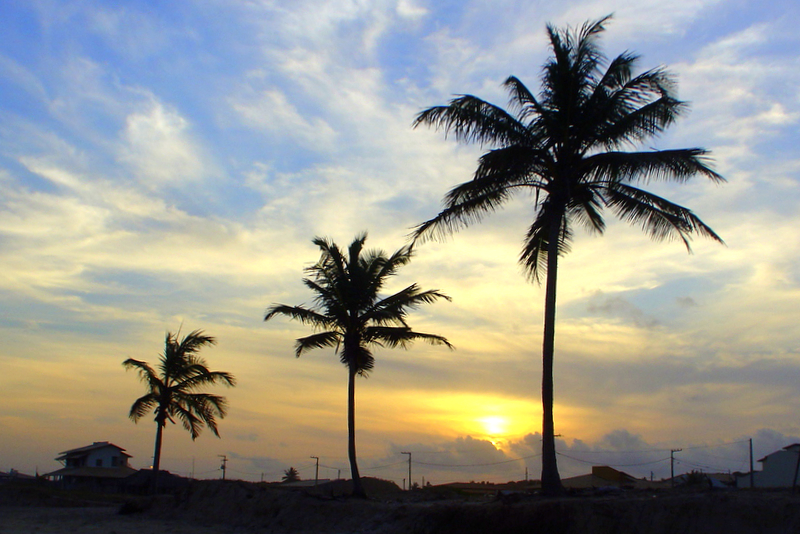
- Praia da Caueira, Itaporanga d'Ajuda

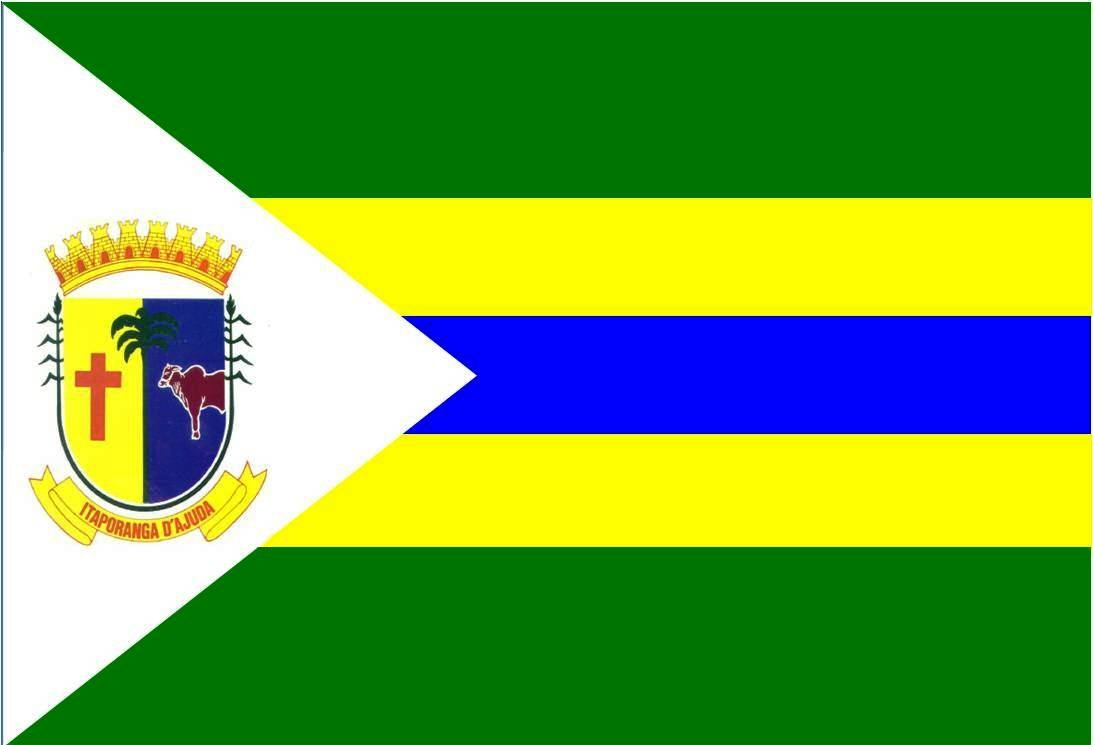
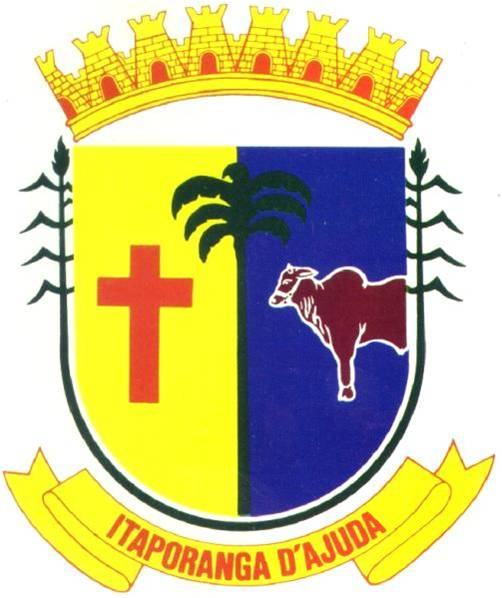
- Flag Coat of arms

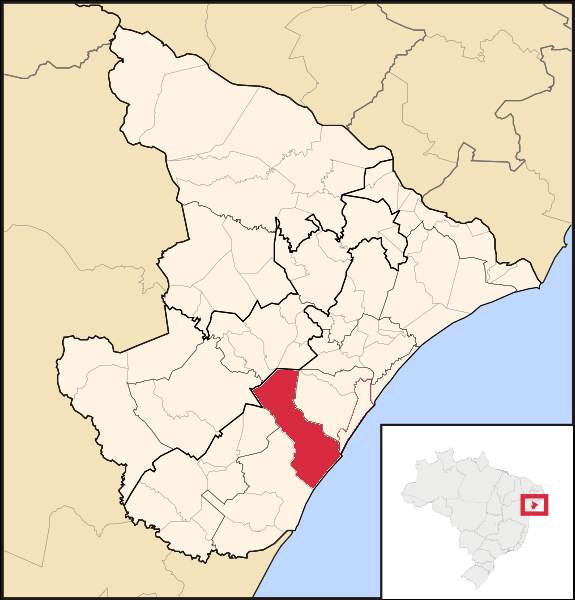
- Location of Itaporanga d'Ajuda in the State of Sergipe

- Location in Brazil
- Country: Brazil
- Region: Northeast Region
- State: Sergipe

Area
  - Total: 757 km^{2} (292 sq mi)

Population
  - Total: 34,709
  - Density: 45.9/km^{2} (119/sq mi)
- Time zone: UTC−3 (BRT)

Itaporanga d'Ajuda (Brazilian Portuguese: [itapoˈɾɐ̃ɡɐ daˈʒudɐ]) is a Brazilian municipality in the Northeastern state of Sergipe. It covers 757 square kilometres (292 mi^{2}), has a population of 34,709 (2020) and a population density of 46 residents per km^{2} (120/sq mi). It is home to the Tejupeba House and the Chapel of the Colégio Sugar Plantation, a plantation house and chapel cited as the first Jesuits settlement in Portuguese Brazil.

The municipality contains part of the Serra de Itabaiana National Park.

== Toponym ==
"Itaporanga" is a Tupi language term meaning "beautiful stone". It is formed by the word itá, meaning stone, and poranga, meaning beautiful. "D'Ajuda" is a reference to the patron of the municipality, Our Lady of Help (Nossa Senhora da Ajuda).

== See also ==
- List of municipalities in Sergipe
