= List of the Mesozoic life of Arizona =

This list of the Mesozoic life of Arizona contains the various prehistoric life-forms whose fossilized remains have been reported from within the US state of Arizona and are between 252.17 and 66 million years of age.

== A ==
- †Acaenasuchus – type locality for genus
  - †Acaenasuchus geoffreyi – type locality for species
- †Acallosuchus – type locality for genus
  - †Acallosuchus rectori – type locality for species
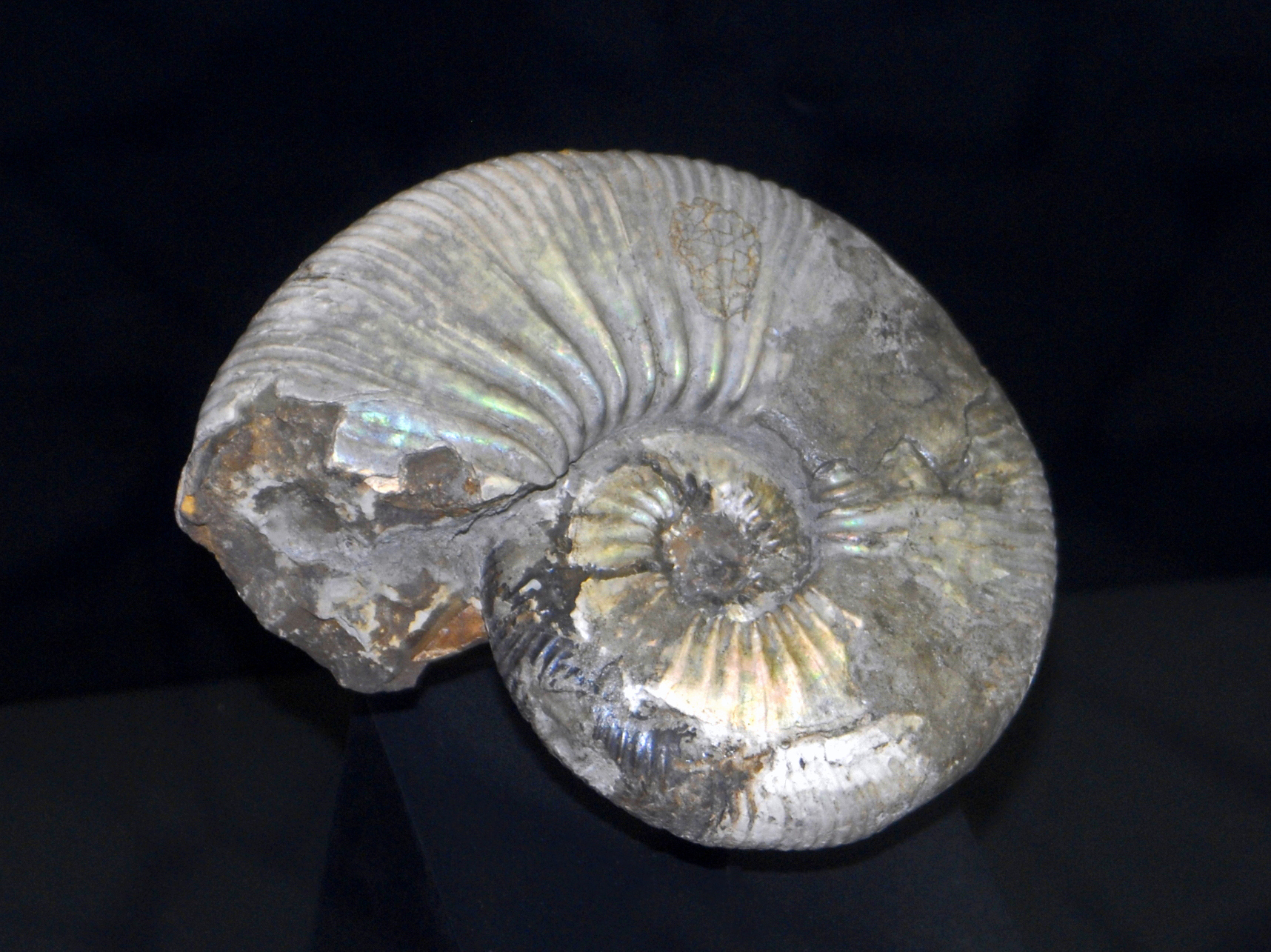
- Fossilized shell of the Early Cretaceous ammonoid cephalopod Acanthohoplites
  †Acanthohoplites
  - †Acanthohoplites berkeyi
  - †Acanthohoplites erraticus
  - †Acanthohoplites hesper
  - †Acanthohoplites impetrabilis
  - †Acanthohoplites schucherti
  - †Acanthohoplites teres
- Acila
  - †Acila schencki
- Acirsa
  - †Acirsa kelseyi – type locality for species
- Acmaea
- †Acrodus
- †Acteon
  - †Acteon propinguis
- †Actinastrea
- †Adamanasuchus – type locality for genus
  - †Adamanasuchus eisenhardtae – type locality for species
- †Admetopsis
  - †Admetopsis subfusiformis
- †Adocus
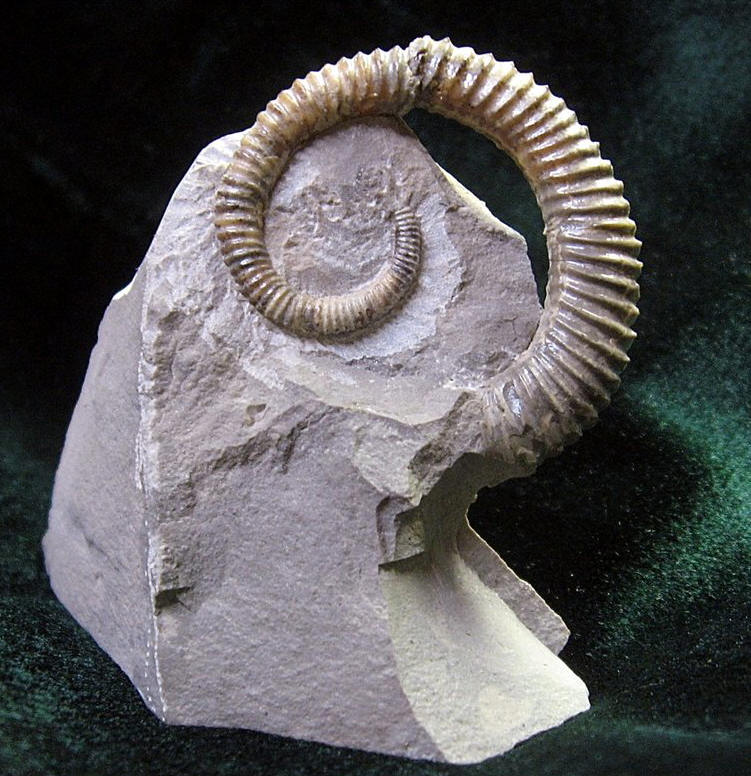
- Fossilized shell of the Late Cretaceous ammonoid cephalopod Allocrioceras
  †Allocrioceras
  - †Allocrioceras annulatum
- †Alzadites
  - †Alzadites incomptus
- †Ambrosea
  - †Ambrosea nitida
- †Ammorhynchus – type locality for genus
  - †Ammorhynchus navajoi – type locality for species
- †Anaschisma – report made of unidentified related form or using admittedly obsolete nomenclature
- †Anatimya
  - †Anatimya virgata
- †Anchura
  - †Anchura hopii – type locality for species
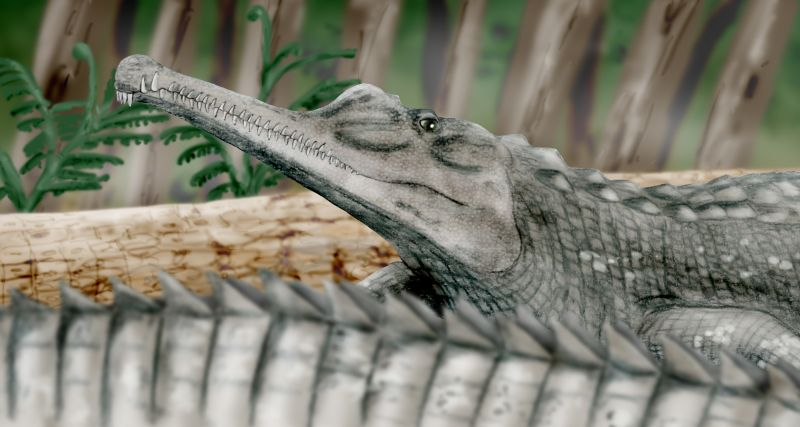
- Restoration of the Late Triassic phytosaur Angistorhinus
  †Angistorhinus – tentative report
- †Anisoceras
  - †Anisoceras coloradoense
- †Anisodontosaurus – type locality for genus
  - †Anisodontosaurus greeri – type locality for species
- †Anisomyon
  - †Anisomyon spp.
- †Anomia
  - †Anomia ponticulana
- †Antediplodon
  - †Antediplodon dockumensis
- †Apachesaurus
  - †Apachesaurus gregorii
- †Apatosaurus
- †Aphrodina
  - †Aphrodina munda – or unidentified comparable form
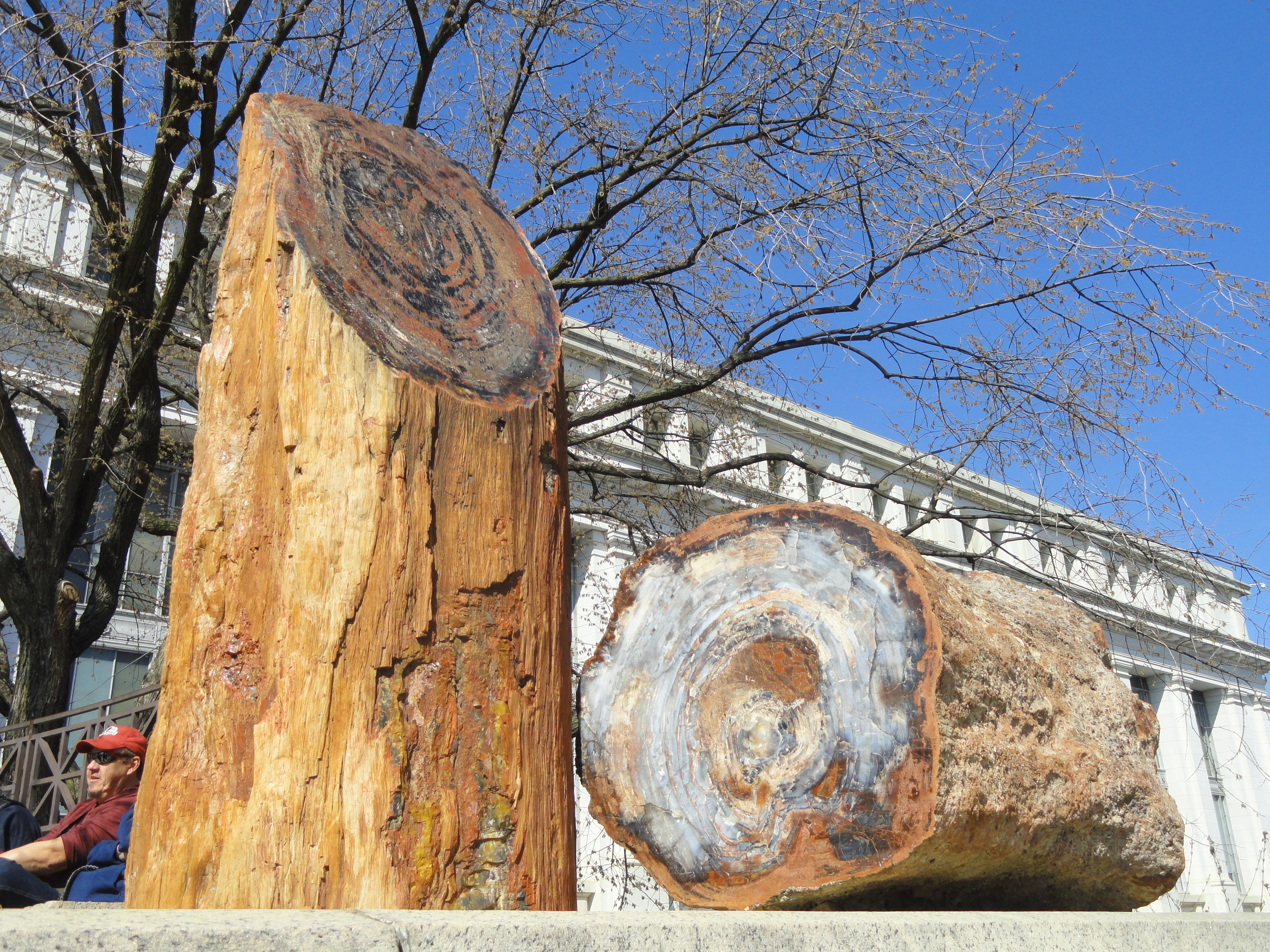
- Petrified trunk segments of the Permian-Late Triassic conifer tree Araucarioxylon arizonicum. This species is the state fossil of Arizona
  †Araucarioxylon
  - †Araucarioxylon arizonicum
- †Arca
- Arcopagia – or unidentified comparable form
  - †Arcopagia A – informal
- Arctica
- †Arganodus
- †Aricycas
  - †Aricycas paulae
- †Arizonasaurus – type locality for genus
  - †Arizonasaurus babbitti – type locality for species
- Astarte
  - †Astarte adkinsi
- †Australosomus – or unidentified comparable form

== B ==
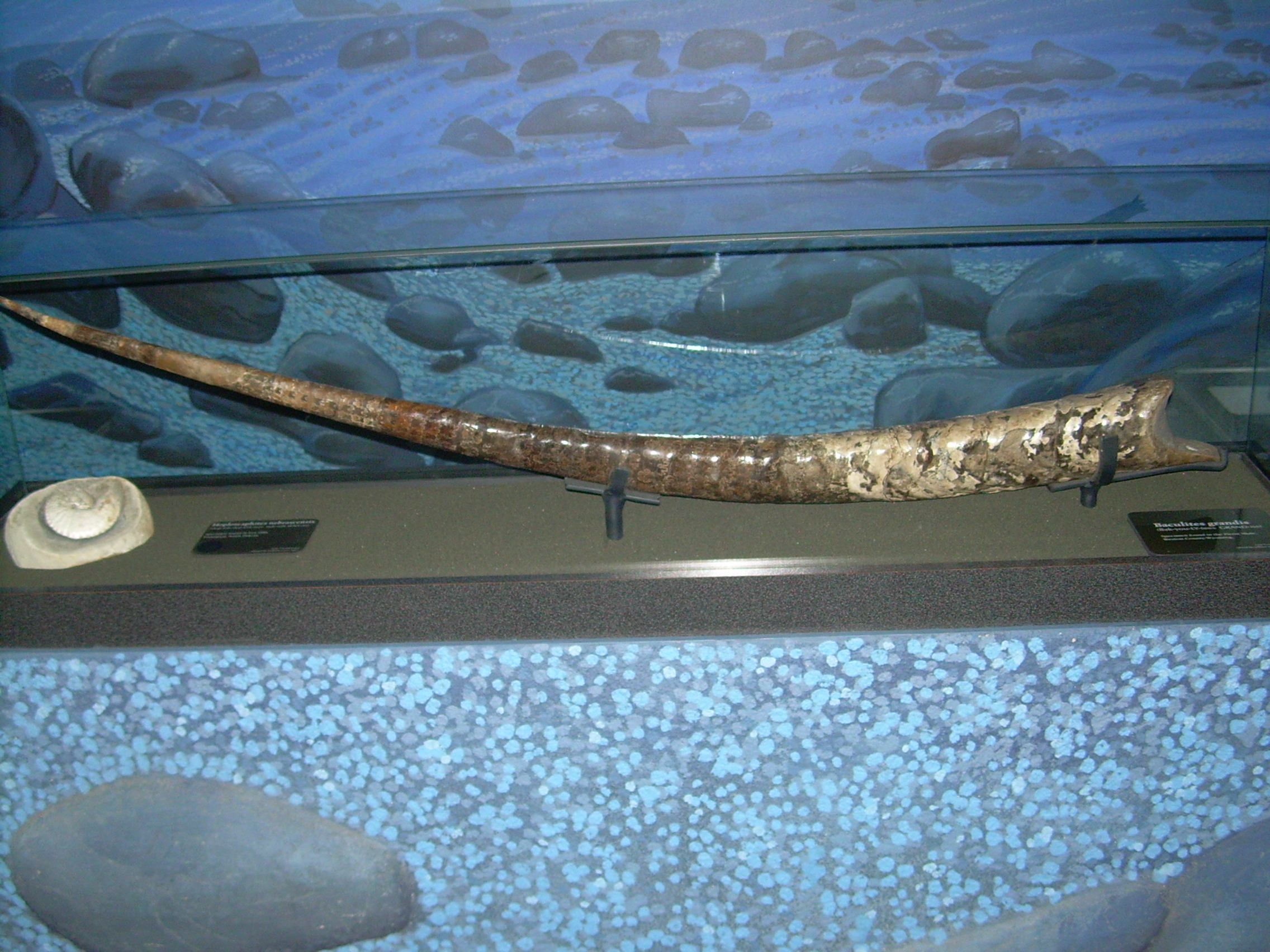
- Fossilized shell of the Late Cretaceous ammonoid cephalopod Baculites
  †Baculites
  - †Baculites calamus
- Barbatia
  - †Barbatia tramitensis
- †Barrancapus
- †Batrachopus
  - †Batrachopus deweyi
- †Bellifusus
  - †Bellifusus gracilistriatus
  - †Bellifusus willistoni – or unidentified comparable form
- †Beudanticeras
  - †Beudanticeras victoris
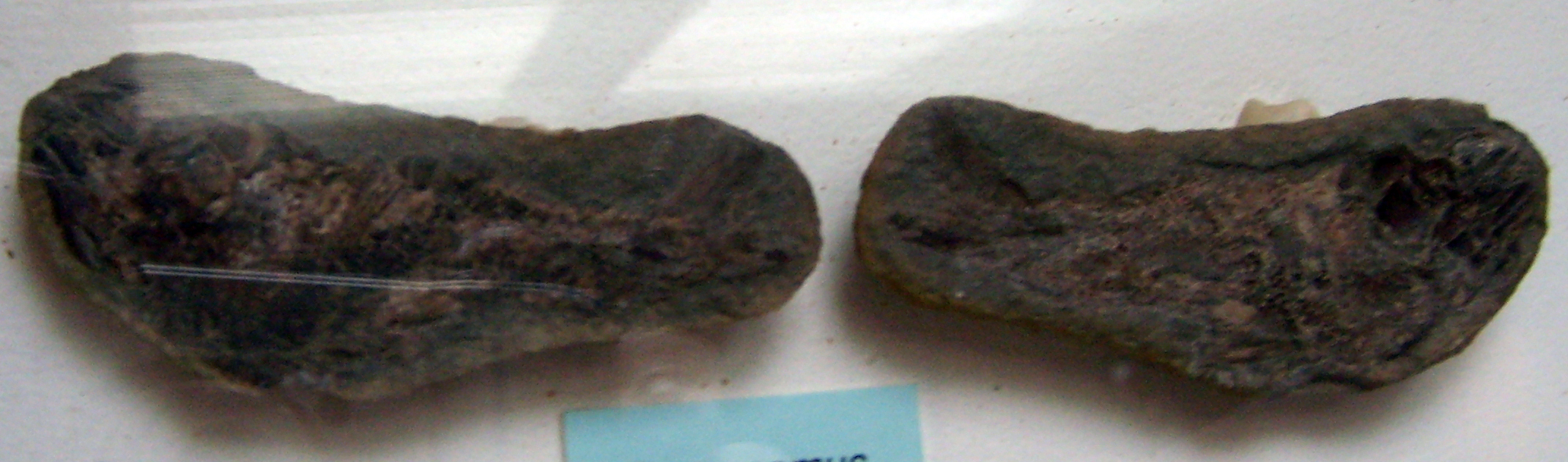
- Fossil slab and counterslab of the bony fish Boreosomus
  †Boreosomus – tentative report
- †Borissiakoceras
- †Borrissiakoceras
  - †Borrissiakoceras orbiculatum
- Brachiodontes
  - †Brachiodontes filisculptus
- †Brachychirotherium
- †Brasilichnium – or unidentified comparable form
- †Breviarca – tentative report
- †Burroceras
  - †Burroceras clydense
  - †Burroceras transitorium

== C ==
- Cadulus
  - †Cadulus praetenuis
- †Calamites
- †Calamophylliopsis
  - †Calamophylliopsis sandbergeri
- †Calsoyasuchus – type locality for genus
  - †Calsoyasuchus valliceps – type locality for species
- †Calycoceras
  - †Calycoceras naviculare
- †Calyptosuchus
  - †Calyptosuchus wellesi
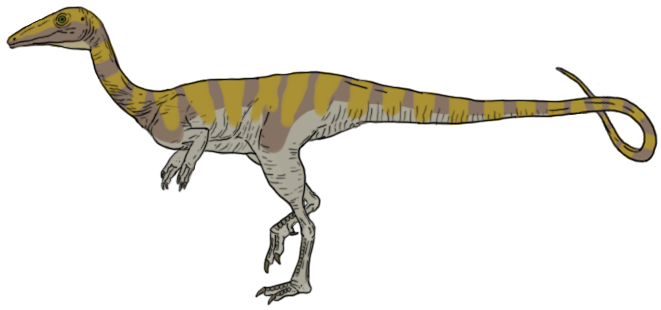
- Restoration of the Late Triassic theropod dinosaur Camposaurus
  †Camposaurus – type locality for genus
  - †Camposaurus arizonensis – type locality for species
- †Camptonectes
  - †Camptonectes A – informal
  - †Camptonectes B – informal
  - †Camptonectes platessa
- †Caprina
- †Caprinuloidea
  - †Caprinuloidea gracilis
- Carota
  - †Carota dalli
- Caryocorbula
  - †Caryocorbula nematophora
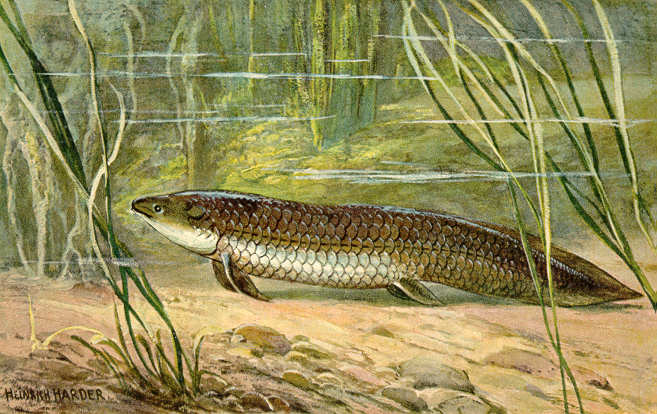
- Life restoration of the Late Triassic-Eocene lungfish Ceratodus
  †Ceratodus
- †Cerithioderma
  - †Cerithioderma darcyi – type locality for species
  - †Cerithioderma occidentalis
- Cerithiopsis
  - †Cerithiopsis sohli – type locality for species
- Charonia – tentative report
  - †Charonia kanabense
  - †Charonia soozi – type locality for species
- †Chatterjeea
- †Chindesaurus – type locality for genus
  - †Chindesaurus bryansmalli – type locality for species
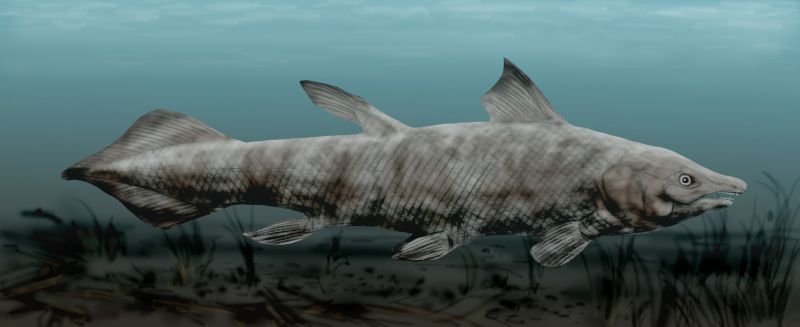
- Restoration of the Late Triassic coelacanth fish Chinlea
  †Chinlea – tentative report
- †Chirotherium
  - †Chirotherium barthii
  - †Chirotherium rex – type locality for species
  - †Chirotherium sickleri
- Chlamys
  - †Chlamys thompsoni
- †Choffaticeras
  - †Choffaticeras pavillieri – or unidentified comparable form
- †Chondrodonta
- †Cibolaites
  - †Cibolaites molenaari
- †Cionichthyes
- †Cionichthys – or unidentified comparable form
- †Coalcomana
  - †Coalcomana ramosa
- †Coelophysis
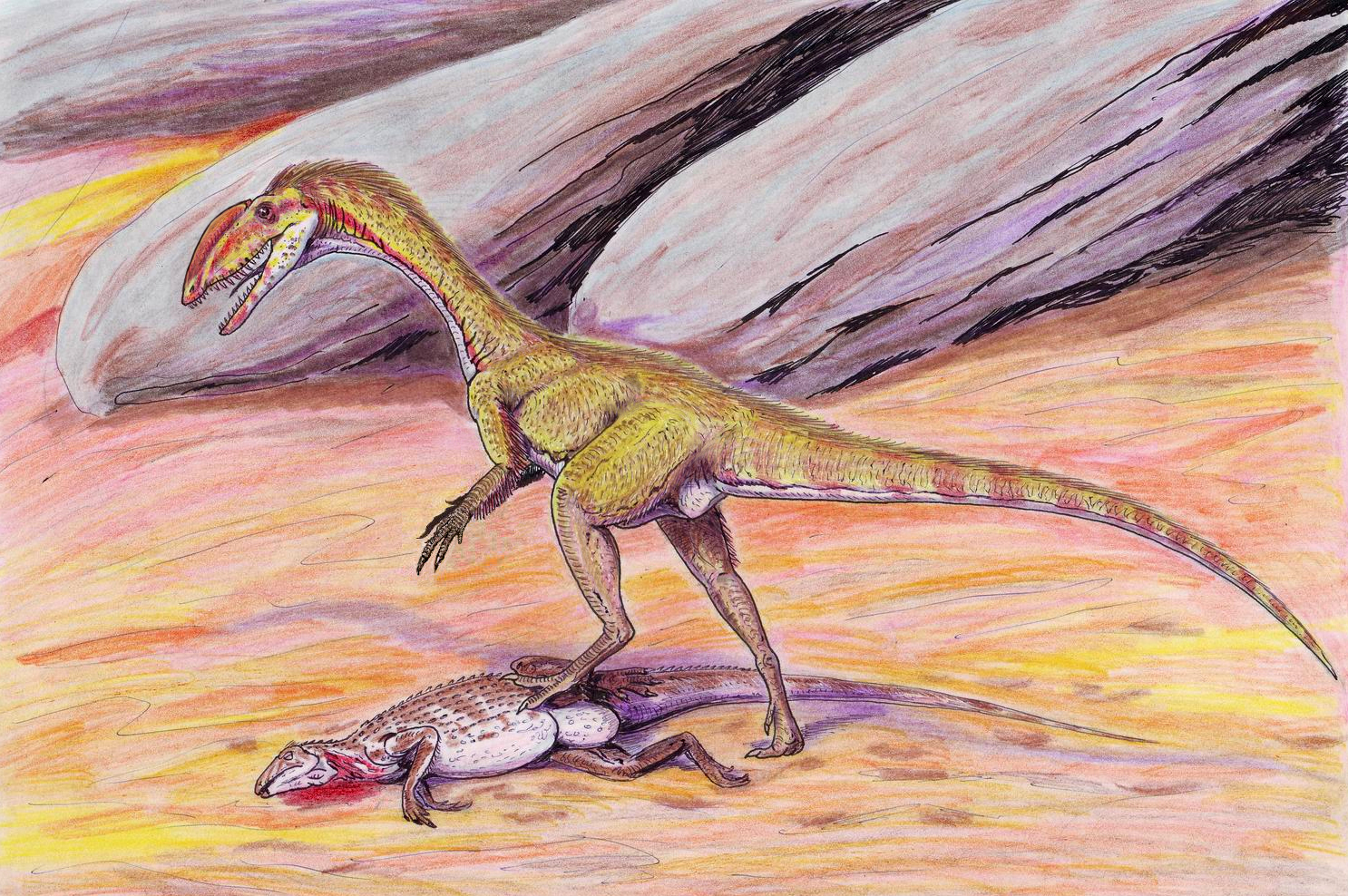
  - Life restoration of Coelophysis kayentakatae
    †Coelophysis kayentakatae – type locality for species
- †Collignoniceras
  - †Collignoniceras carolinum – or unidentified related form
  - †Collignoniceras woollgari
- †Colognathus
  - †Colognathus obscurus
- †Colombiceras – tentative report
  - †Colombiceras brumale
- Corbula
  - †Corbula kanabensis
- †Cosgriffius – type locality for genus
  - †Cosgriffius campi – type locality for species
- †Craginia
  - †Craginia turriformis
- †Craniscus
  - †Craniscus hesperius – type locality for species
- Crassatella
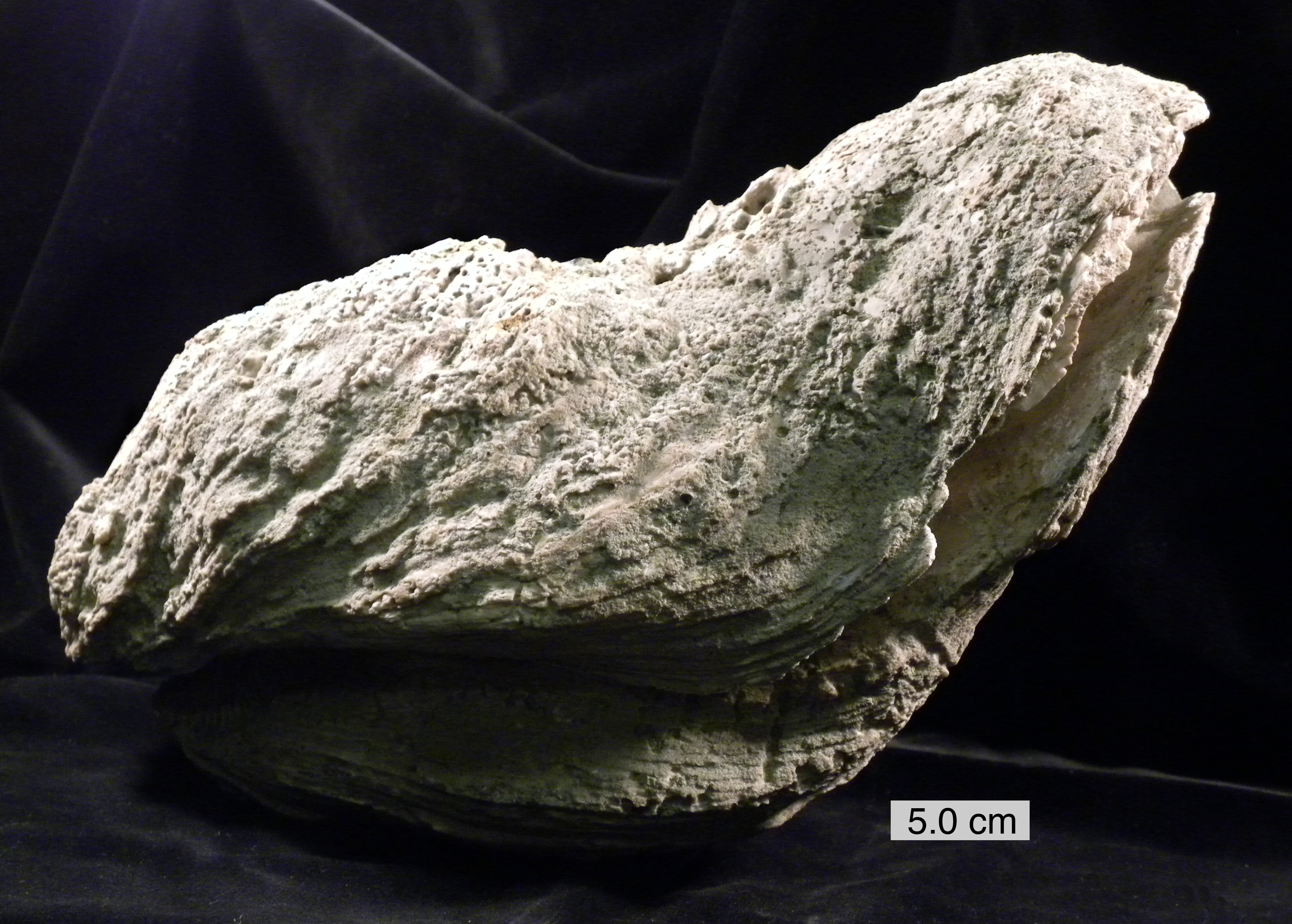
- Fossilized shell of the Cretaceous-modern oyster Crassostrea
  Crassostrea
  - †Crassostrea soleniscus
- †Crosbysaurus
  - †Crosbysaurus harrisae
- Cucullaea
  - †Cucullaea depressa
  - †Cucullaea stephensoni
- †Cunningtoniceras
  - †Cunningtoniceras novimexicanum
- Cuspidaria
  - †Cuspidaria alaeformis
- †Cyclorisma
  - †Cyclorisma orbiculata
- †Cyclothyris
  - †Cyclothyris americana – type locality for species
- Cylichna
- †Cylinodrotruncatum
  - †Cylinodrotruncatum spp.
- †Cymbophora
  - †Cymbophora emmonsi
  - †Cymbophora huerfanensis
  - †Cymbophora utahensis
- †Cyprimeria
  - †Cyprimeria cyprimeriformis

== D ==
- †Dakotacorbula
  - †Dakotacorbula senecta
- †Dechellyia
  - †Dechellyia gormani – type locality for species
- †Dentalium
- †Deshayesites – tentative report
  - †Deshayesites butleri
- †Desmatochelys
  - †Desmatochelys lowi
- †Desmatosuchus
  - †Desmatosuchus haplocerus
  - †Desmatosuchus spurensis
- †Dilophosauripus – type locality for genus
  - †Dilophosauripus williamsi – type locality for species
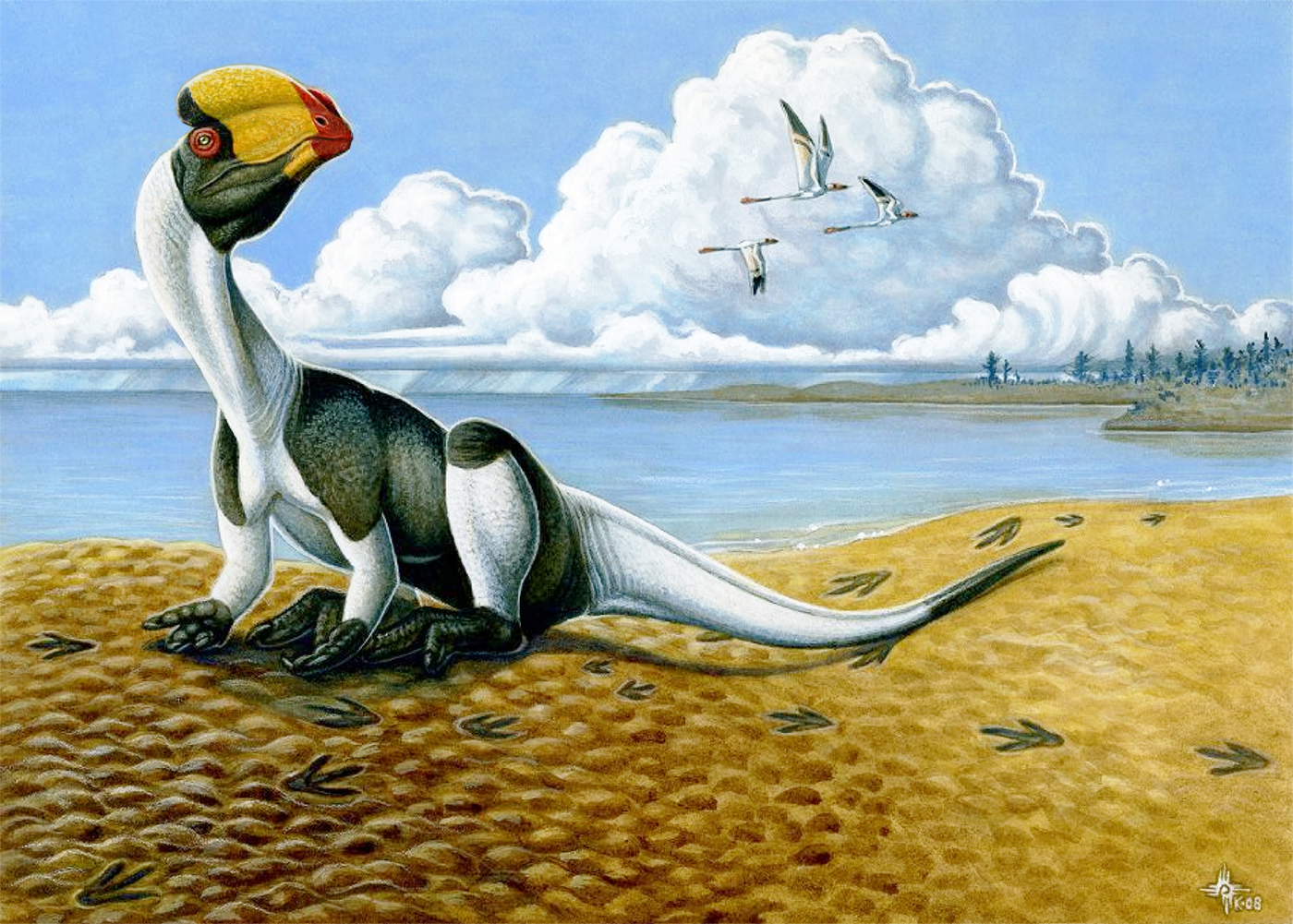
- Life restoration of the Early Jurassic theropod dinosaur Dilophosaurus resting
  †Dilophosaurus
  - †Dilophosaurus wetherilli – type locality for species
- †Dinnebitodon – type locality for genus
  - †Dinnebitodon amarali – type locality for species
- †Dinnetherium – type locality for genus
  - †Dinnetherium nezorum – type locality for species
- Discinisca
- †Dolicholatirus – tentative report
- †Drepanocheilus
  - †Drepanocheilus ruidium
- †Drepanochilus
  - †Drepanochilus ruidium
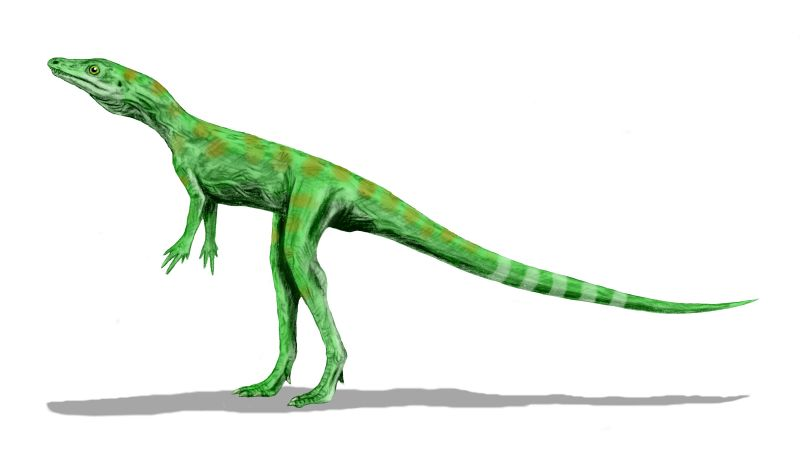
- Restoration of the Late Triassic dinosaur relative Dromomeron
  †Dromomeron
  - †Dromomeron gregorii
- †Dufrenoyia
  - †Dufrenoyia compitalis
  - †Dufrenoyia joserita
  - †Dufrenoyia justinae

== E ==
- †Edentosuchus – tentative report
  - †Edentosuchus undescribed species – informal
  - †Edentosuchus undescribed species 1 – informal
  - †Edentosuchus undescribed species 2 – informal
- Elliptio
- †Entolium
  - †Entolium gregarium
- †Eoacteon – tentative report
- †Eocaecilia – type locality for genus
  - †Eocaecilia micropodia – type locality for species
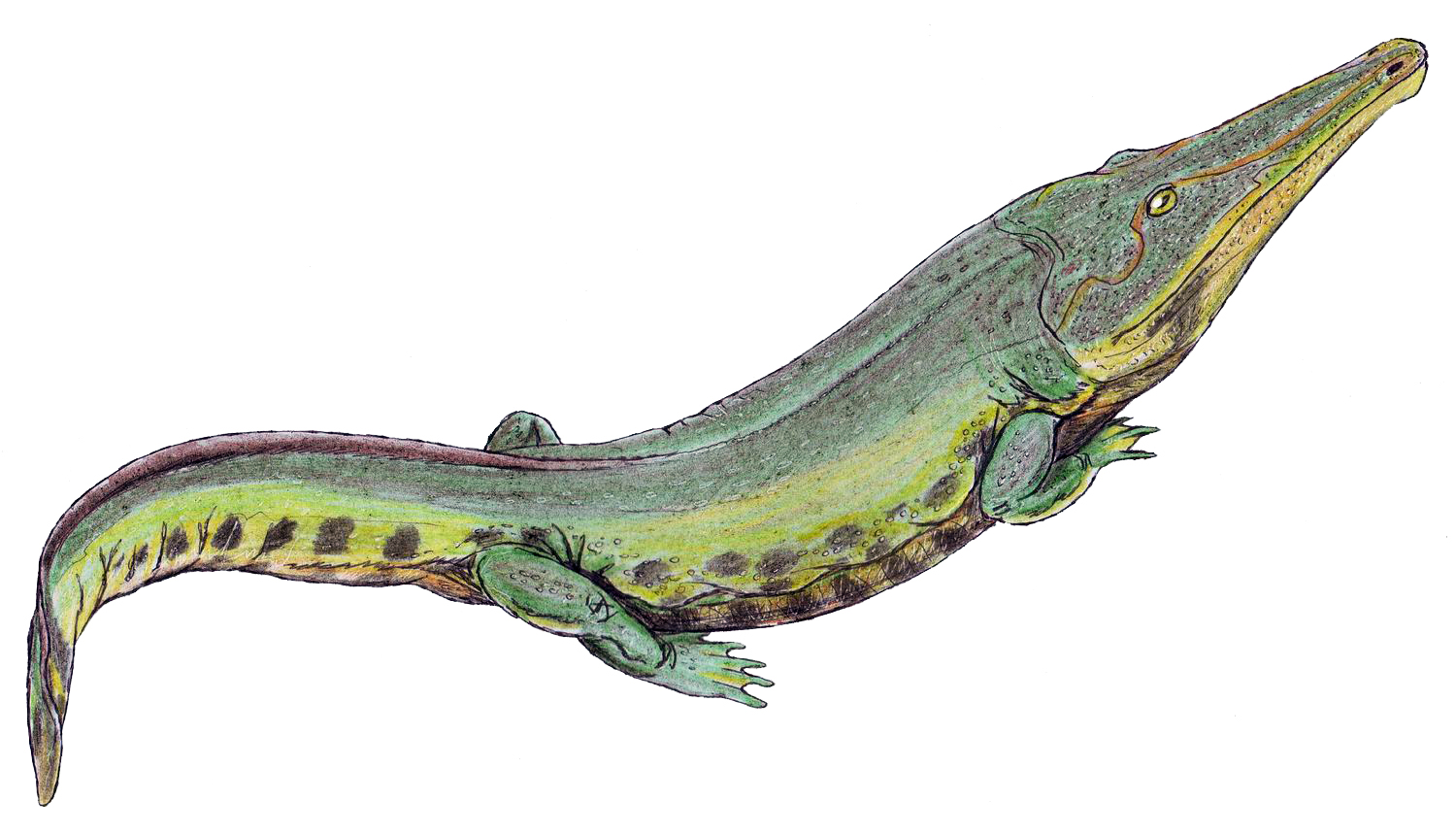
- Restoration of the Middle Triassic amphibian Eocyclotosaurus
  †Eocyclotosaurus
  - †Eocyclotosaurus wellesi – type locality for species
- †Eopneumatosuchus – type locality for genus
  - †Eopneumatosuchus colberti – type locality for species
- †Eucalycoceras
  - †Eucalycoceras pentagonum
- †Eulima – tentative report
  - †Eulima funicula
- †Eunaticina
  - †Eunaticina textilis
- †Euomphaloceras
  - †Euomphaloceras irregulare
  - †Euomphaloceras septemseriatum
- †Euspira
  - †Euspira concinna
  - †Euspira stantoni – type locality for species
- †Exogyra
  - †Exogyra acroumbonata
  - †Exogyra lancha
  - †Exogyra levis
  - †Exogyra olisiponensis

== F ==
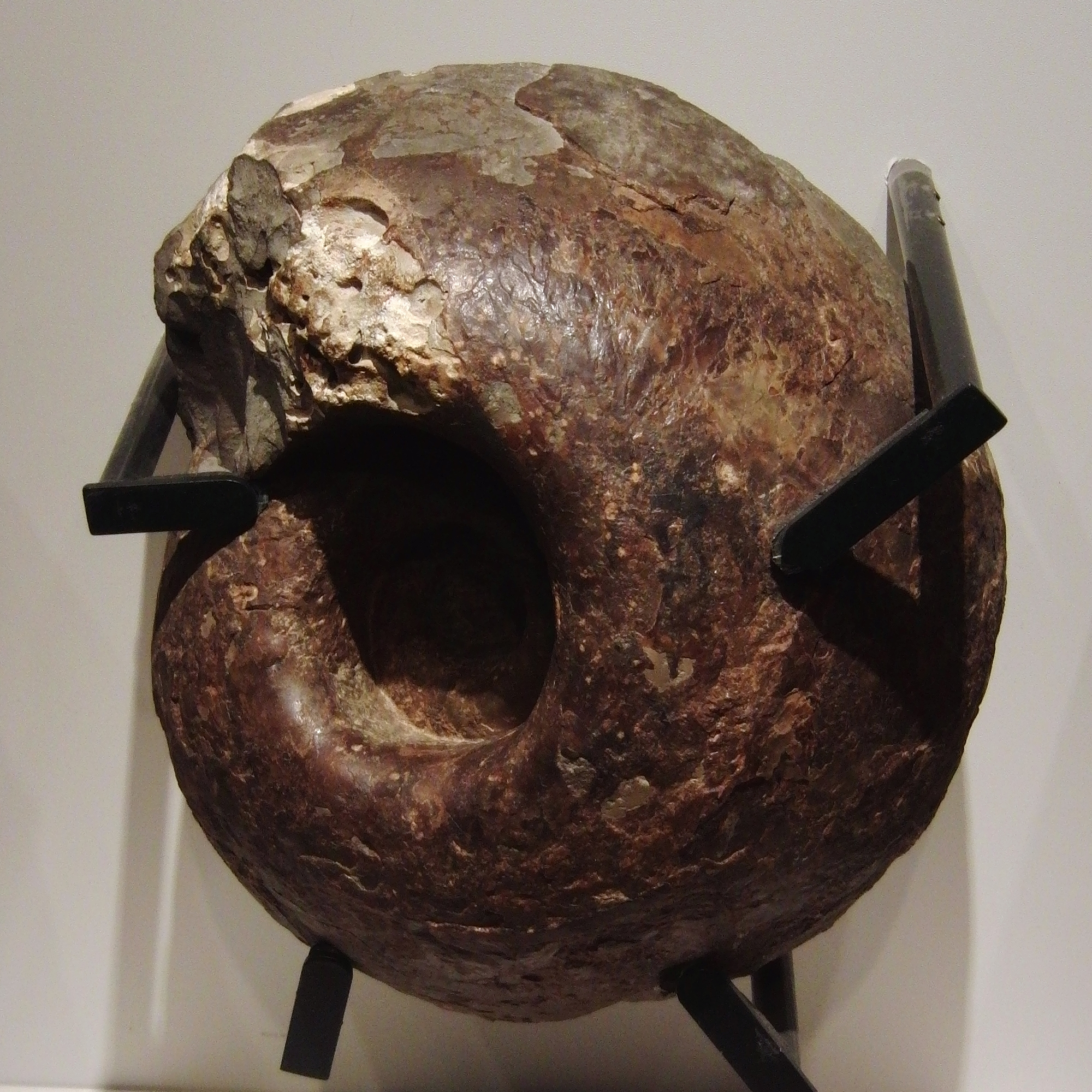
- Fossilized shell of the Late Cretaceous ammonoid cephalopod Fagesia
  †Fagesia
  - †Fagesia catinus
- †Felixigyra
- †Flemingostrea
  - †Flemingostrea prudentia
- †Fulpia
  - †Fulpia pinguis

== G ==
- †Gemmarcula
  - †Gemmarcula arizonensis – type locality for species
  - †Gemmarcula menardi
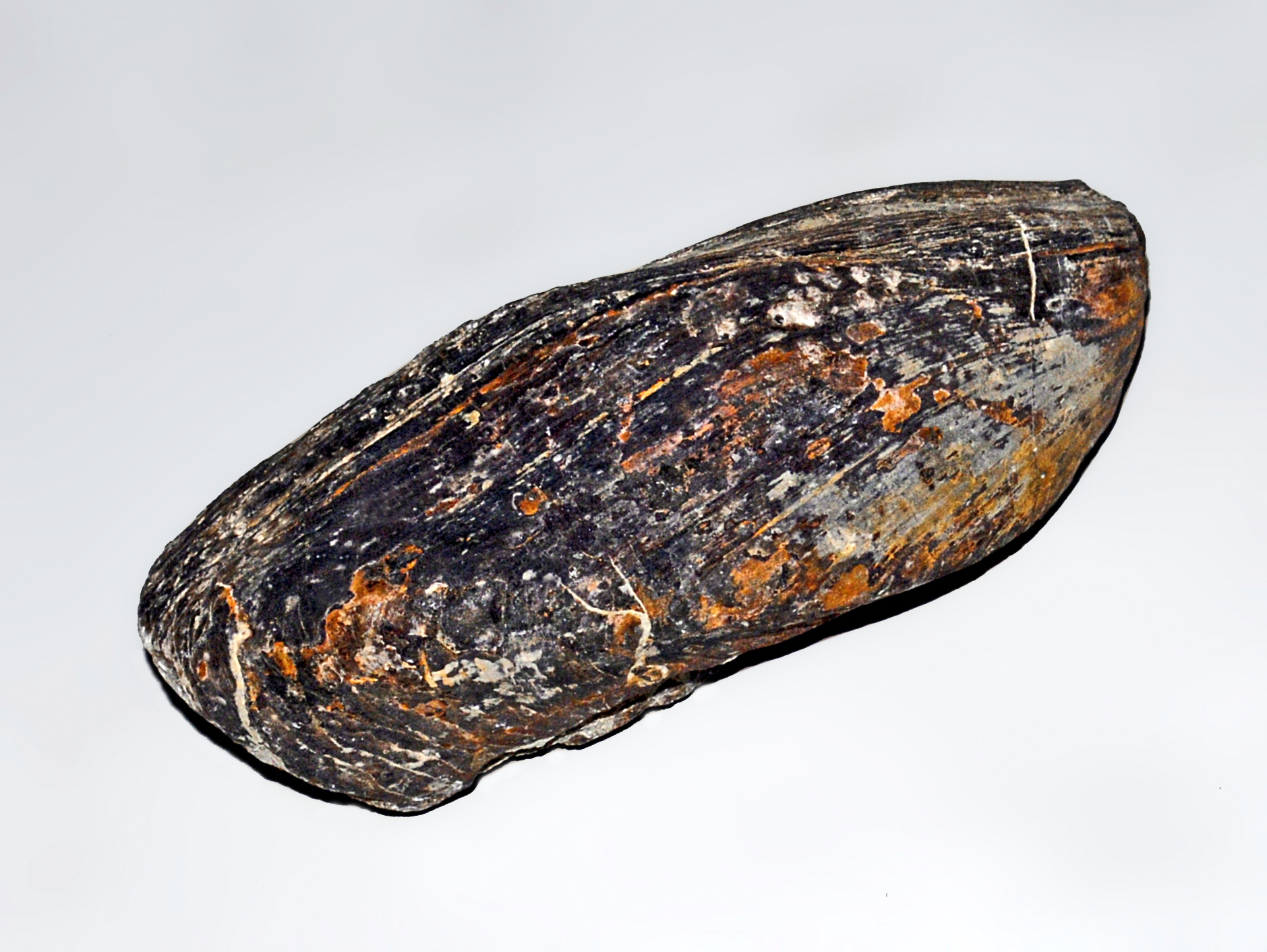
- Fossilized shell of the Carboniferous-Eocene bivalve Gervillia
  †Gervillia
  - †Gervillia cholla
  - †Gervillia heinemani
  - †Gervillia navajovus – type locality for species
  - †Gervillia rasori
- Ginkgo
- †Grallator
  - †Grallator cursorius
- †Granocardium
  - †Granocardium trite
- †Graphidula
  - †Graphidula walcotti
- †Gregania – tentative report
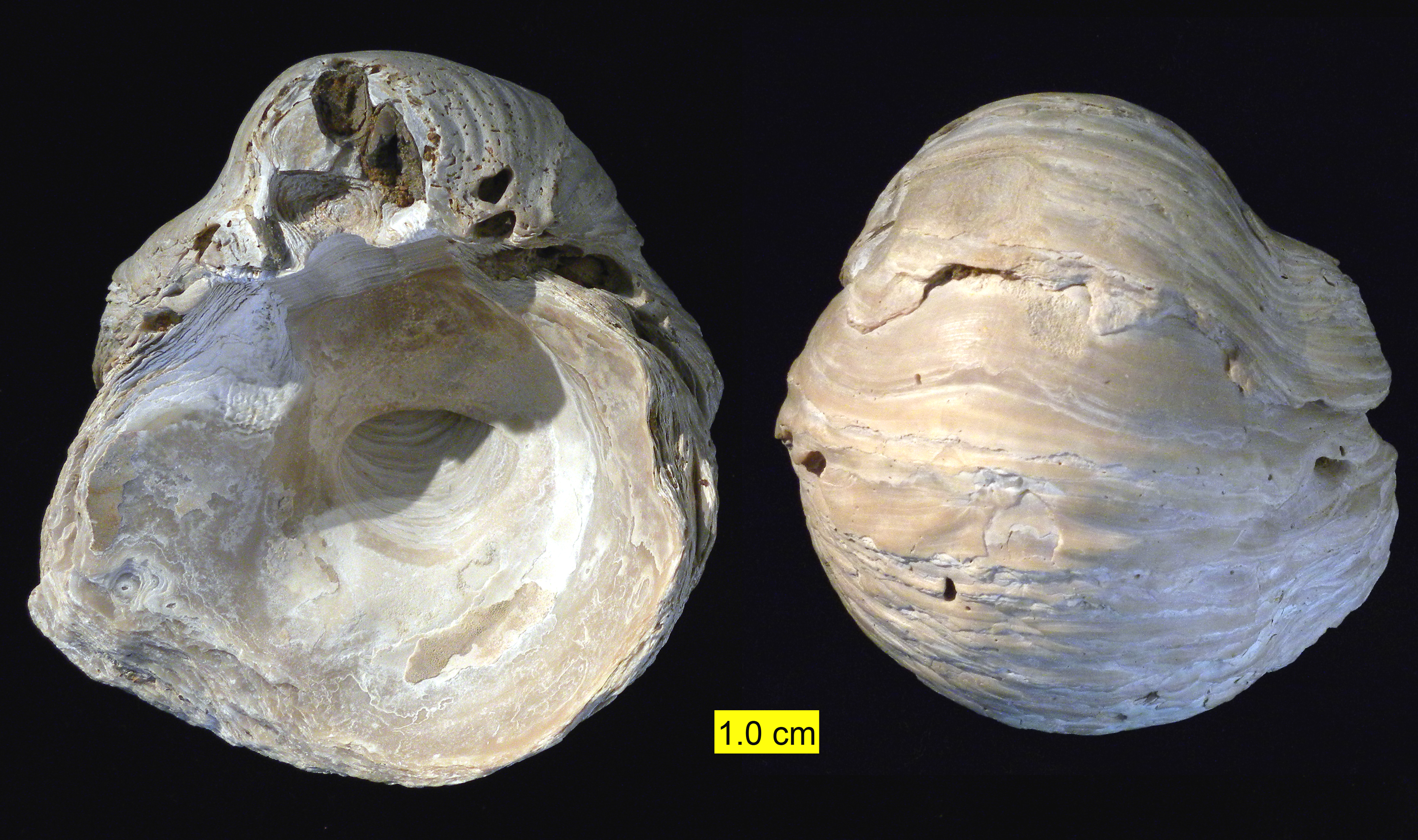
- Interior and exterior of a fossilized shell of the Late Triassic-Eocene marine bivalve Gryphaea
  †Gryphaea
- †Gryphaeostrea
  - †Gryphaeostrea elderi – type locality for species
  - †Gryphaeostrea nationsi – type locality for species
- Gyrodes
  - †Gyrodes conradi
  - †Gyrodes depressa
  - †Gyrodes tramitensis – or unidentified comparable form
- †Gyrolepis
- †Gyrotropis
  - †Gyrotropis nationsi – type locality for species

== H ==
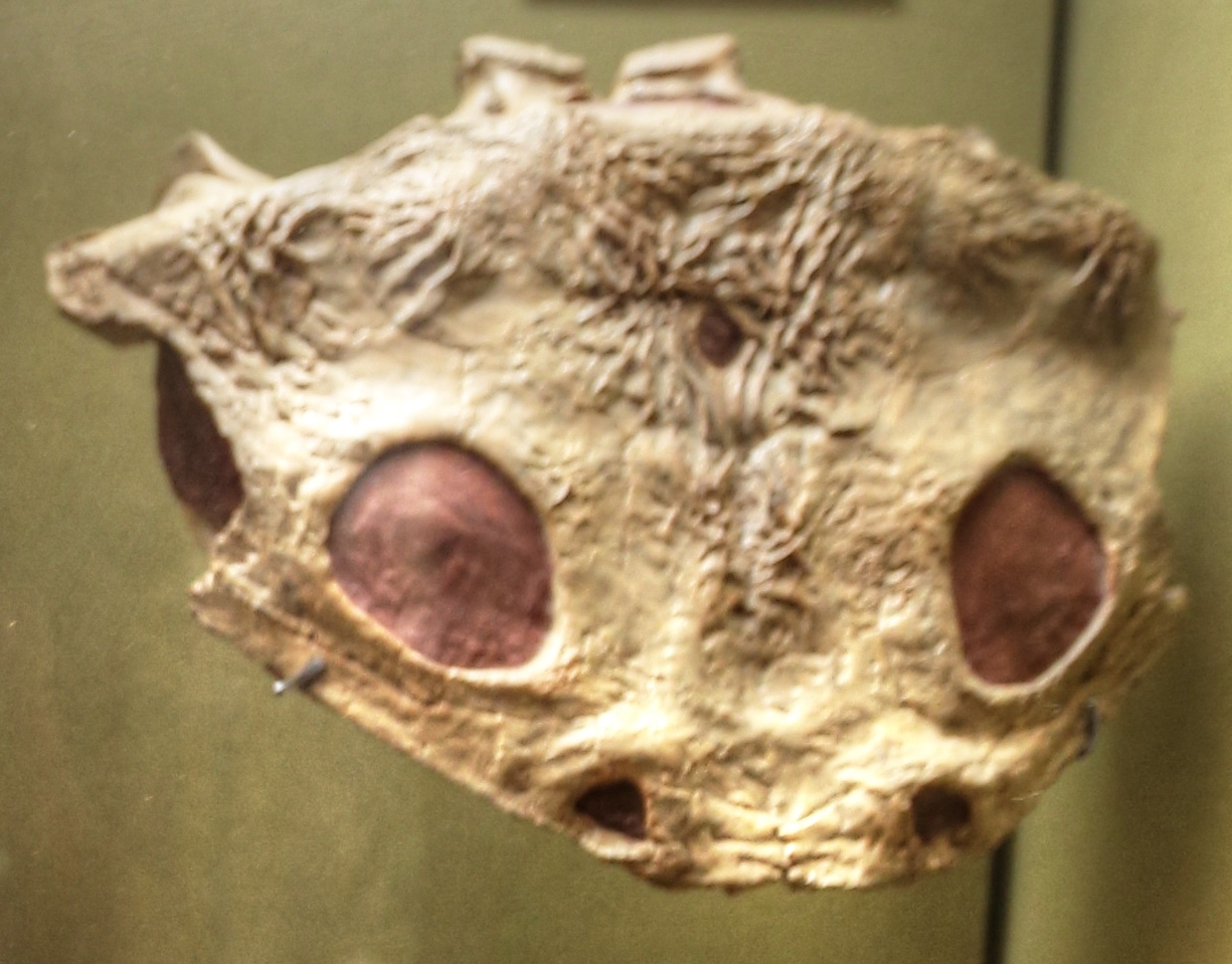
- Fossilized skull of the Middle Triassic amphibian Hadrokkosaurus
  †Hadrokkosaurus – type locality for genus
  - †Hadrokkosaurus bradyi – type locality for species
- †Hamites
  - †Hamites simplex
- †Hamulus
- Hemiaster
  - †Hemiaster jacksoni – or unidentified comparable form
- †Hesperosuchus – type locality for genus
  - †Hesperosuchus agilis – type locality for species
- Homarus
- †Hopiichnus – type locality for genus
  - †Hopiichnus shingi – type locality for species
- †Hybodus

== I ==
- †Immunitoceras
  - †Immunitoceras immunitum
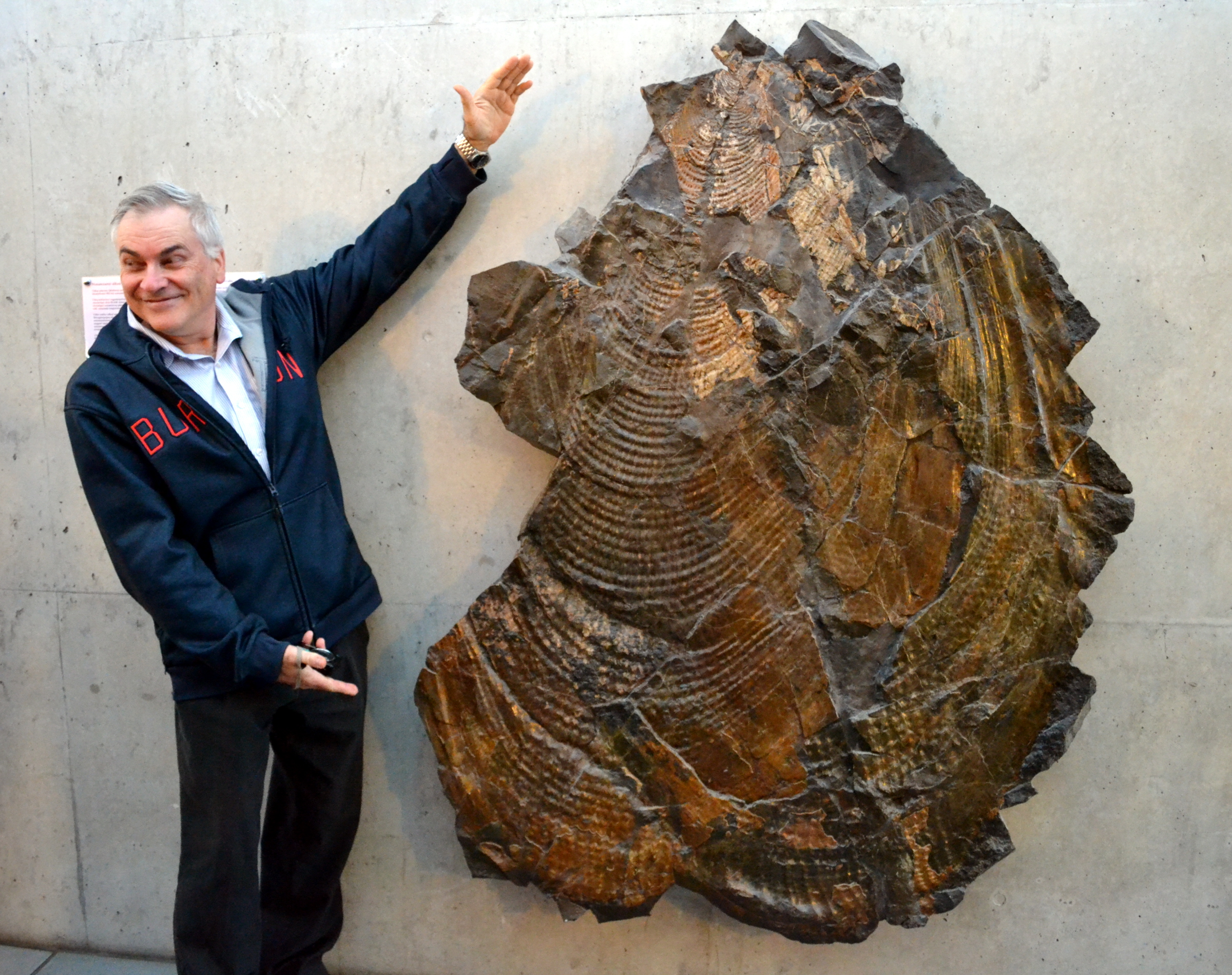
- Fossilized shell of the Early Jurassic-Late Cretaceous marine bivalve Inoceramus with a human indicating its size
  †Inoceramus
  - †Inoceramus corpulentas
  - †Inoceramus dimidius – or unidentified comparable form
  - †Inoceramus flavus
  - †Inoceramus heinzi – or unidentified related form
  - †Inoceramus lamarcki
  - †Inoceramus nodai
  - †Inoceramus pictus
  - †Inoceramus tenuistriatus() – tentative report
- †Isochirotherium
  - †Isochirotherium coltoni – type locality for species
  - †Isochirotherium marshalli

== K ==
- †Kamerunoceras
  - †Kamerunoceras turoniense
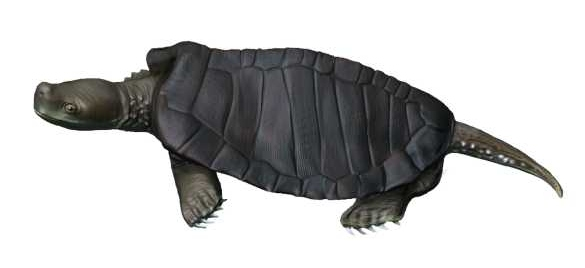
- Restoration of the Early Jurassic turtle Kayentachelys
  †Kayentachelys – type locality for genus
  - †Kayentachelys aprix – type locality for species
- †Kayentapus – type locality for genus
  - †Kayentapus hopii – type locality for species
- †Kayentasuchus – type locality for genus
  - †Kayentasuchus walkeri – type locality for species
- †Kayentatherium – type locality for genus
  - †Kayentatherium wellesi – type locality for species
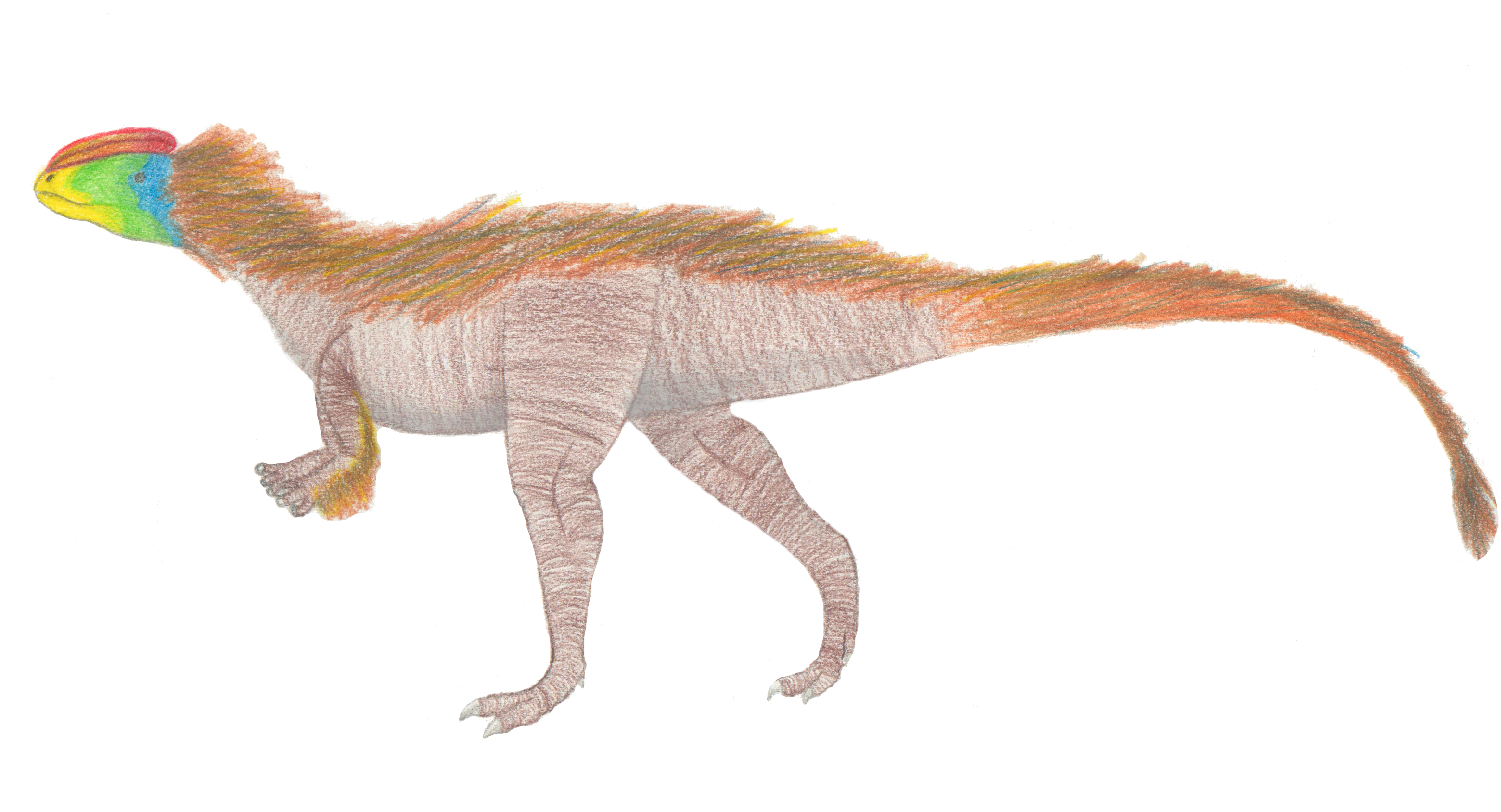
- Life restoration of the Early Jurassic theropod dinosaur Kayentavenator
  †Kayentavenator – type locality for genus
  - †Kayentavenator elysiae – type locality for species
- †Kazanskyella
  - †Kazanskyella arizonica
- †Koskinonodon
  - †Koskinonodon perfectus
- †Koupichnium – probable lapsus calami of Kouphichnium
- †Kraterokheirodon – type locality for genus
  - †Kraterokheirodon colberti – type locality for species
- †Kummelonautilus

== L ==
- †Lasalichthys – or unidentified comparable form
- Laternula
  - †Laternula lineata
- †Legumen
  - †Legumen ligula – or unidentified comparable form
- Lepisosteus
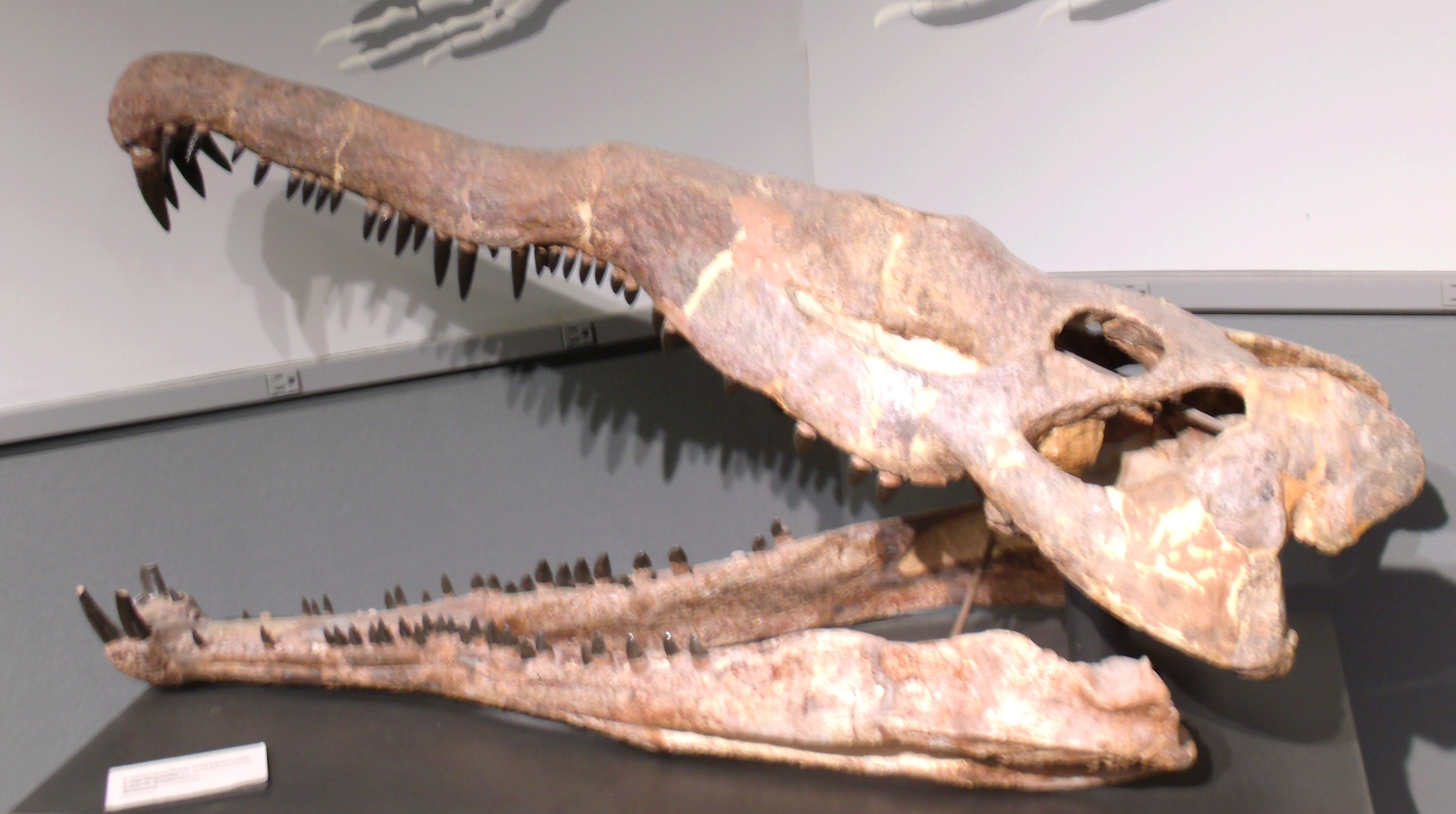
- Fossilized skull of the Late Triassic phytosaur Leptosuchus
  †Leptosuchus
  - †Leptosuchus crosbiensis
- †Levicerithium
  - †Levicerithium basicostae
  - †Levicerithium micronema – tentative report
  - †Levicerithium timberanum – or unidentified comparable form
- Lima
  - †Lima cholla
  - †Lima espinal
  - †Lima muralensis
  - †Lima utahensis
- Limatula
  - †Limatula kochi
- †Linearis
  - †Linearis striatimarginata
  - †Linearis whitei
- †Lingula
  - †Lingula subspatula
- †Liopistha
  - †Liopistha meeki
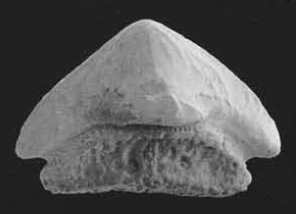
- Electron micrograph of fossilized teeth from the Early Jurassic-Early Cretaceous freshwater shark Lissodus
  †Lissodus – tentative report
- †Lithocodium
- Lithophaga
- †Lonchidion
  - †Lonchidion humblei
- †Longitubus
- Lopha
  - †Lopha bellaplicata
  - †Lopha staufferi
- †Lucina
  - †Lucina subundata
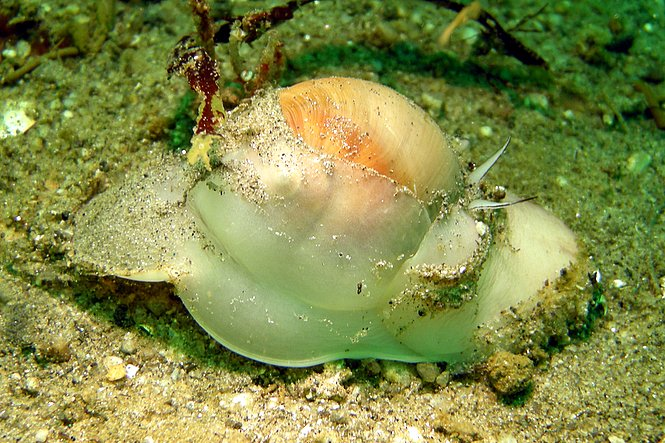
- A living Lunatia moon sea snail
  Lunatia – tentative report
- †Lutema
  - †Lutema hitzi

== M ==
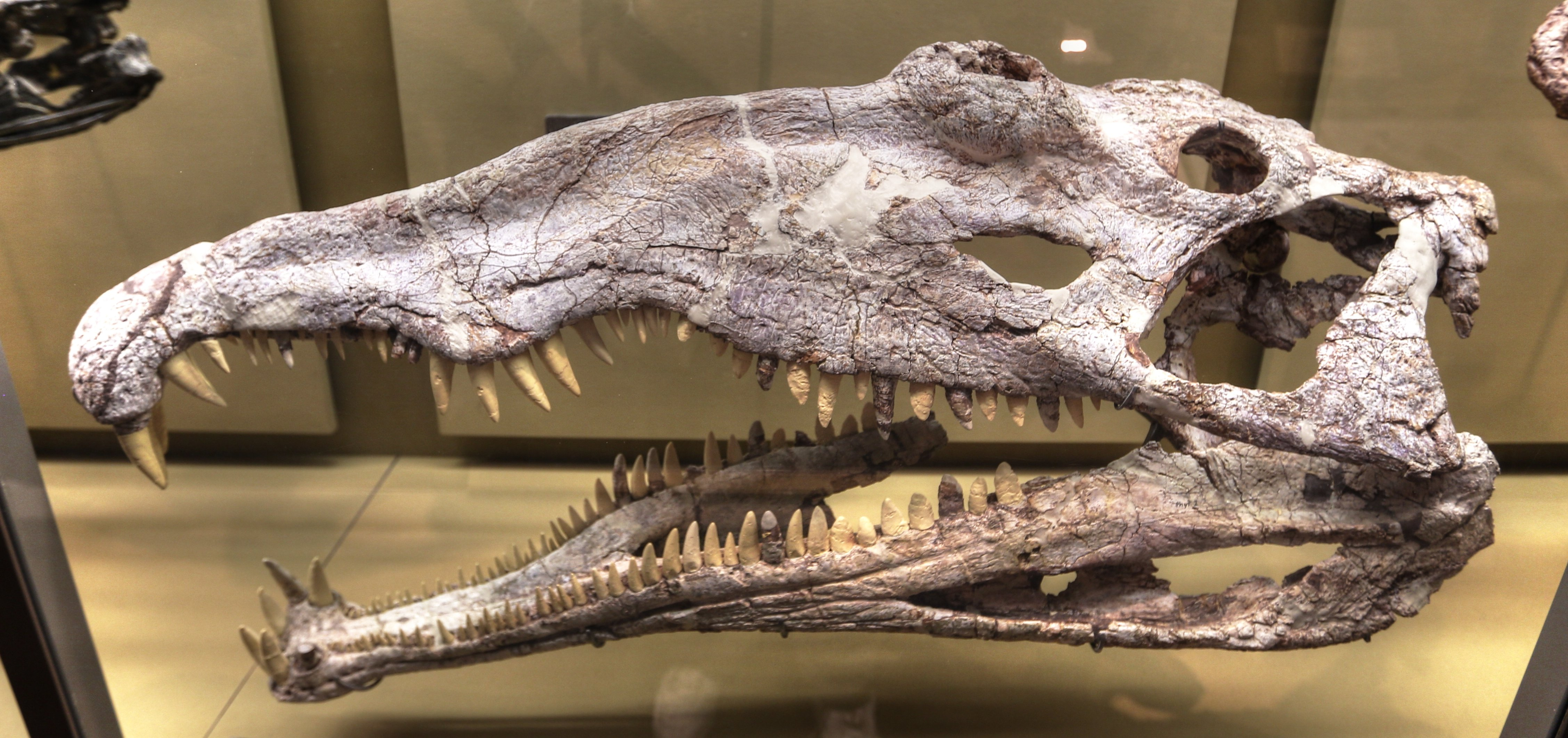
- Fossilized skull of the Late Triassic phytosaur Machaeroprosopus
  †Machaeroprosopus – type locality for genus
  - †Machaeroprosopus buceros
  - †Machaeroprosopus jablonskiae – type locality for species
  - †Machaeroprosopus mccauleyi – type locality for species
  - †Machaeroprosopus pristinus – type locality for species
  - †Machaeroprosopus tenuis – type locality for species
  - †Machaeroprosopus validus – type locality for species
- †Mammillopora
  - †Mammillopora encrusta – type locality for species
- †Mammites
  - †Mammites nodosoides
- †Masculostrobus
  - †Masculostrobus clathratus – type locality for species
- †Mathilia – tentative report
  - †Mathilia ripleyana
- †Meekia
- †Megalosauripus
- †Melvius
- Membranipora – or unidentified comparable form
- †Mesolanites
- †Mesostoma
- †Metaptychoceras
  - †Metaptychoceras reesidei
- †Metoicoceras
  - †Metoicoceras geslinianum
  - †Metoicoceras mosbyense
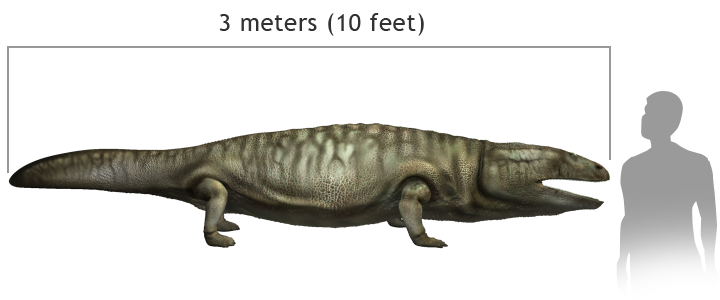
- Life restoration of the Late Triassic amphibian Metoposaurus with an anachronistic human to scale
  †Metoposaurus
  - †Metoposaurus fraasi – type locality for species
- †Microsolena
  - †Microsolena texana
- †Modiolus
  - †Modiolus attenuatus – or unidentified comparable form
  - †Modiolus coloradoensis
  - †Modiolus perryi – type locality for species
- †Moenkopia – type locality for genus
  - †Moenkopia wellesi – type locality for species
- †Monopleura
  - †Monopleura marcida – or unidentified comparable form
- †Moremanoceras
  - †Moremanoceras scotti
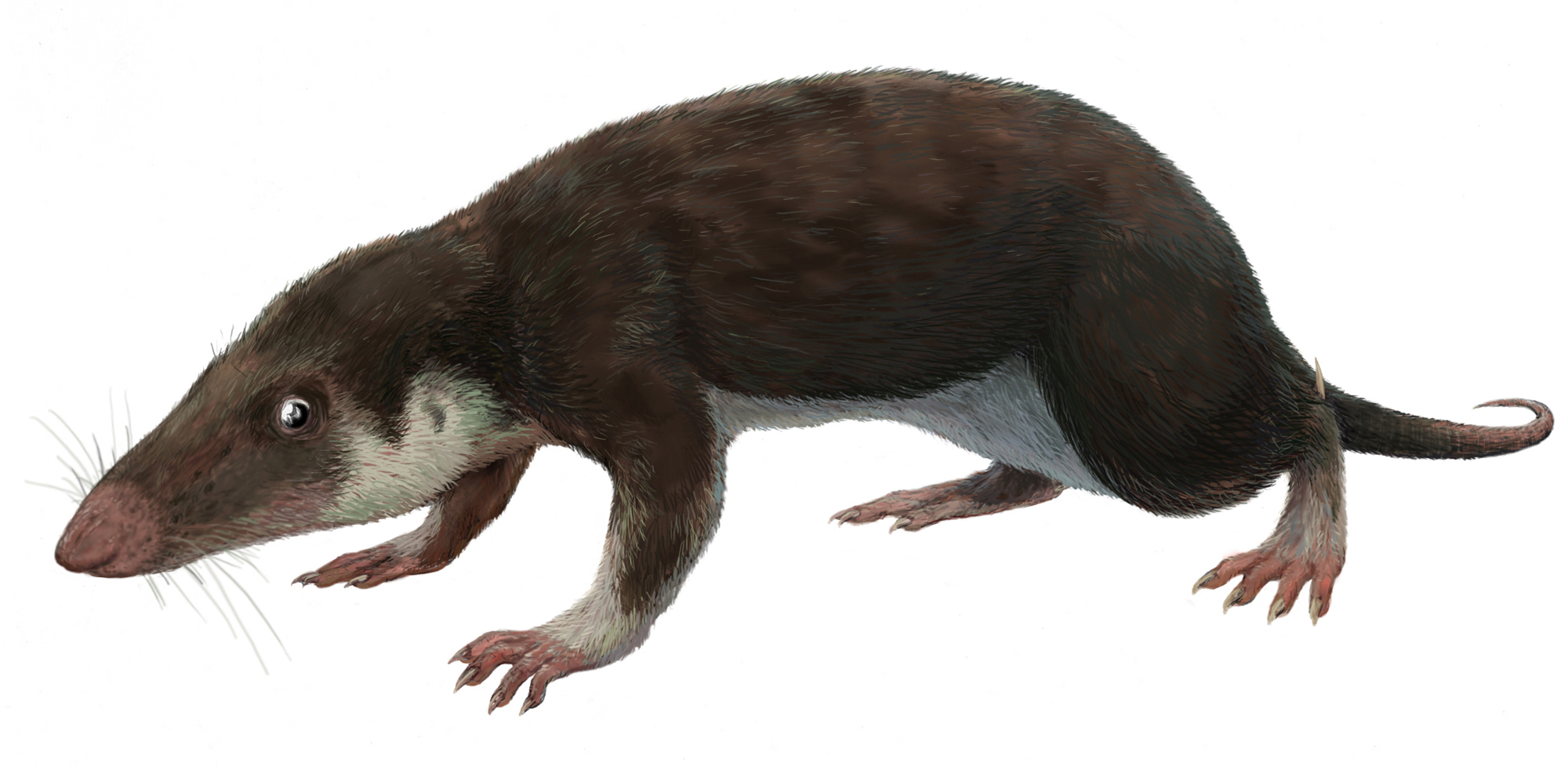
- Life restoration of the Late Triassic-Middle Jurassic synapsid (mammal precursor) Morganucodon
  †Morganucodon
- †Morrowites
- †Mytiloides
  - †Mytiloides columbianus
  - †Mytiloides duplicostasus – or unidentified related form
  - †Mytiloides hercynicus
  - †Mytiloides kossmati
  - †Mytiloides labiatus
  - †Mytiloides latus – or unidentified comparable form
  - †Mytiloides mytiloides
  - †Mytiloides opalensis
  - †Mytiloides submytiloides
- †Mytilus – tentative report

== N ==
- †Nannometoicoceras
  - †Nannometoicoceras acceleratum
- †Navahopus – type locality for genus
  - †Navahopus falcipollex – type locality for species
- †Neithea
  - †Neithea vicinalis
- †Nemodon
- †Neocardioceras
  - †Neocardioceras juddii
  - †Neocardioceras minutum
- †Neoptychites
  - †Neoptychites cephalotus
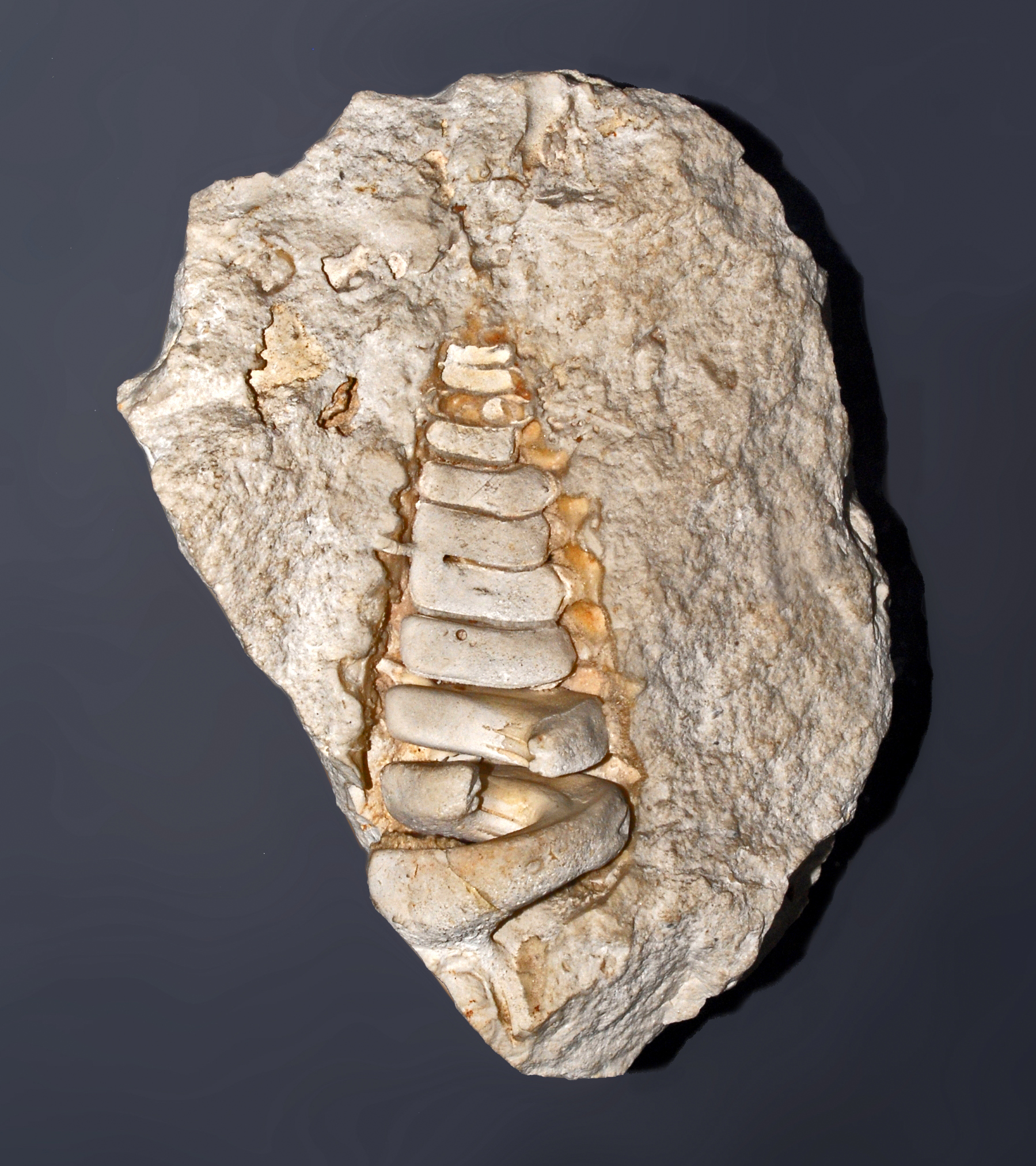
- Fossilized shell of the Jurassic-Cretaceous sea snail Nerinea
  †Nerinea
- Nerita
  - †Nerita spp.
- Neritina
  - †Neritina spp.
- †Nigericeras
  - †Nigericeras ogojaense – or unidentified comparable form
- Nucula
  - †Nucula coloradoensis
- Nuculana
  - †Nuculana mutuata

== O ==
- †Obnixia – type locality for genus
  - †Obnixia thaynesiana
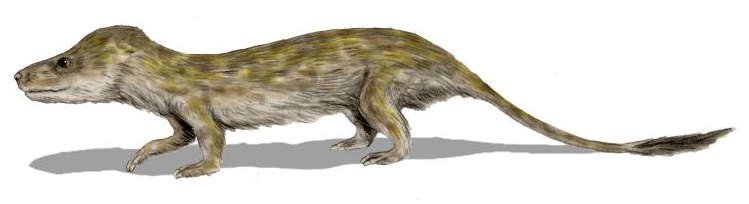
- Restoration of the Late Triassic–Early Jurassic synapsid (mammal precursor) Oligokyphus
  †Oligokyphus
- †Opis
  - †Opis elevata
- †Orbitolina
  - †Orbitolina texana
- Ostrea
  - †Ostrea anomioides
  - †Ostrea edwilsoni
- †Oxytoma
  - †Oxytoma arizonensis – type locality for species

== P ==
- †Pachyrhizodus – or unidentified comparable form
- †Paleopsephea
  - †Paleopsephea arizonensis – type locality for species
- †Paracanthohoplites
  - †Paracanthohoplites meridionalis
- †Parasimilia
  - †Parasimilia spp.
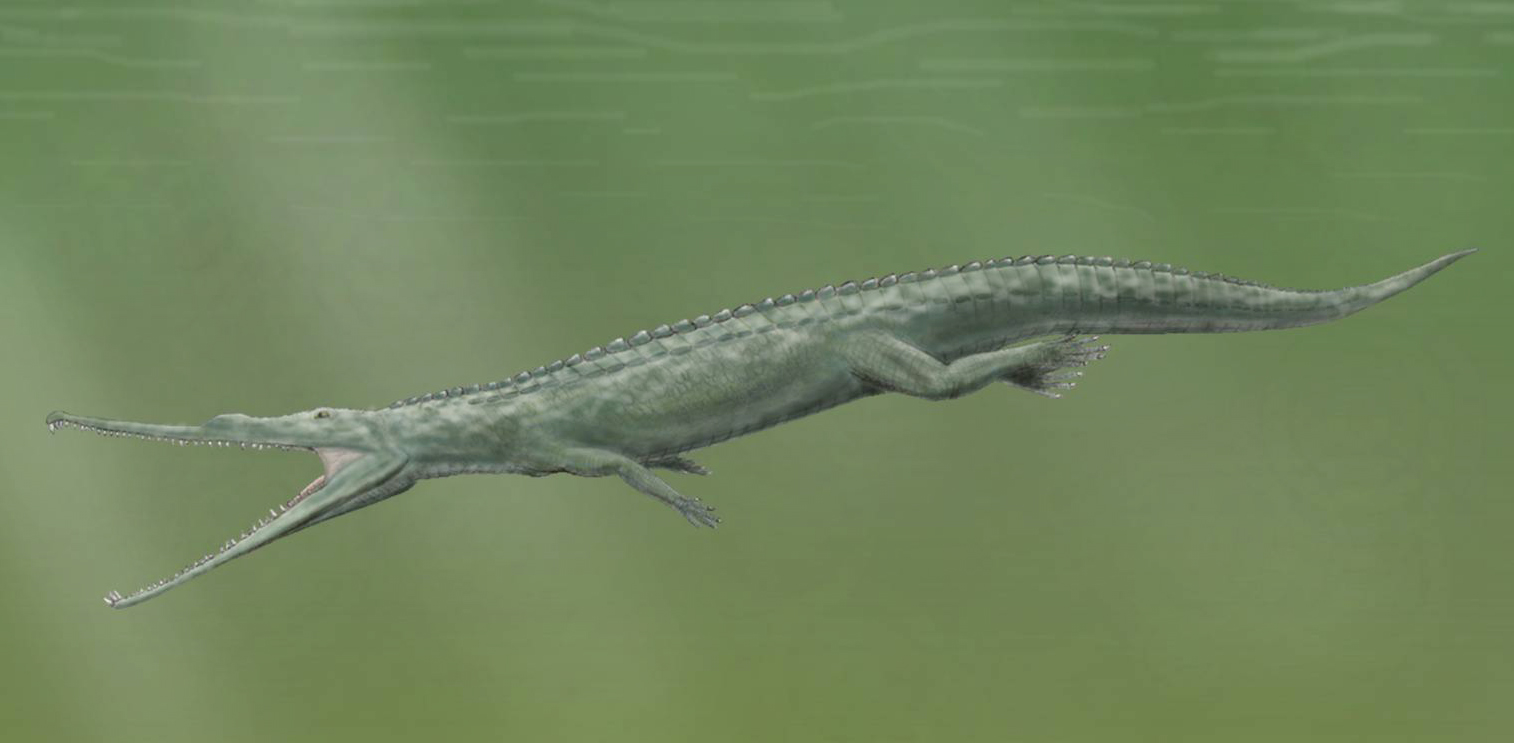
- Life restoration of the Late Triassic phytosaur Parasuchus
  †Parasuchus
- †Paratypothorax
- †Parmicorbula
- †Parrishea
- †Parrishia – type locality for genus
  - †Parrishia mccreai – type locality for species
- Parvilucina
  - †Parvilucina juvenis
- †Pecten
  - †Pecten peregrina
- †Perissoptera
  - †Perissoptera prolabiata
- †Permocalculus
- Petrophyllia
  - †Petrophyllia dartoni
- †Pharodina
  - †Pharodina ferrana
- †Phelopteria
  - †Phelopteria A – informal
  - †Phelopteria B – informal
  - †Phelopteria C – informal
  - †Phelopteria dalli
  - †Phelopteria E – informal
  - †Phelopteria F – informal
  - †Phelopteria gastrodes
  - †Phelopteria minuta
- †Phoebodus
- Pholadomya
  - †Pholadomya coloradoensis
- Physa
  - †Physa reesidei – or unidentified comparable form
- †Pinna
  - †Pinna kauffmani – type locality for species
  - †Pinna petrina
- †Pirsilia
- †Placenticeras
  - †Placenticeras cumminsi
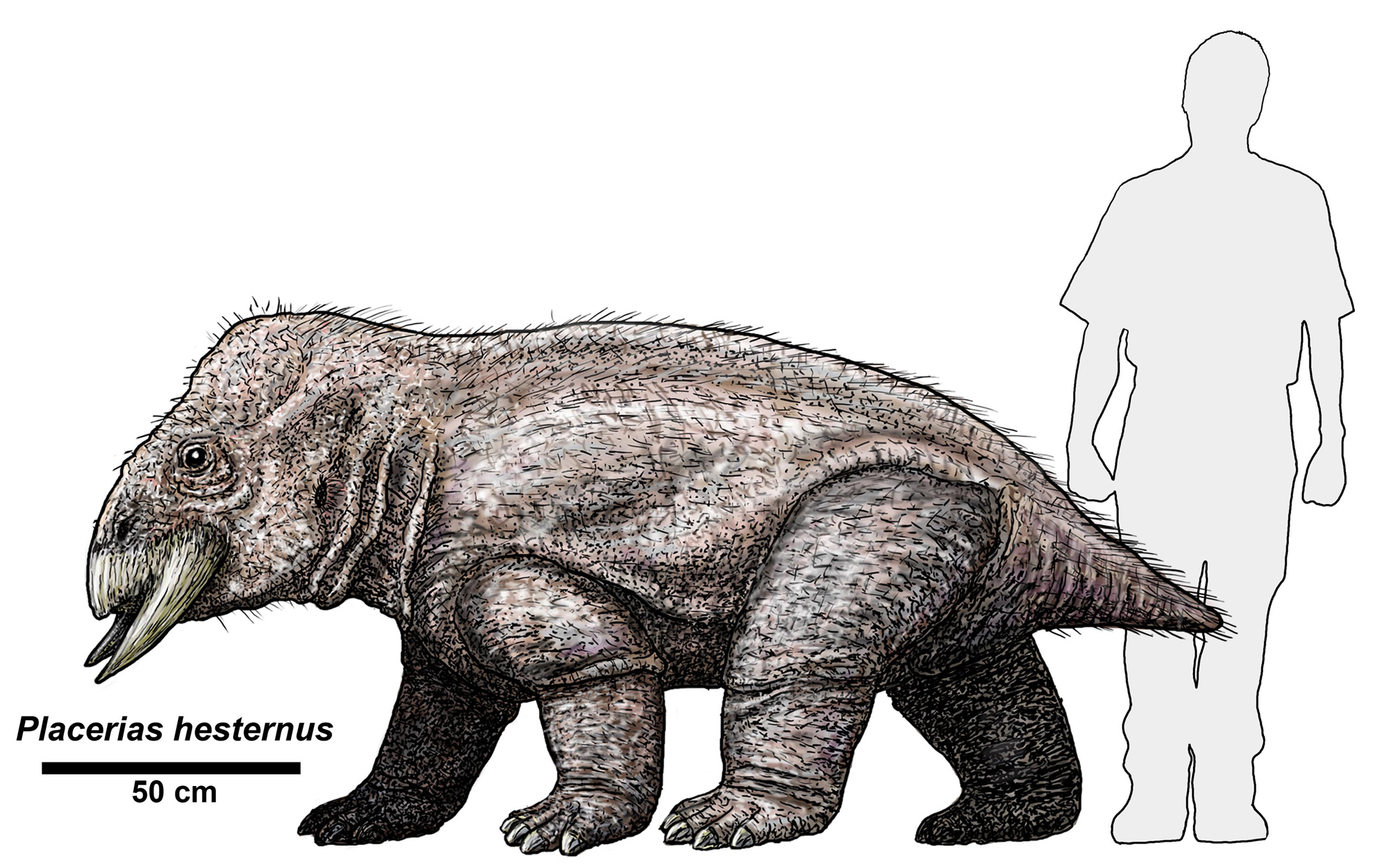
- Restoration of the Late Triassic synapsid (mammal precursor) Placerias with an anachronistic human to scale
  †Placerias – type locality for genus
  - †Placerias hesternus – type locality for species
- †Plastomenus
- †Pleisiopinna – tentative report
- †Pleisopinna – tentative report
- †Pleuriocardia
  - †Pleuriocardia pauperculum
- Plicatula
  - †Plicatula ferryi
  - †Plicatula hydrotheca
- †Pollex – tentative report
- Polydora – tentative report
- †Polystrata
  - †Polystrata alba
- †Polytremacis
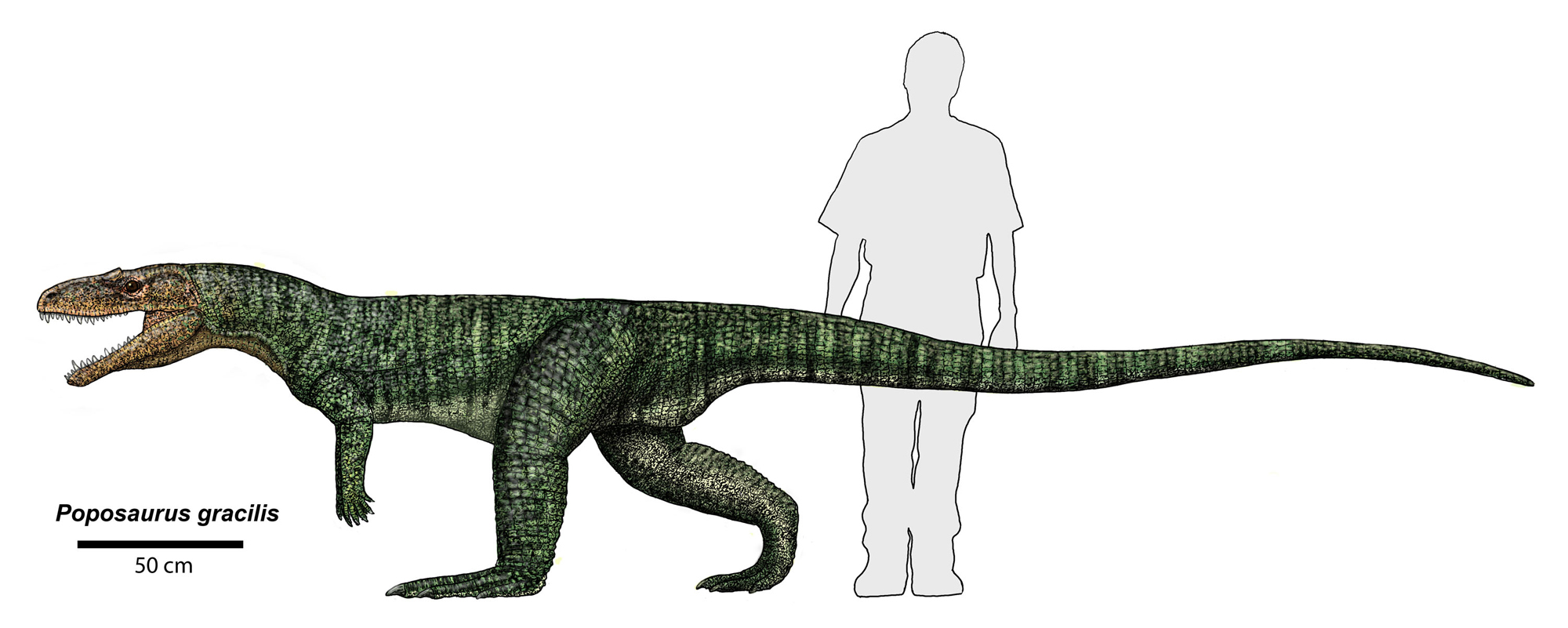
- Restoration of the Late Triassic crocodile relative Poposaurus with an anachronistic human to scale
  †Poposaurus
  - †Poposaurus gracilis
- Poromya
  - †Poromya lohaliensis – type locality for species
- †Postosuchus
  - †Postosuchus kirkpatricki
- †Pravusuchus
  - †Pravusuchus hortus
- †Prionocyclus
  - †Prionocyclus hyatti
  - †Prionocyclus percarinatus
- †Procolophonichnium
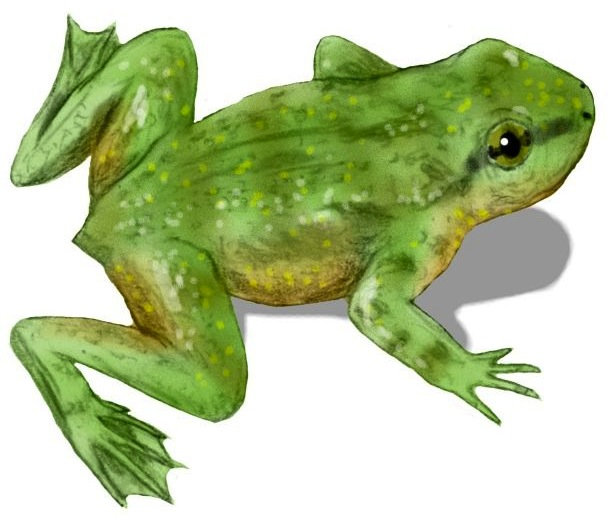
- Life restoration of the Early Jurassic frog Prosalirus
  †Prosalirus – type locality for genus
  - †Prosalirus bitis – type locality for species
- †Protelliptio – tentative report
- †Protome – type locality for genus
  - †Protome batalaria – type locality for species
- †Protosuchus – type locality for genus
  - †Protosuchus richardsoni – type locality for species
- †Pseudaspidoceras
  - †Pseudaspidoceras flexuosum
  - †Pseudaspidoceras pseudonodosoides
- †Pseudocalycoceras
  - †Pseudocalycoceras angolaense
- †Pseudoperna
  - †Pseudoperna bentonense
  - †Pseudoperna bentonensis
- †Pseudopetalodontia
  - †Pseudopetalodontia felixi
- †Pseudoptera
  - †Pseudoptera propleura
- †Psilomya
  - †Psilomya concentrica
  - †Psilomya elongata
  - †Psilomya meeki
- †Psilothyris
  - †Psilothyris occidentalis
- †Pteraichnus – type locality for genus
  - †Pteraichnus saltwashensis – type locality for species
- †Puebloites
  - †Puebloites greenhornensis
  - †Puebloites spiralis
- Pycnodonte
  - †Pycnodonte kansasense – tentative report
  - †Pycnodonte kellumi – or unidentified related form
  - †Pycnodonte newberryi
- †Pyktes
  - †Pyktes fusiformis
- †Pyncnodonte
  - †Pyncnodonte kellumi – or unidentified related form
  - †Pyncnodonte newberryi
- †Pyrgulifera
  - †Pyrgulifera ornata
- †Pyropsis
  - †Pyropsis coloradoensis – or unidentified comparable form
  - †Pyropsis kochi – type locality for species

== Q ==
- †Quasicyclotosaurus – type locality for genus
  - †Quasicyclotosaurus campi – type locality for species
- †Quitmaniceras
  - †Quitmaniceras reaseri – or unidentified comparable form

== R ==
- †Radiolites
- Ramphonotus – or unidentified comparable form
- †Rectithyris
  - †Rectithyris vespertina – type locality for species
- †Reticulodus – type locality for genus
  - †Reticulodus synergus – type locality for species
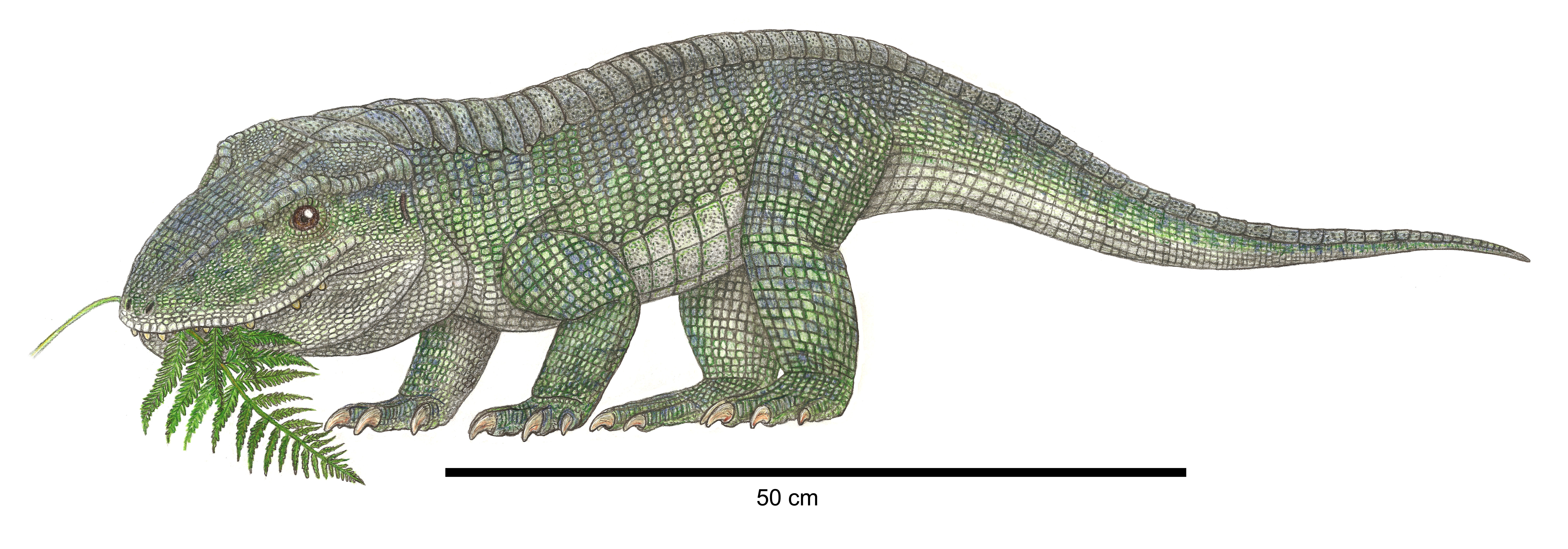
- Life restoration of the Late Triassic crocodile relative Revueltosaurus
  †Revueltosaurus
  - †Revueltosaurus callenderi
  - †Revueltosaurus hunti
- †Rhadalognathus – type locality for genus
  - †Rhadalognathus boweni – type locality for species
- †Rhamphinion – type locality for genus
  - †Rhamphinion jenkinsi – type locality for species
- †Rhombopsis – tentative report
  - †Rhombopsis huerfanensis
- †Rhynchosauroides
  - †Rhynchosauroides schochardti
- †Rhynchostreon
  - †Rhynchostreon levis
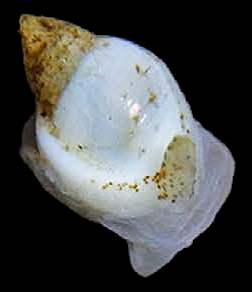
- A living Ringicula sea snail
  Ringicula
  - †Ringicula codellana
- †Rioarribasuchus
  - †Rioarribasuchus chamaensis
- Rostellaria
  - †Rostellaria venenatus – tentative report
- †Rotodactylus – type locality for genus
  - †Rotodactylus bradyi – type locality for species
  - †Rotodactylus cursorius – type locality for species
- †Rubroceras
  - †Rubroceras rotundum
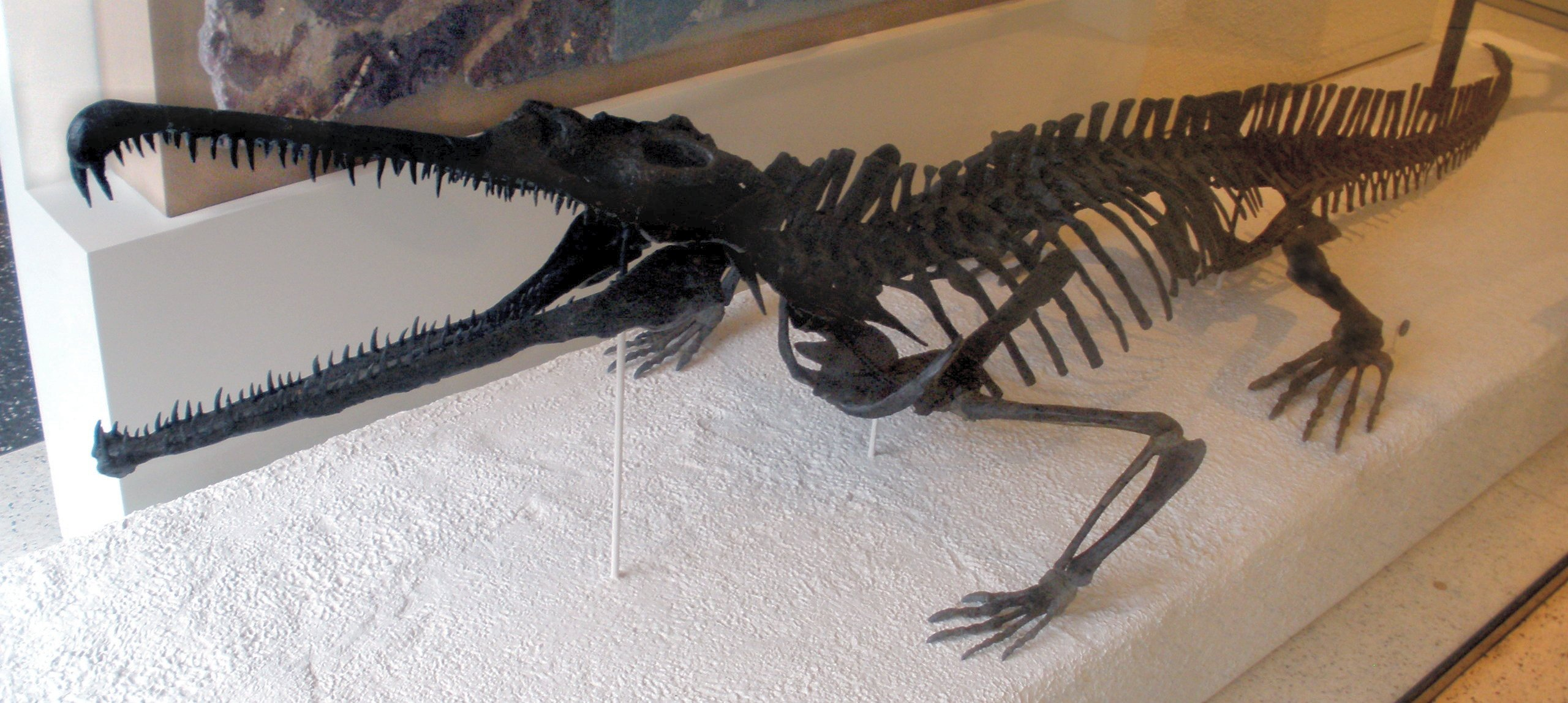
- Fossilized skeleton of the Late Triassic phytosaur Rutiodon
  †Rutiodon

== S ==
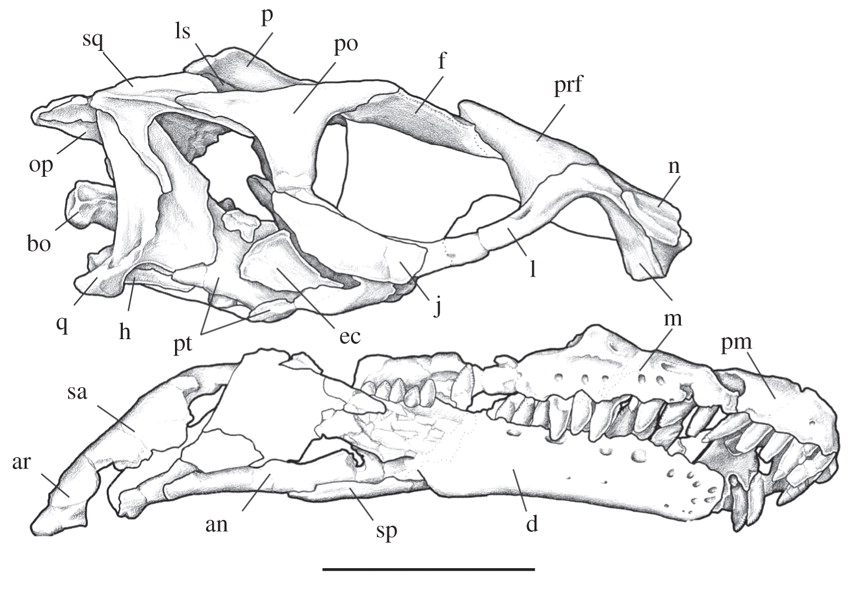
- Illustration in multiple views of the fossilized skull of the Early Jurassic sauropodomorph dinosaur Sarahsaurus
  †Sarahsaurus – type locality for genus
  - †Sarahsaurus aurifontanalis – type locality for species
- Scalpellum – tentative report
- †Scaphites
  - †Scaphites larvaeformis
- †Sciponoceras
  - †Sciponoceras gracile
- †Scutarx – type locality for genus
  - †Scutarx deltatylus – type locality for species
- †Scutellosaurus – type locality for genus
  - †Scutellosaurus lawleri – type locality for species
- †Segisaurus – type locality for genus
  - †Segisaurus halli – type locality for species
- †Selaginella
  - †Selaginella anasazia – type locality for species
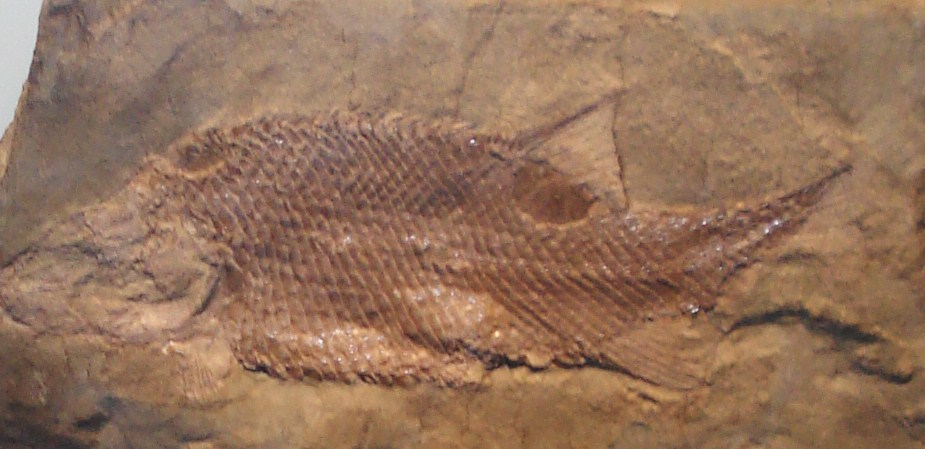
- Fossilized skeleton of the Late Triassic-Early Jurassic bony fish Semionotus
  †Semionotus – or unidentified comparable form
- †Senis
  - †Senis elongatus
- †Sergipia
  - †Sergipia hartti – tentative report
- Serpula
  - †Serpula implicata
  - †Serpula intrica
  - †Serpula large
- †Shuvosaurus
  - †Shuvosaurus inexpectatus
- †Sinzowiella
  - †Sinzowiella spathi
- †Smilosuchus – type locality for genus
  - †Smilosuchus adamanensis – type locality for species
  - †Smilosuchus gregorii – type locality for species
  - †Smilosuchus lithodendrorum – type locality for species
- Solemya
  - †Solemya obscura
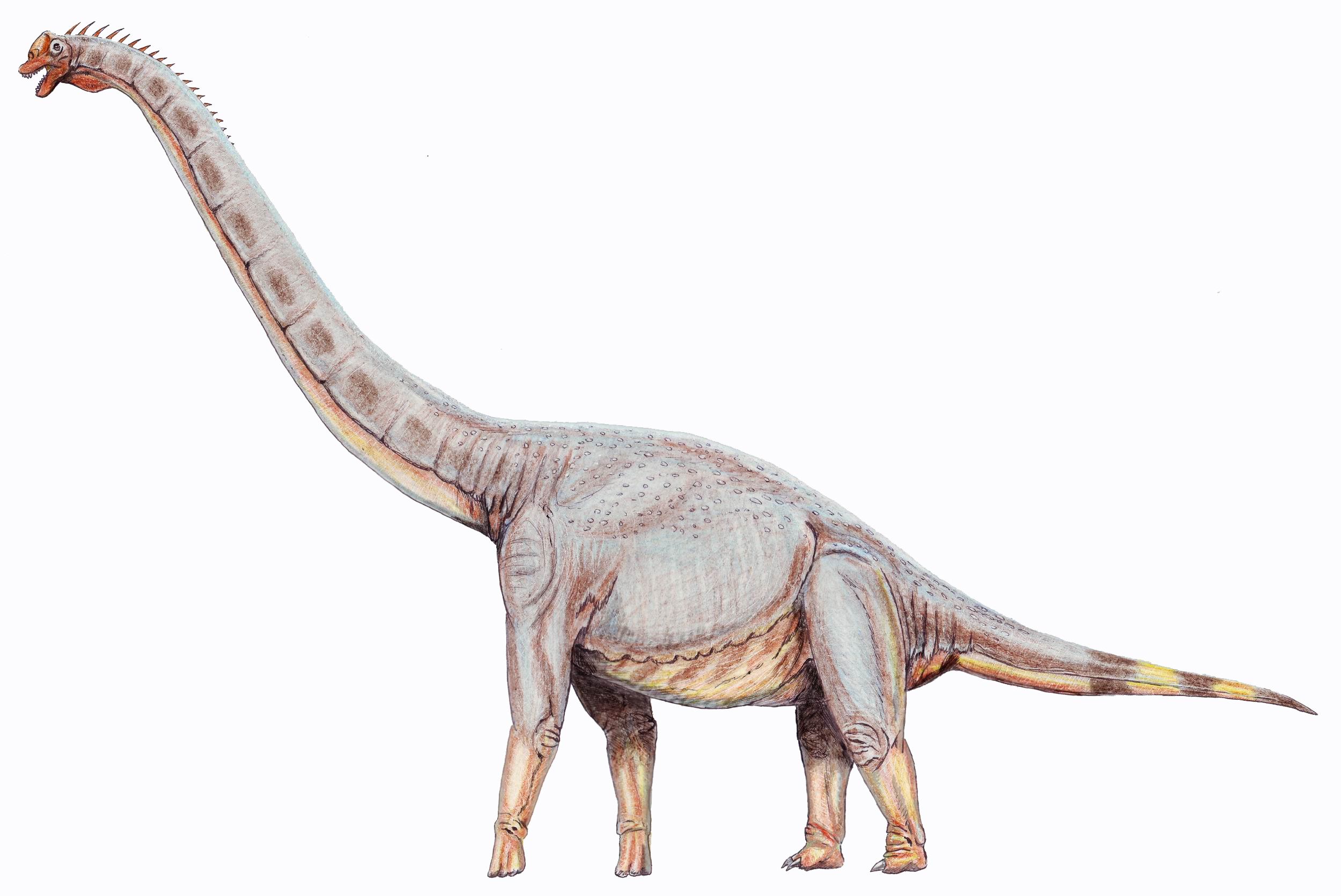
- Life restoration of the Early-Late Cretaceous brachiosaur Sonorasaurus
  †Sonorasaurus – type locality for genus
  - †Sonorasaurus thompsoni – type locality for species
- †Spathites
  - †Spathites puercoensis
- Spirorbis
- Squilla – tentative report
- †Stagonolepis
- †Stanocephalosaurus – type locality for genus
  - †Stanocephalosaurus birdi – type locality for species
  - †Stanocephalosaurus new species – informal
- †Stoliczkaia
  - †Stoliczkaia scotti
- †Stomohamites
- †Stylocyathus
- †Sumitomoceras
  - †Sumitomoceras conlini
- †Synaptichnium
  - †Synaptichnium cameronensis – type locality for species
  - †Synaptichnium diabloensis – type locality for species
- †Syncyclonema
  - †Syncyclonema spp.
- †Syntarsus

== T ==
- †Tanytrachelos
- †Tecovasaurus
  - †Tecovasaurus murryi
- †Tecovasuchus
  - †Tecovasuchus chatterjeei
- †Tectaplica – tentative report
  - †Tectaplica utahensis
- Tellina
  - †Tellina carlilana – type locality for species
- †Tenea
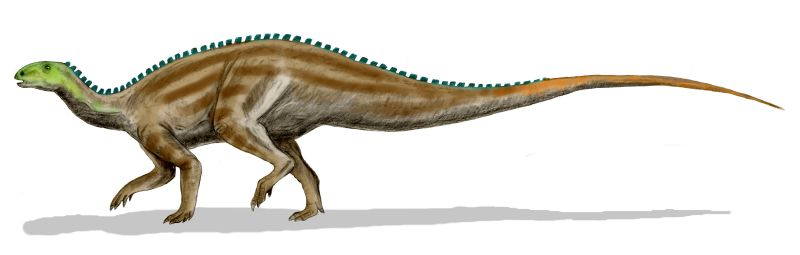
- Life restoration of the Early Cretaceous Iguanodon relative Tenontosaurus
  †Tenontosaurus
- †Terebrimya
- Teredolithus
- †Therapsipus – type locality for genus
  - †Therapsipus cumminsi – type locality for species
- †Thomasites
  - †Thomasites gongilensis – or unidentified comparable form
- †Toucasia
  - †Toucasia hancockensis
- †Tragodesmoceras
  - †Tragodesmoceras bassi
  - †Tragodesmoceras socorroense
- †Triasamnicola – or unidentified comparable form
  - †Triasamnicola pilsbryi
- †Trigonia
  - †Trigonia aliformis - or unidentified loosely related form
  - †Trigonia cragini
  - †Trigonia guildi
  - †Trigonia kitchini
  - †Trigonia mearnsi
  - †Trigonia reesidei
  - †Trigonia resoluta
  - †Trigonia saavedra
  - †Trigonia stolleyi
  - †Trigonia weaveri
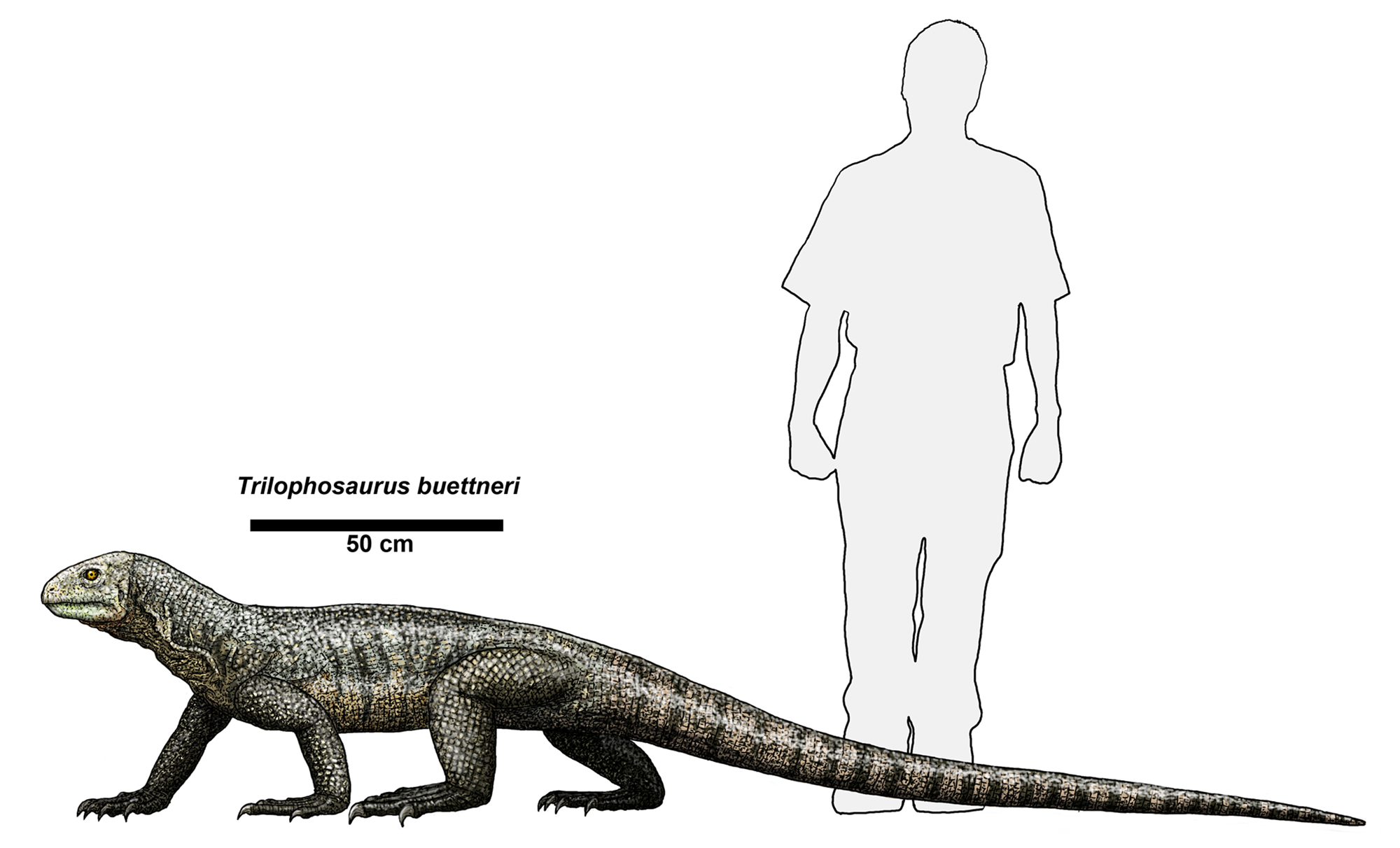
- Restoration of the Late Triassic reptile Trilophosaurus with an anachronistic human to scale
  †Trilophosaurus
  - †Trilophosaurus buettneri
  - †Trilophosaurus jacobsi – type locality for species
- †Triodus
  - †Triodus moorei
- Trochocyathus
- Turritella
  - †Turritella A – informal
  - †Turritella B – informal
  - †Turritella cobbani – type locality for species
  - †Turritella codellana – type locality for species
  - †Turritella kauffmani – type locality for species
  - †Turritella whitei
- †Turseodus
  - †Turseodus dolorensis – or unidentified comparable form
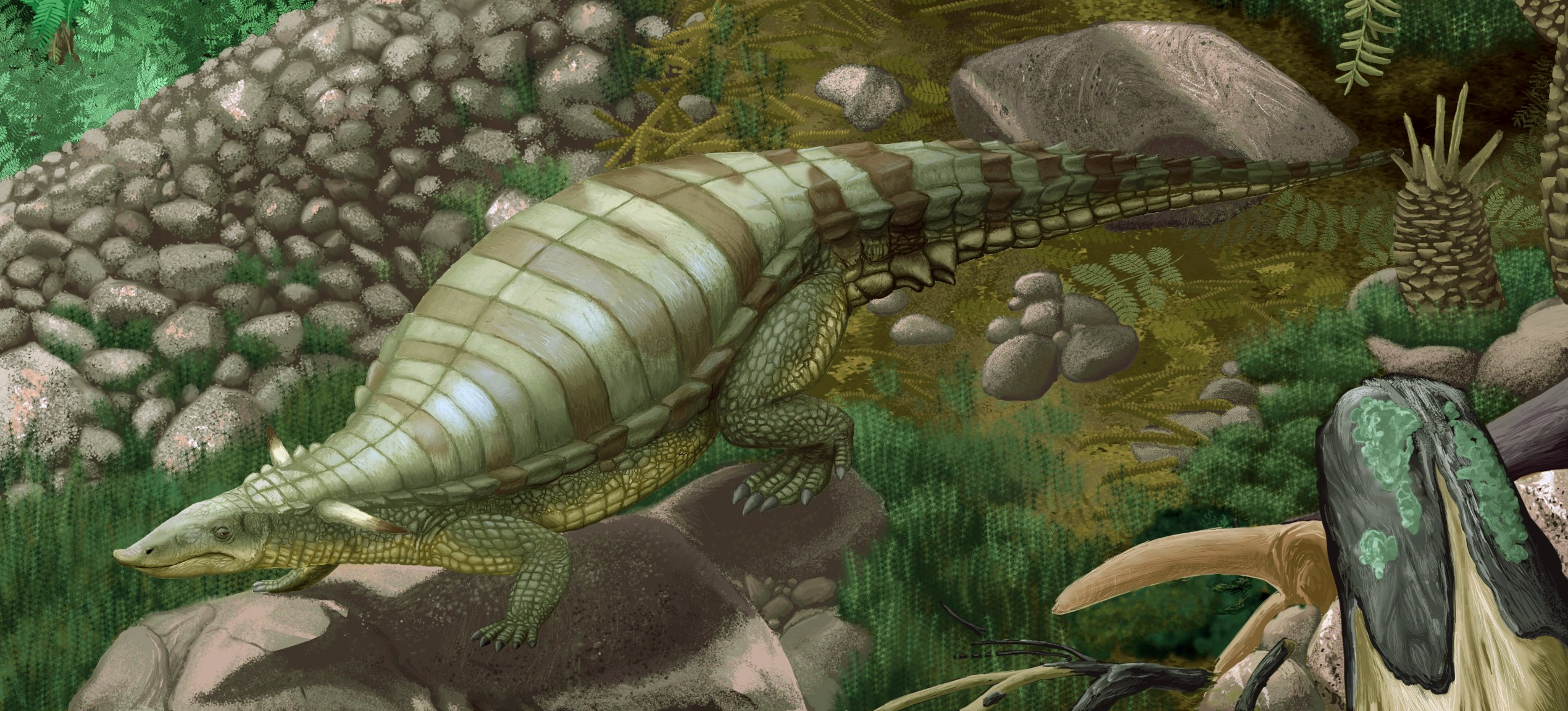
- Restoration of a pair of the Late Triassic aetosaur Typothorax
  †Typothorax
  - †Typothorax coccinarum

== U ==
- †Uatchitodon
  - †Uatchitodon schneideri
- †Unicardium
- Unio

== V ==
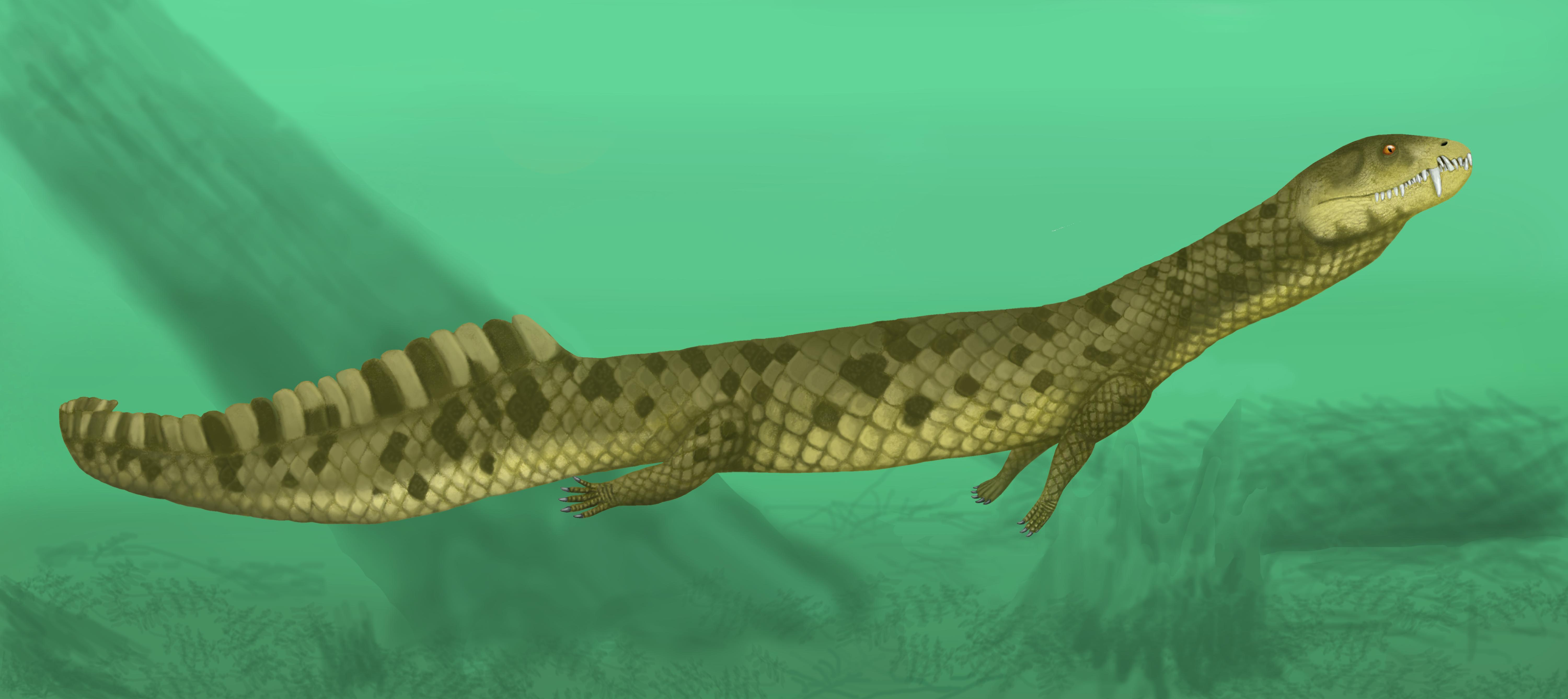
- Life restoration of the Late Triassic reptile Vancleavea
  †Vancleavea – type locality for genus
  - †Vancleavea campi – type locality for species
- †Vascoceras
  - †Vascoceras diartianum
- †Veniella
  - †Veniella goniophora
  - †Veniella mortoni
- †Vigilius
  - †Vigilius wellesi
- Viviparus
- †Voysa
  - †Voysa varia
- Vulsella

== W ==
- †Watinoceras
  - †Watinoceras coloradoense
  - †Watinoceras devonense
  - †Watinoceras hattini
  - †Watinoceras praecursor – or unidentified comparable form
  - †Watinoceras spp.
- †Weeksia
- †Wellesaurus
  - †Wellesaurus peabodyi – type locality for species
- †Worthoceras
  - †Worthoceras gibbosum
  - †Worthoceras vermiculum

== Y ==
- †Yezoites
  - †Yezoites delicatulus
