= Acanthohoplitinae =

Scientific classification
- Kingdom: Animalia
- Phylum: Mollusca
- Class: Cephalopoda
- Subclass: †Ammonoidea
- Order: †Ammonitida
- Suborder: †Ancyloceratina
- Family: †Parahoplitidae
- Subfamily: †Acanthohoplitinae; Stoyanow, 1949

Genera
- Acanthohoplites; Colombiceras; Immunitoceras; Paracanthohoplites

Acanthohoplitinae is an extinct subfamily of cephalopods belonging to the ammonite family Parahoplitidae.
