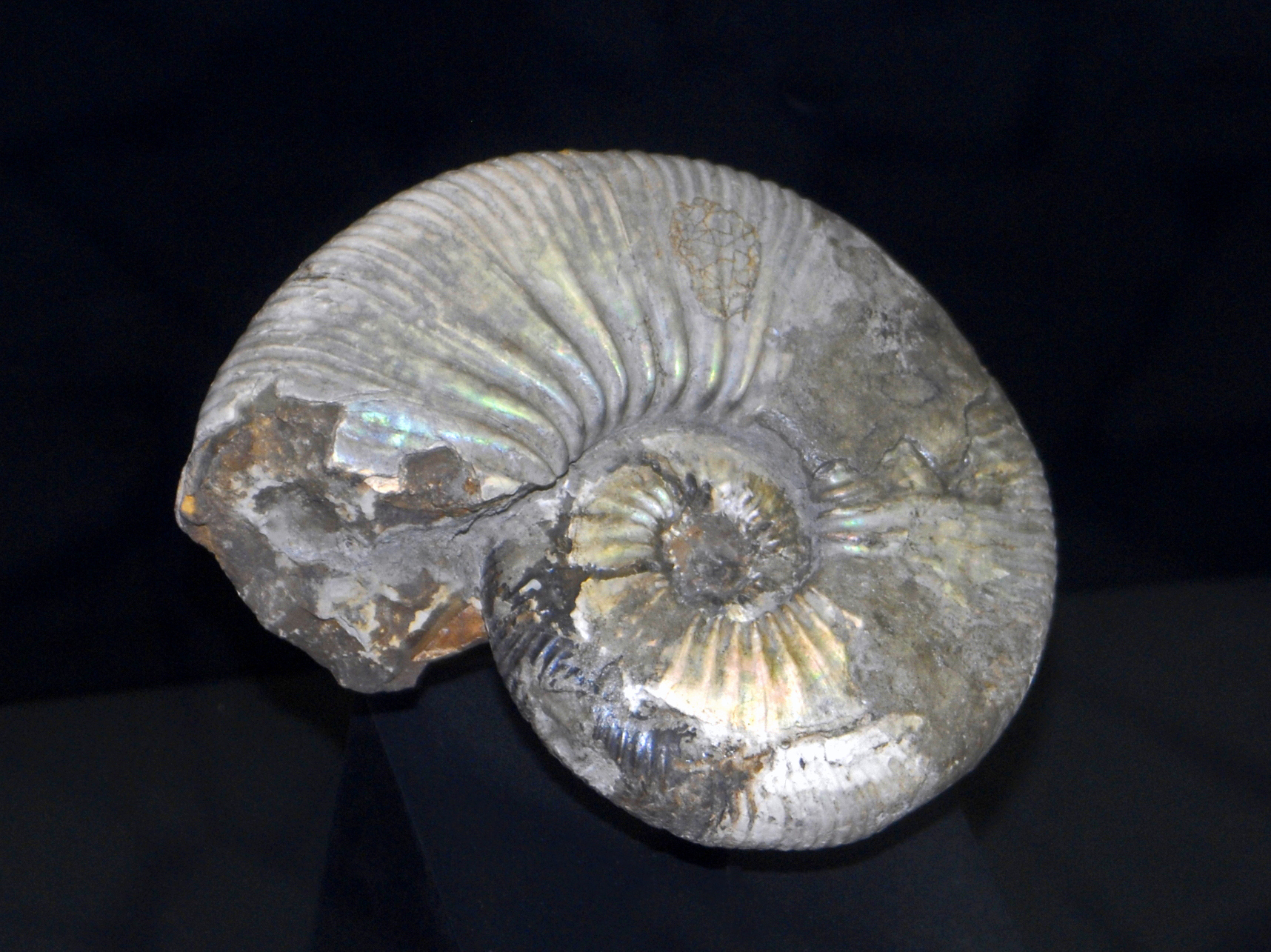
- A. hannoverensis Hannover (Germany)

Scientific classification
- Kingdom: Animalia
- Phylum: Mollusca
- Class: Cephalopoda
- Subclass: †Ammonoidea
- Order: †Ammonitida
- Suborder: †Ancyloceratina
- Family: †Parahoplitidae
- Subfamily: †Acanthohoplitinae
- Genus: †Acanthohoplites; Sinzow, 1908

Species
- See text

Synonyms
- Acanthoplites; Protacanthoplites Tovbina 1970

= Acanthohoplites =

Acanthohoplites Temporal range: Aptian-Early Albian ~122.46–109.0 Ma

Extinct genus of Cretaceous ammonites

Acanthohoplites is an extinct genus of ammonites in the family Parahoplitidae that lived in the Aptian and Early Albian stages of the Early Cretaceous.

== Taxonomy ==
The taxonomic position in the Treatise on Invertebrate Paleontology Pt L, 1957 placed the genus into the family Deshayesitidae. Newer classifications have revised that placement and the genus is now included into the family Parahoplitidae. Parahoplites and Hypacanthoplites are similar genera.

== Description ==
These ammonites have a strongly ribbed shell and ammonitic suture. Early whorls are coronate, which later become round, then oval in section. Primary ribs may have swellings (bullae) at the umbilicus or are without. In early stages primary ribs branch mid flank at prominent lateral tubercles. In later stages lateral tubercles are reduced or absent and primary ribs branch simply at the umbilical shoulder or, again, mid flank. Sutural elements are subquadrate with narrow, shallow embayments. The first lateral lobe tends to be symmetrical.

== Species ==
The following species have been described, either as Acanthoplites or Acanthohoplites.

- A. abichi
- A. aschiltaensis
- A. belohasifakaensis
- A. berkleyi
- A. bigoureti
- A. erraticus
- A. hannoverensis
- A. hesper
- A. impetrabilis
- A. interiectus
- A. manerensis
- A. midoensis
- A. mitiensis
- A. paucicostatus
- A. schucherti
- A. soaranensis
- A. teres
- A. trifurcatus
- A. venustus

The species A. nolani was described as Hoplites nolani and later designated the type species of the genus Nolaniceras in 1961, and was subsequently renamed as Nolaniceras nolani.

== Distribution ==
Acanthohoplites has been found in Upper Aptian and Lower Albian sediments in Europe, Central Asia, East Africa, North and South America:

- Río Mayer Formation, Argentina
- Lowell Formation, Arizona
- Paja Formation, Barichara, Colombia
- Grès verts helvétiques Formation, France
- Georgia
- Ochtrup, Germany
- Sardinia, Italy
- Madagascar
- Clansayes and La Peña Formations, Mexico
- Lemgo Formation, Morocco
- Maputo Formation, Mozambique
- Hokodz River Basin, Russia
- Makatini Formation, South Africa
- Lower Greensand Formation, United Kingdom
- Morocoto River, Venezuela
