= Dinnebitodon =

Dinnebitodon Temporal range: Early Jurassic, 189 Ma

Scientific classification
- Kingdom: Animalia
- Phylum: Chordata
- Clade: Synapsida
- Clade: Therapsida
- Clade: Cynodontia
- Family: †Tritylodontidae
- Genus: †Dinnebitodon; Sues, 1986

Species
- D. amarali (Sues, 1986) (type)

Extinct genus of mammaliamorphs

Dinnebitodon is an extinct genus of tritylodontid mammaliamorphs from the Early Jurassic. It has only been found in the Kayenta Formation in northeastern Arizona. It closely resembles the related genus Kayentatherium from the same formation. It is set apart by differences in the dentition, while resembling in most other respects.

== Description ==
Dinnebitodon (meaning "Dinnebito (Wash) tooth"), was a small quadrupedal animal, with a head 8 centimetres (3.1 in) in length, belonging to the herbivorous Tritylodontidae family. The description of Dinnebitodon does not give details on the structure of the body other than to say it was similar to Kayentatherium.

=== Skull and jaw ===
The majority of the remains so far recovered and assigned to the genus Dinnebitodon are skull and jaw material. These show that Dinnebitodon had a skull 8 centimetres (3.1 in) long and unique in form. There are three incisors on each side of the upper jaw, with the second incisor being large and well developed at 9 millimetres (0.35 in) by 7 millimetres (0.28 in). There are five postcanine teeth in the upper jaw that would have been functional when Dinnebitodon was alive, with a sixth possibly erupting later in the animal's life. The postcanine teeth resemble rounded-off squares with three rows of cusps on their occlusal surfaces. The teeth are notably different from the other two named Kayenta tritylodonts, Kayentatherium and Oligokyphus.

== Habitat ==
The Kayenta Formation was deposited in an environment of braided rivers and dune fields, similar to northern Senegal today. Dinnebitodon was a terrestrial animal, living in the "Silty Facies" of the Kayenta Formation, which would have represented an interdunal river deposit. The teeth resemble those of modern animals that feed on seeds and nuts, suggesting that perhaps Dinnebitodon fed on similar foods present during the early Jurassic Period. Considering it was living alongside its close relative Kayentatherium, some niche partitioning of the resources would have been necessary in order to avoid being outcompeted for a food source. This might explain why two similar looking animals have different dentition.

== Fossil finds ==
Dinnebitodon fossils were first discovered by William Amaral (for whom the species is named) in 1978. Remains are housed at Harvard's Museum of Comparative Zoology and at the Museum of Northern Arizona.

== Palaeoecology ==
Dental microwear of D. amarali suggests that it fed on moderately tough foods such as insects and soft seeds.
