= List of the prehistoric life of Minnesota =

This list of the prehistoric life of Minnesota contains the various prehistoric life-forms whose fossilized remains have been reported from within the US state of Minnesota.

== Precambrian ==
The Paleobiology Database records no known occurrences of Precambrian fossils in Minnesota.

== Paleozoic ==
=== Selected Paleozoic taxa of Minnesota ===
- †Actinoceras
- †Actinodiscus
- †Amorphognathus
- †Armenoceras
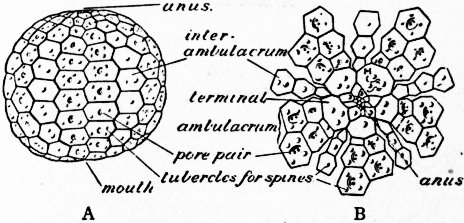
- Reconstructive diagram (left) of a fossil (right) of the Ordovician sea urchin Bothriocidaris. The short spines which were attached to the tubercles are not drawn.
  †Bothriocidaris
- †Bumastus
  - †Bumastus orbicaudatus
- †Calymene
- †Cameroceras
- †Ceratopsis
- †Ceraurinella
- †Ceraurinus
- †Ceraurus
- †Charactoceras
- †Chasmatopora
- †Chidleyenoceras
- †Chirognathus
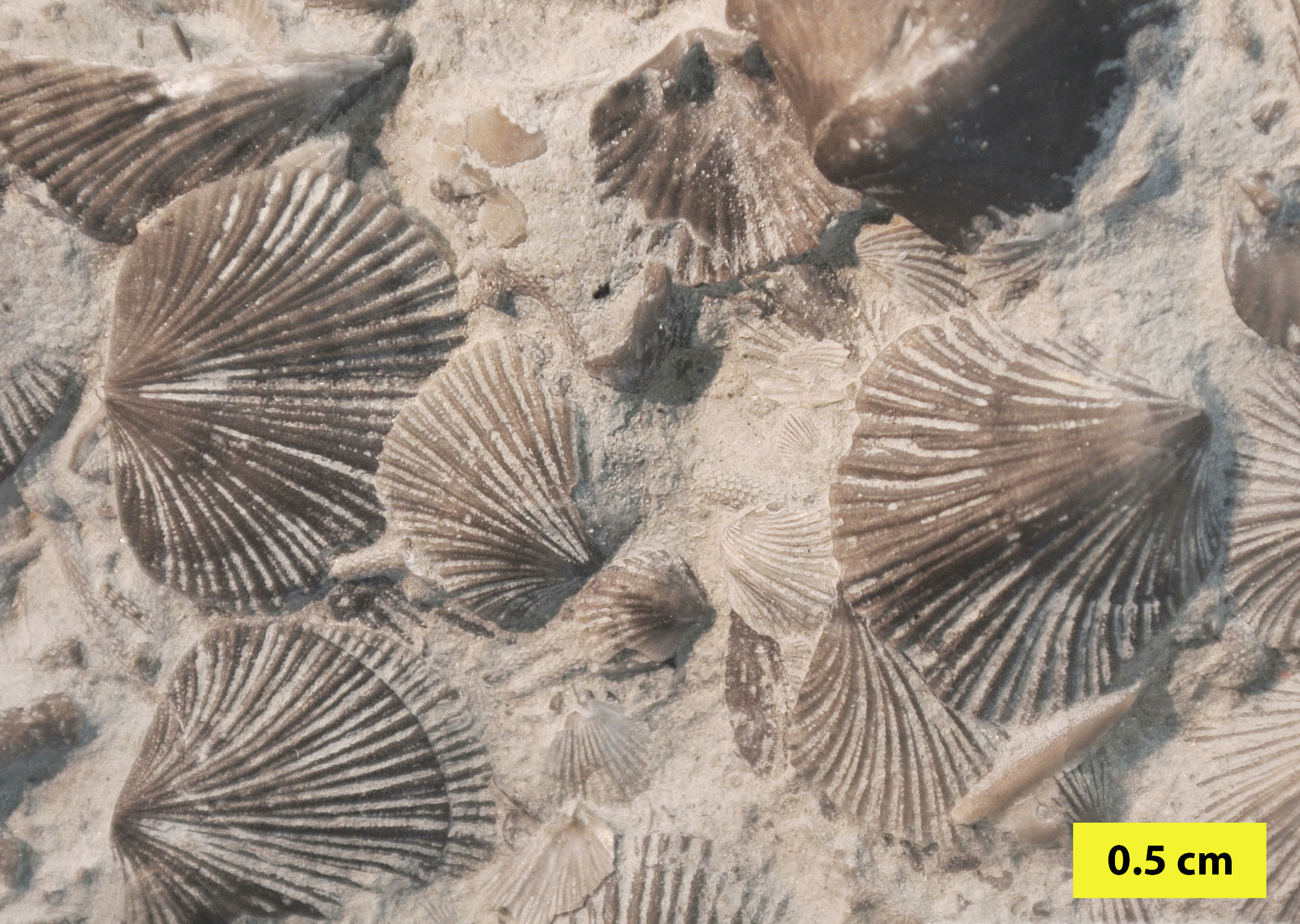
- Assemblage of fossilized shells of the Ordovician brachiopod Cincinnetina
  †Cincinnetina
  - †Cincinnetina minnesotensis – type locality for species
- †Constellaria
- †Cordylodus
- †Cotteroceras
- †Crania
- †Craniops
- †Culumbodina
- †Curtognathus
- †Cyclonema
- †Cyptendoceras
- †Cyrtolites
- †Diplograptus
- †Ellesmeroceras
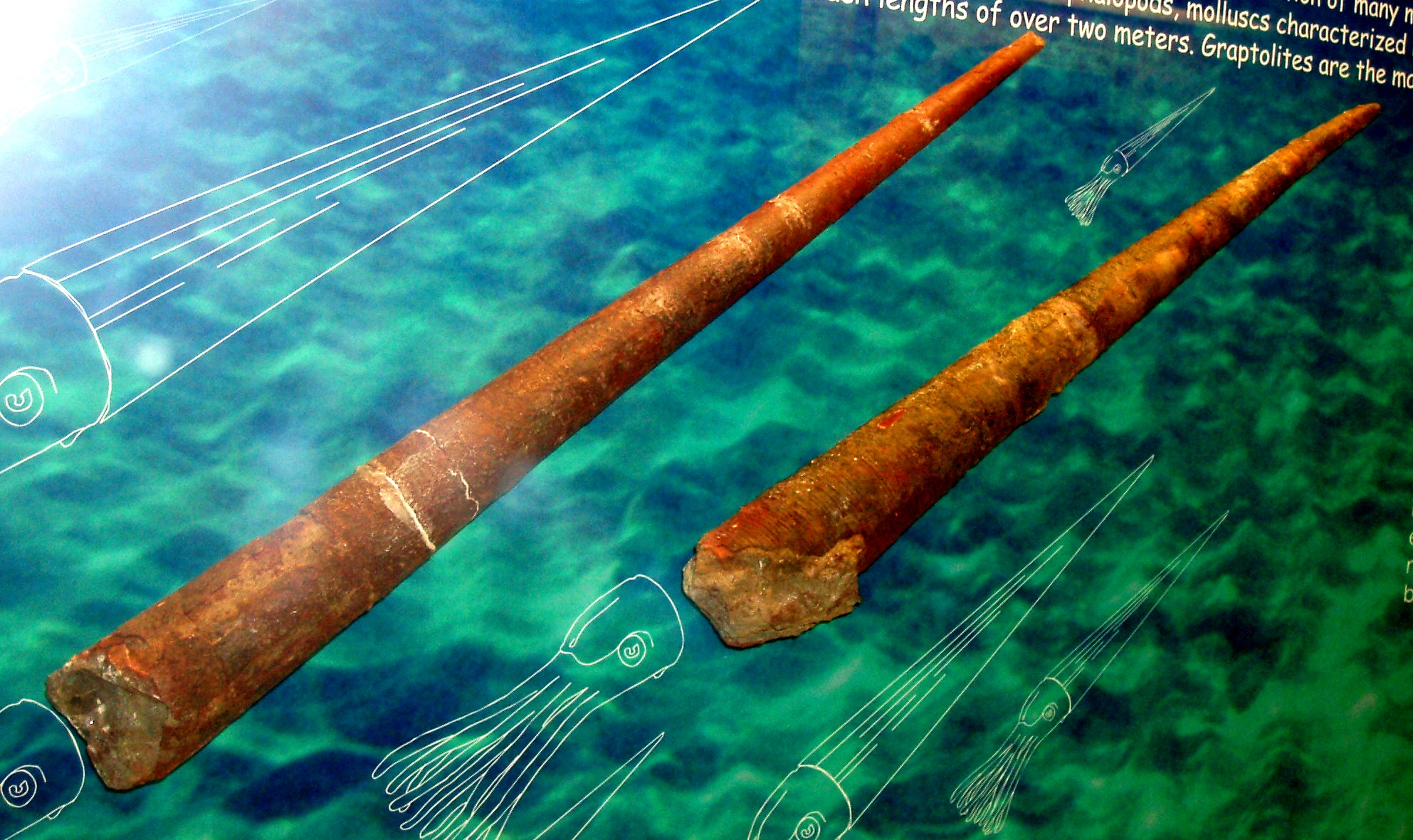
- Fossilized shells and restored appearances of the Middle-Late Ordovician nautiloid cephalopod Endoceras
  †Endoceras
- †Erratencrinurus
- †Fayettoceras – tentative report
- †Flexicalymene
  - †Flexicalymene senaria
- †Gabriceraurus
- †Geisonoceras
- †Glyptocrinus
- †Gonioceras
- †Grewingkia
- †Hallopora
- †Helcionopsis
- †Hindia
- †Holopea
- †Hypseloconus – type locality for genus
- †Icriodus
- †Illaenus
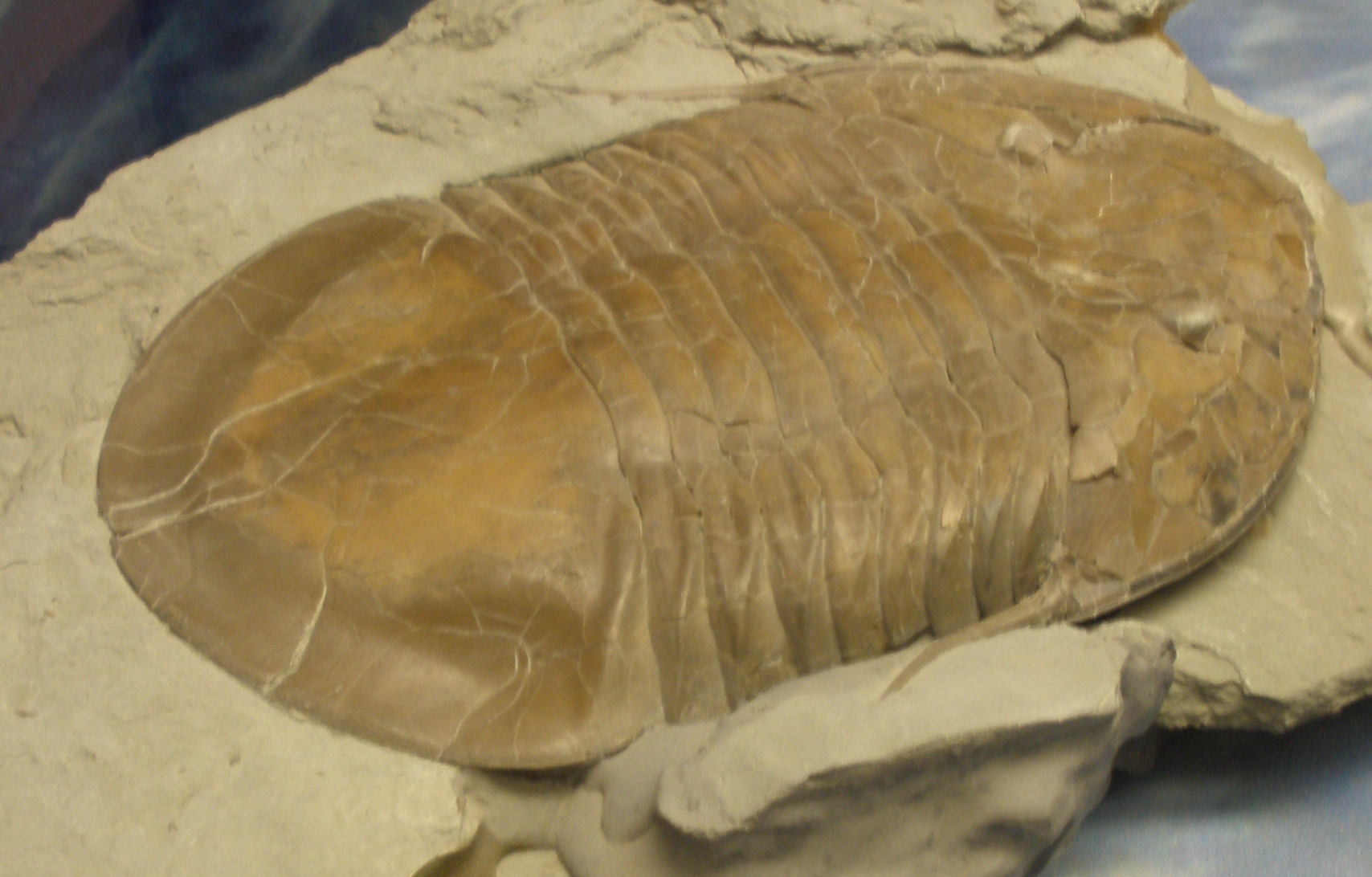
- Fossil of the Middle-Late Ordovician giant trilobite Isotelus.
  †Isotelus
  - †Isotelus gigas
- †Kentlandoceras
- †Kionoceras
- †Kirengella
- †Krausella
- †Lambeoceras
- †Lingula
- †Manitoulinoceras
- †Michelinoceras
- †Nanno
- †Ormoceras – tentative report
- †Orthoceras
- †Oulodus
- †Ozarkodina
- †Periodon
- †Phragmolites
- †Plaesiomys
- †Platystrophia
- †Plectoceras
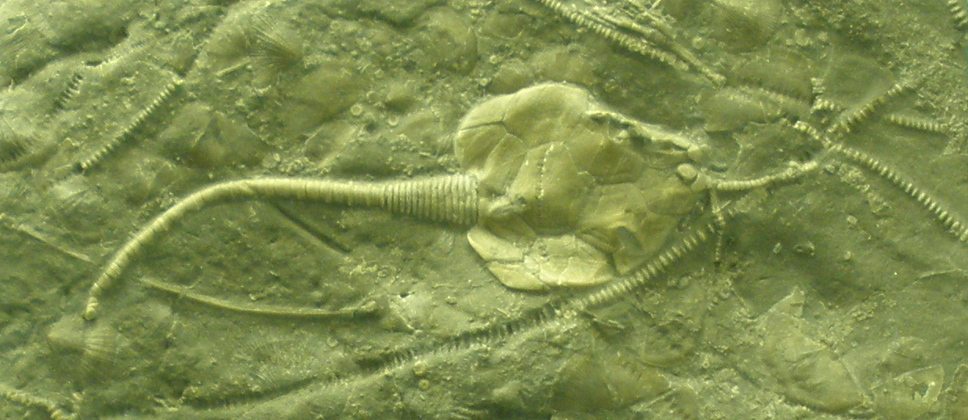
- Fossil of the Late Ordovician cystoid echinoderm Pleurocystites
  †Pleurocystites
- †Polygnathus
  - †Polygnathus linguiformis
  - †Polygnathus parawebbi
- †Polygrammoceras
- †Pterotheca
- †Reedsoceras
- †Reteocrinus
- †Rigidella
- †Rioceras
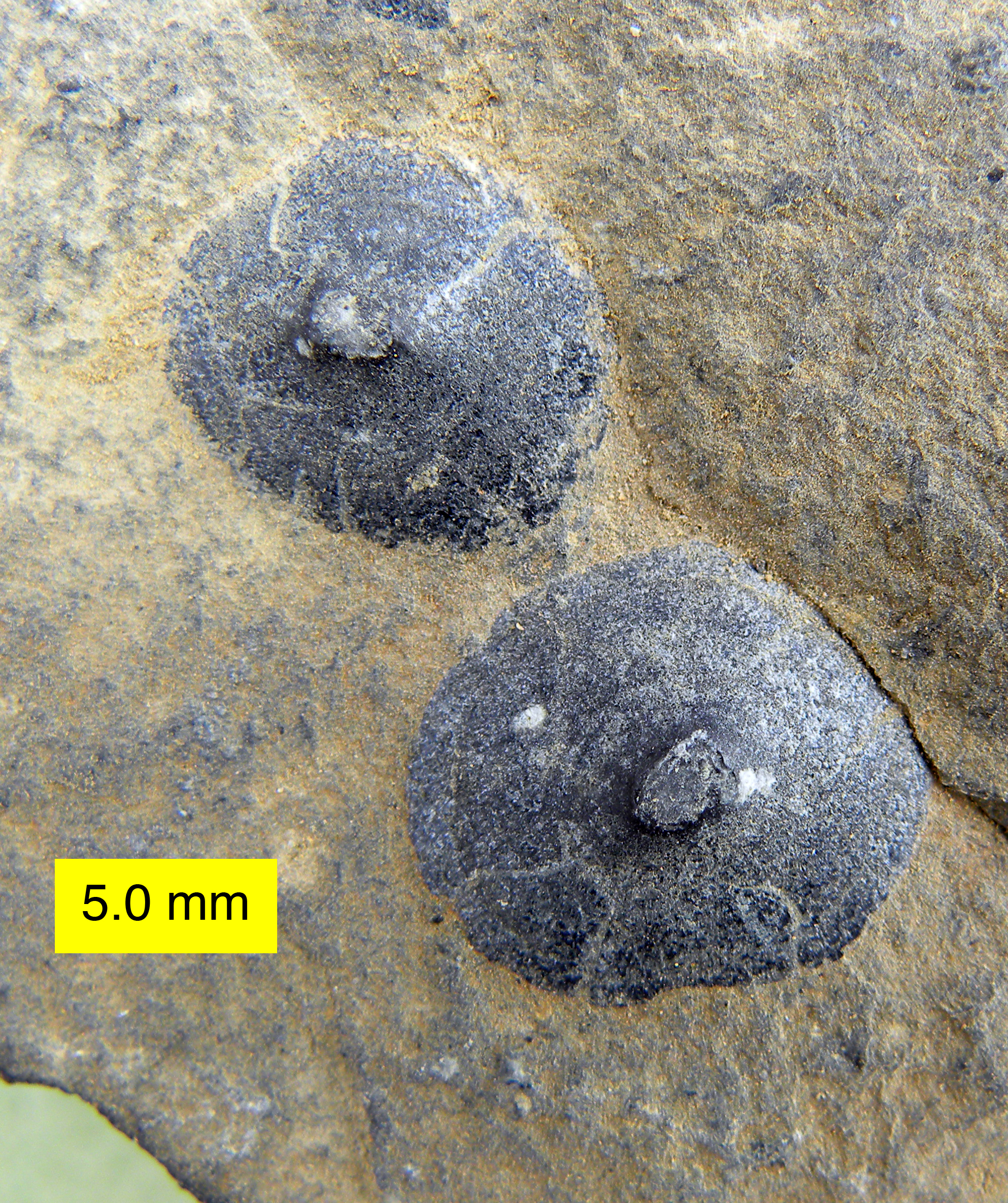
- Fossils of the Cambrian mollusc Scenella
  †Scenella
  - †Scenella compressa
  - †Scenella obtusa
- †Similodonta
- †Skenidioides
- †Sowerbyella
- †Spyroceras
- †Stigmatella
- †Strepsodiscus
- †Strophomena
  - †Strophomena billingsi
  - †Strophomena filitexta
  - †Strophomena incurvata
  - †Strophomena plattinensis – or unidentified comparable form
- †Subulites
- †Teichertoceras
- †Tryblidium
- †Ulrichoceras
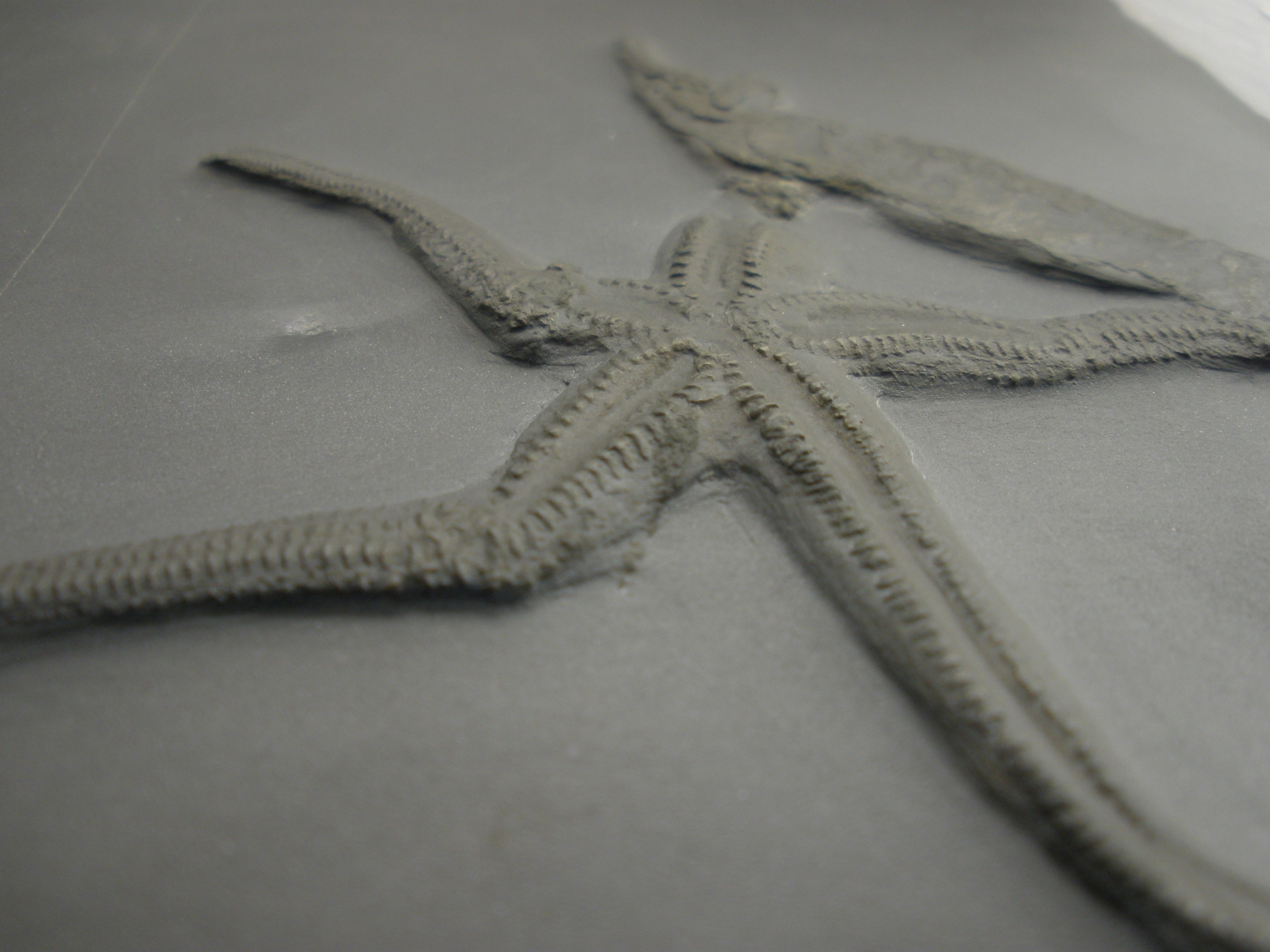
- Fossil of the Ordovician-Devonian sea star Urasterella
  †Urasterella
- †Valcouroceras
- †Vellamo
- †Westonoceras
- †Whiteavesia
- †Zittelloceras

== Mesozoic ==
- †Acanthoceras
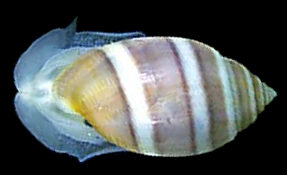
- A living Acteon barrel bubble sea snail
  †Acteon
  - †Acteon propinquus
- †Amphidonte – tentative report
- †Anatimya
  - †Anatimya plicata
- Anatina
  - †Anatina marblensis
- †Anchura
  - †Anchura grouti
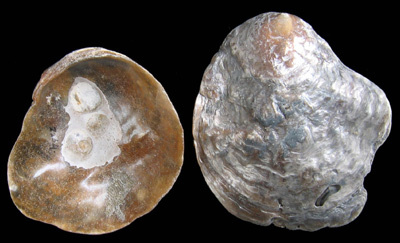
- Interior and exterior of a shell of an Anomia, or jingle shell
  †Anomia
  - †Anomia propatoris
- Aporrhais
  - †Aporrhais nuptialis
- †Arcellites
  - †Arcellites disciformis
- †Ariadnaesporites
  - †Ariadnaesporites varius
- Azolla – or unidentified comparable form
- Barbatia
  - †Barbatia micronema
- Brachidontes
  - †Brachidontes arcturusensis
- †Calliomphalus – tentative report
  - †Calliomphalus colerainensis
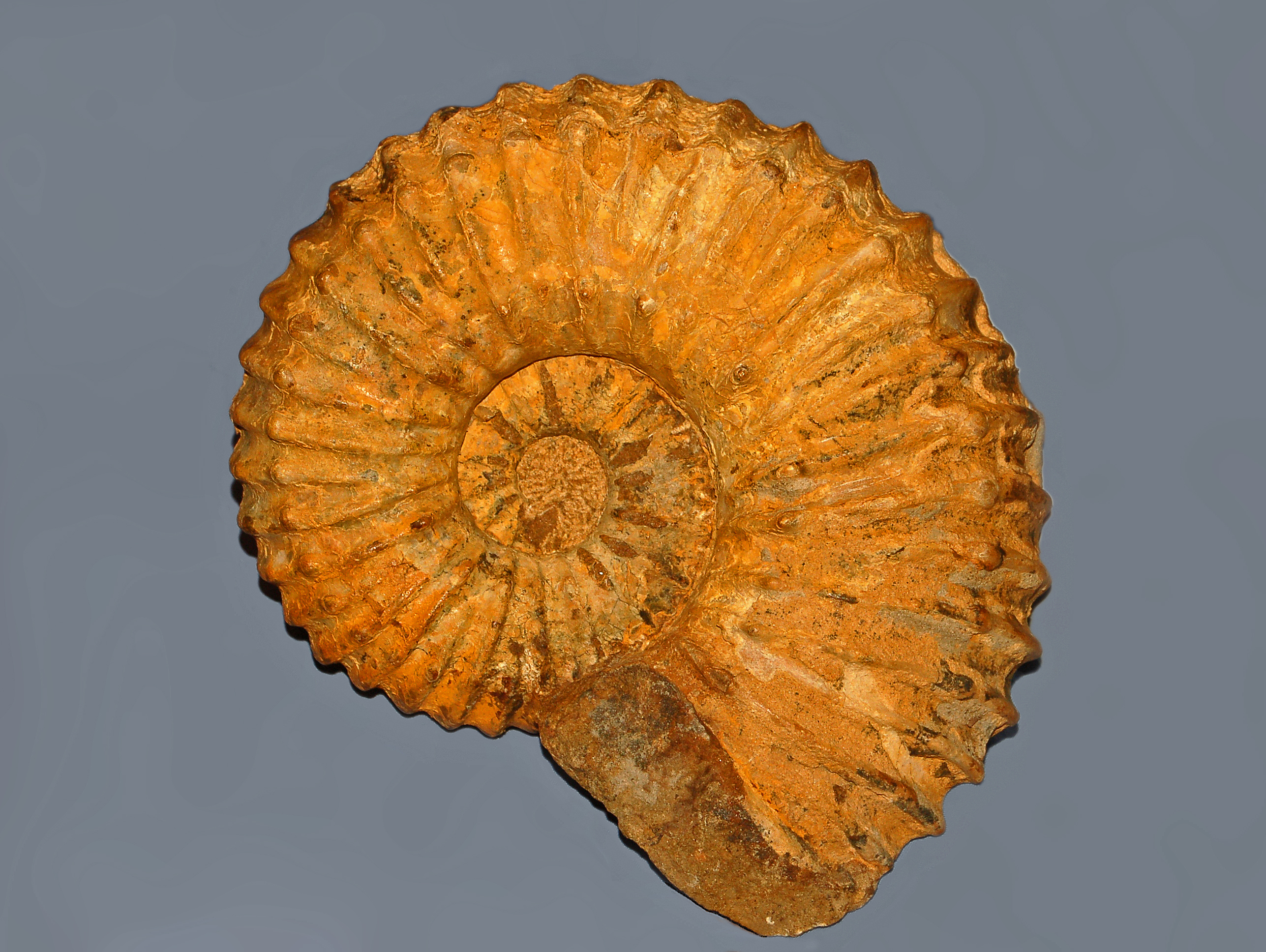
- Fossilized shell of the Late Cretaceous ammonoid cephalopod Calycoceras
  †Calycoceras – tentative report
- Carcharias
  - †Carcharias amonensis
- †Cenocarcharias
  - †Cenocarcharias tenuiplicatus
- †Collignoniceras
  - †Collignoniceras percarinatum
- Coptothyris
  - †Coptothyris dakotaensis
- Corbula
  - †Corbula kanabensis
- †Costatheca
- †Cretodus
  - †Cretodus semiplicatus
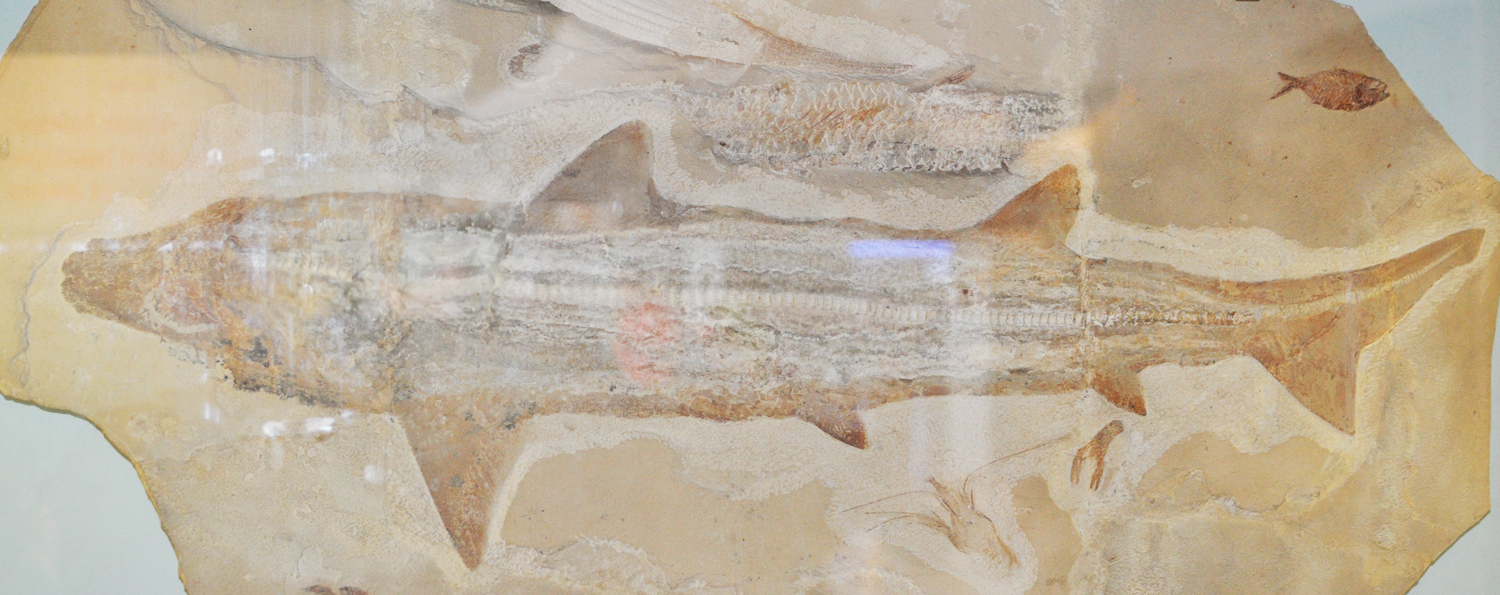
- Fossil of the Early Cretaceous-Eocene shark Cretolamna
  †Cretolamna
  - †Cretolamna appendiculata
- †Cymbophora
  - †Cymbophora emmonsi
  - †Cymbophora utahensis – tentative report
- †Dentalium
- Discradisca
- †Dunveganoceras
  - †Dunveganoceras hagei
- †Epitonium
- †Etea – tentative report
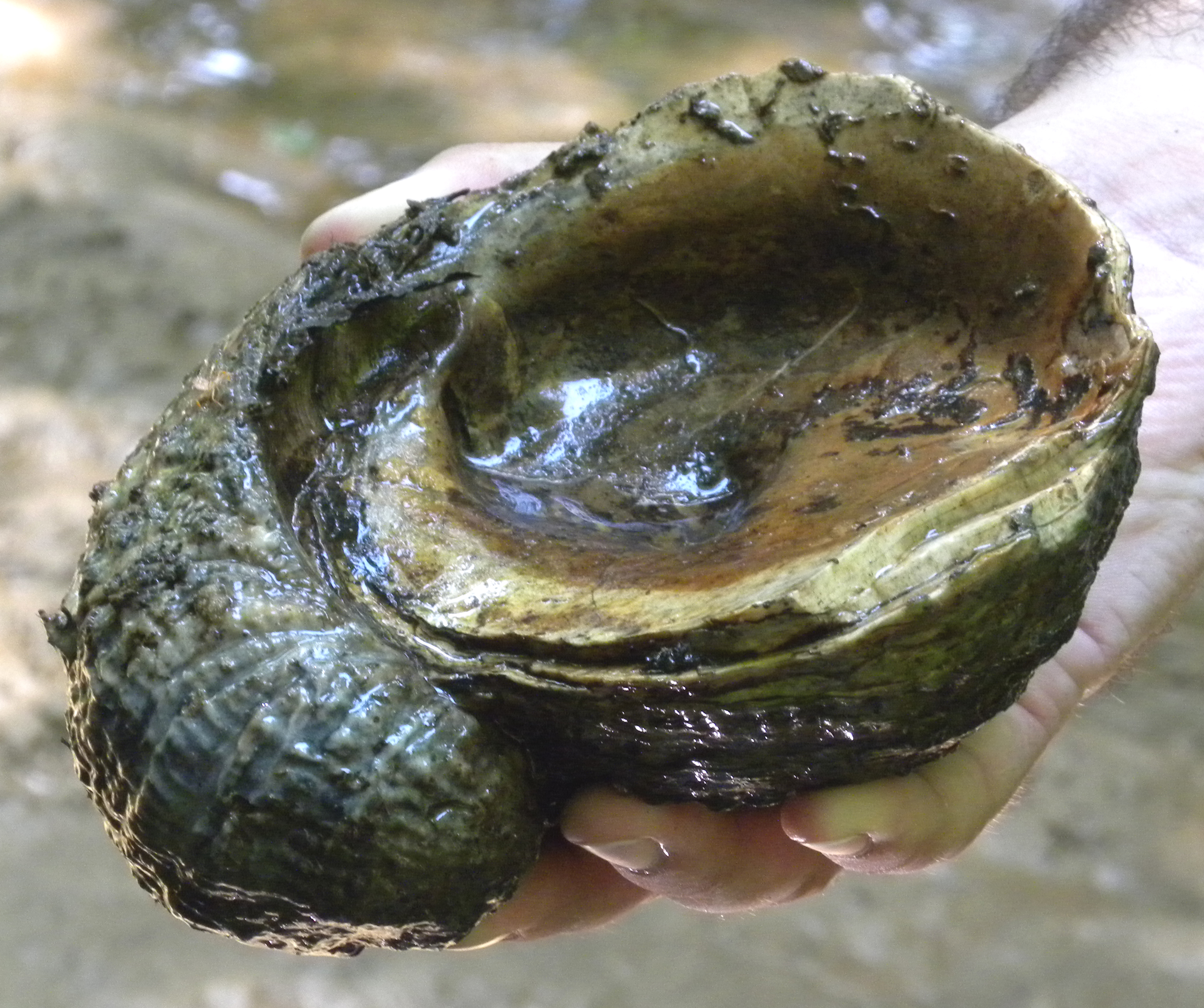
- Interior of a fossilized shell of the Jurassic-Cretaceous foam oyster Exogyra
  †Exogyra
  - †Exogyra boveyensis
  - †Exogyra lamellosa
  - †Exogyra mesabiensis
  - †Exogyra suborbiculata
- †Gervillia
  - †Gervillia propleura – tentative report
- †Goolandia
  - †Goolandia minnesotensis
- Granocardium
  - †Granocardium enstromi
- Gyrodes
  - †Gyrodes conradi
- †Hybodus
  - †Hybodus rajkovichi – type locality for species
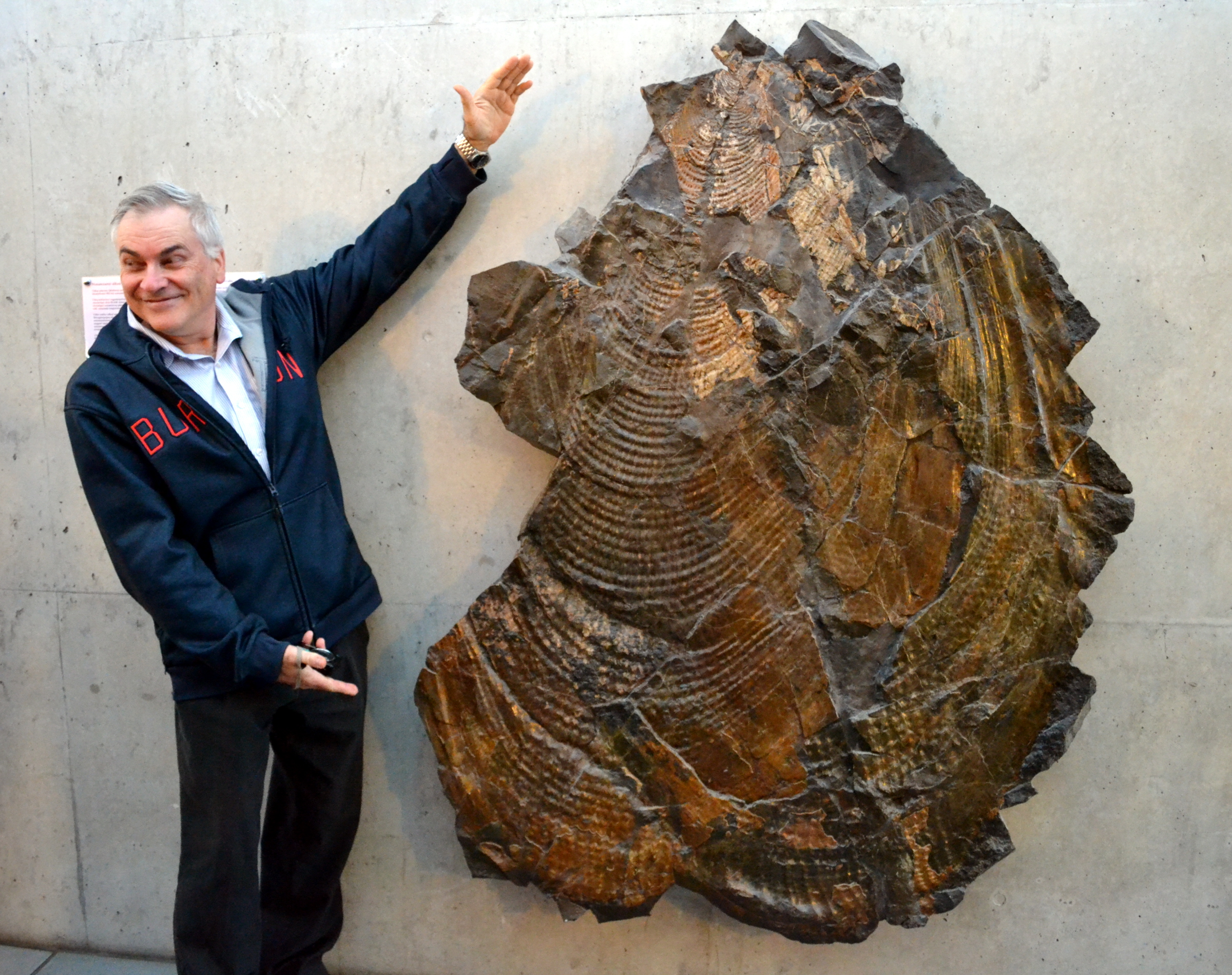
- Fossilized shell of the Early Jurassic-Late Cretaceous marine bivalve Inoceramus with a human indicating its size
  †Inoceramus
  - †Inoceramus apicalis
  - †Inoceramus fragilis
  - †Inoceramus mesabiensis
- †Ischyodus
- †Legumen
  - †Legumen planulatum – or unidentified comparable form
- †Leptosolen
  - †Leptosolen biplicatus
- Lima
  - †Lima utahensis
- †Lingula
  - †Lingula subspatulata – tentative report
- †Mesozoisynangia
  - †Mesozoisynangia trilobus
- †Metengonoceras
  - †Metengonoceras acutum
  - †Metengonoceras dumblei – or unidentified comparable form
  - †Metengonoceras dumbli
- †Metoicoceras
  - †Metoicoceras bergquisti
  - †Metoicoceras swallovi – or unidentified related form
- †Minerisporites
  - †Minerisporites mirabilis
- †Molaspora
  - †Molaspora rugosa
- †Mytiloides
  - †Mytiloides labiatus
  - †Mytiloides mytiloides
- Nerita – tentative report
  - †Nerita minnesotensis
- Nucula
  - †Nucula coloradoensis
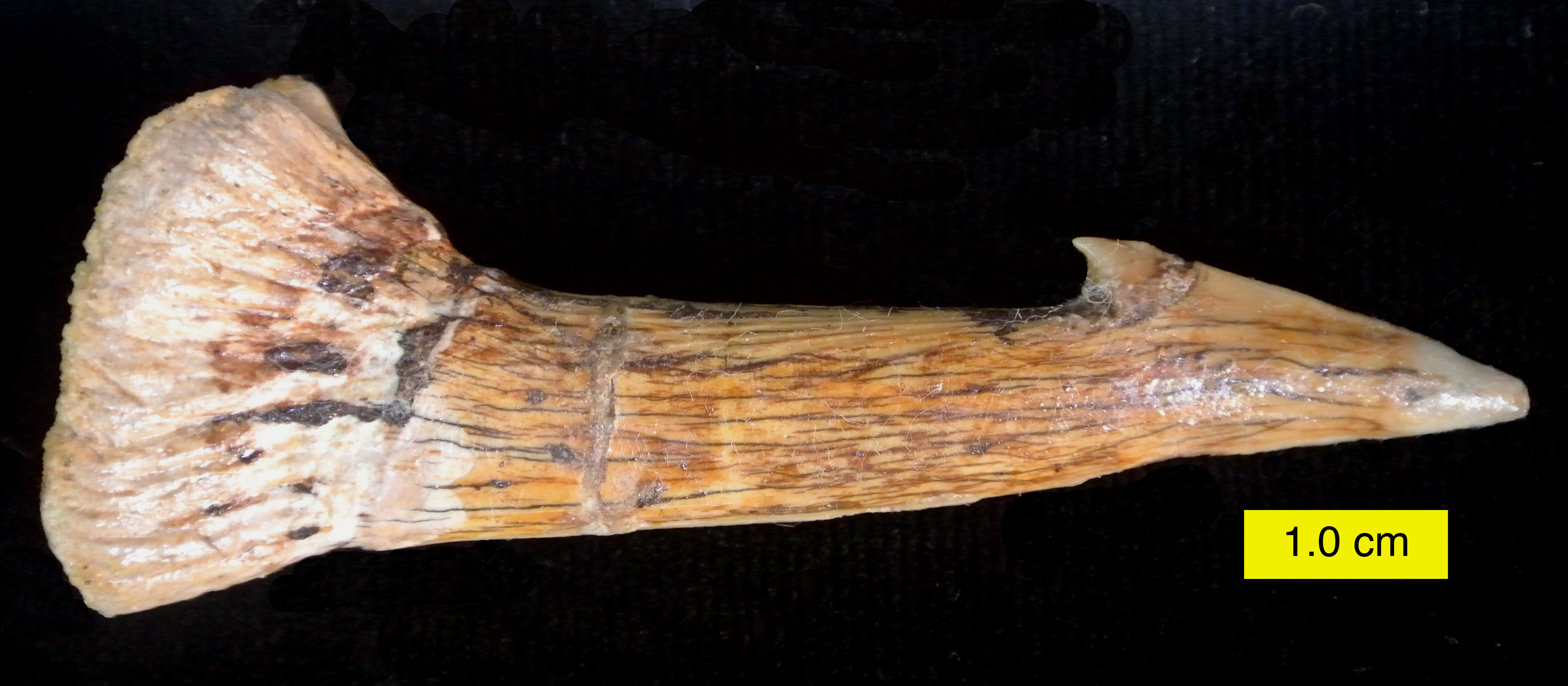
- Fossilized tooth of the Late Cretaceous giant sawfish Onchopristis
  †Onchopristis
  - †Onchopristis dunklei
- Ostrea
  - †Ostrea gilei
  - †Ostrea prudentia
  - †Ostrea soleniscus
  - †Ostrea staufferi
- Parapholas
  - †Parapholas sphenoideus
- †Pecten
  - †Pecten platessus
- Pholadomya
  - †Pholadomya coloradensis
  - †Pholadomya coloradoensis
- †Pinna
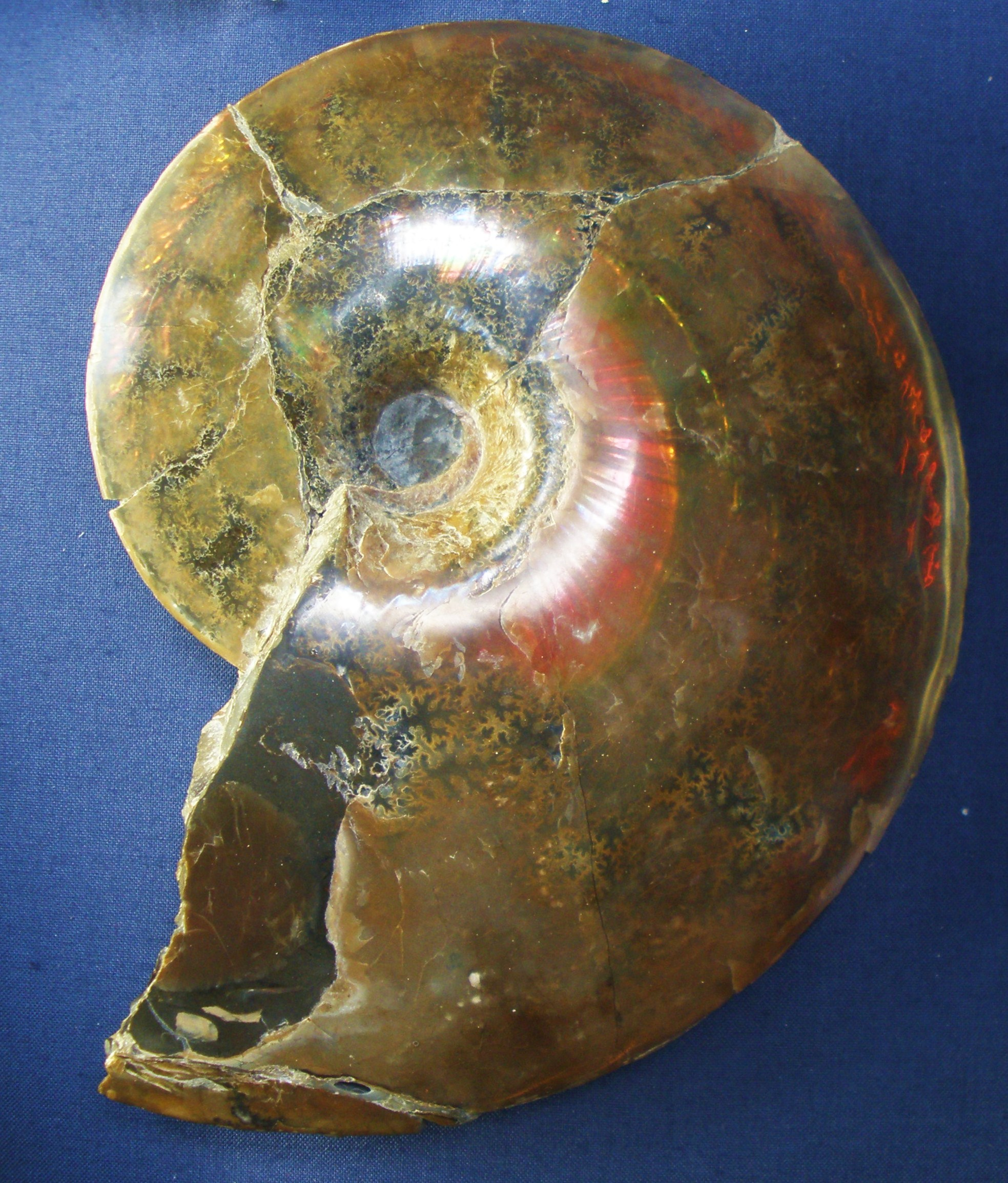
- Fossilized shell of the Late Cretaceous ammonoid cephalopod Placenticeras
  †Placenticeras
  - †Placenticeras pseudoplacenta
- Polinices
  - †Polinices concinna
- †Prionocyclus
  - †Prionocyclus novimexicanus
- †Protolamna
  - †Protolamna gigantea – type locality for species
- †Pseudoperna
  - †Pseudoperna congesta
- †Pteria
  - †Pteria gastrodes
- Rostellaria
  - †Rostellaria shumardi
- †Sanoarca
  - †Sanoarca siouxensis
- †Scaphites
  - †Scaphites corvensis
  - †Scaphites preventricosus
- Serpula
  - †Serpula bicarinata
- Siliqua
  - †Siliqua huerfanensis
- †Spermatites
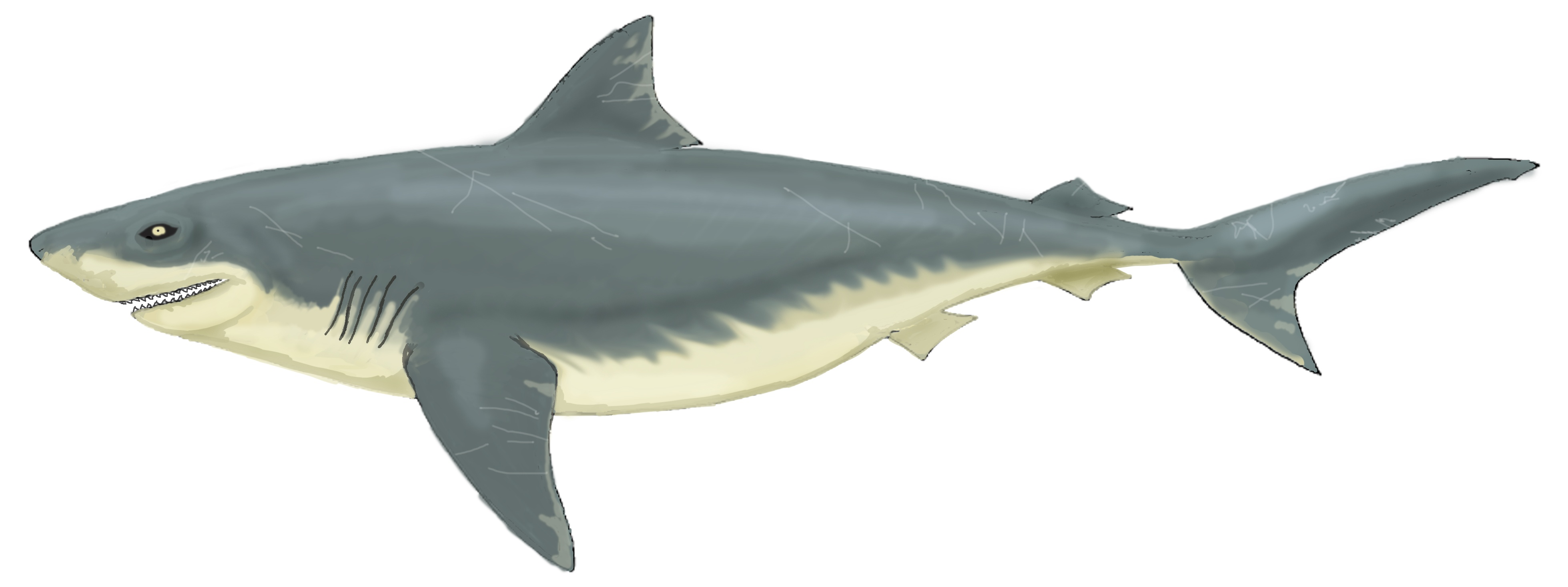
- Life restoration of the Late Cretaceous shark Squalicorax
  Squalicorax
  - †Squalicorax baharijensis
- Tapes (bivalve)
  - †Tapes cyprimeriformis
- Tellina
  - †Tellina calumetensis
- †Tenellisporites
  - †Tenellisporites spinatus
- Teredolites – tentative report
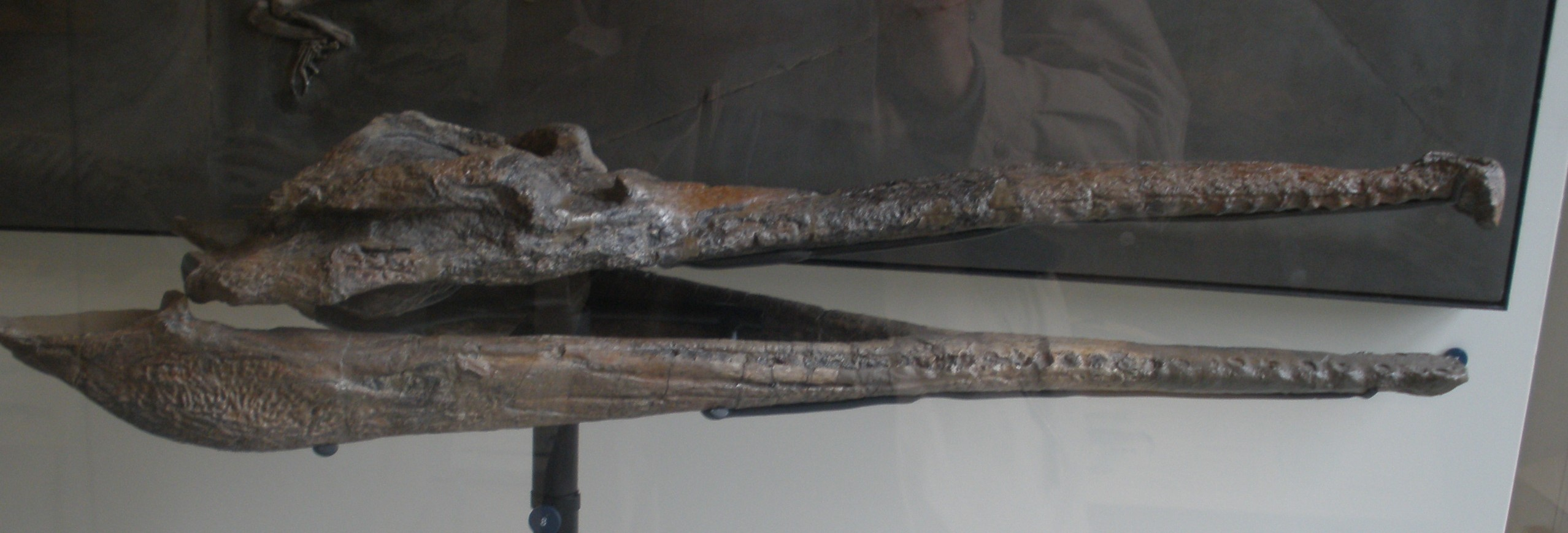
- Fossilized skull of the Late Cretaceous crocodilian relative Terminonaris
  †Terminonaris
  - †Terminonaris robusta – type locality for species
- †Volutoderma
  - †Volutoderma dalli
- Vulsella
- †Watinoceras
  - †Watinoceras coloradoense
- Yoldia
  - †Yoldia calumetensis

== Cenozoic ==
- Bison
  - †Bison antiquus
  - †Bison bison
- †Mammut
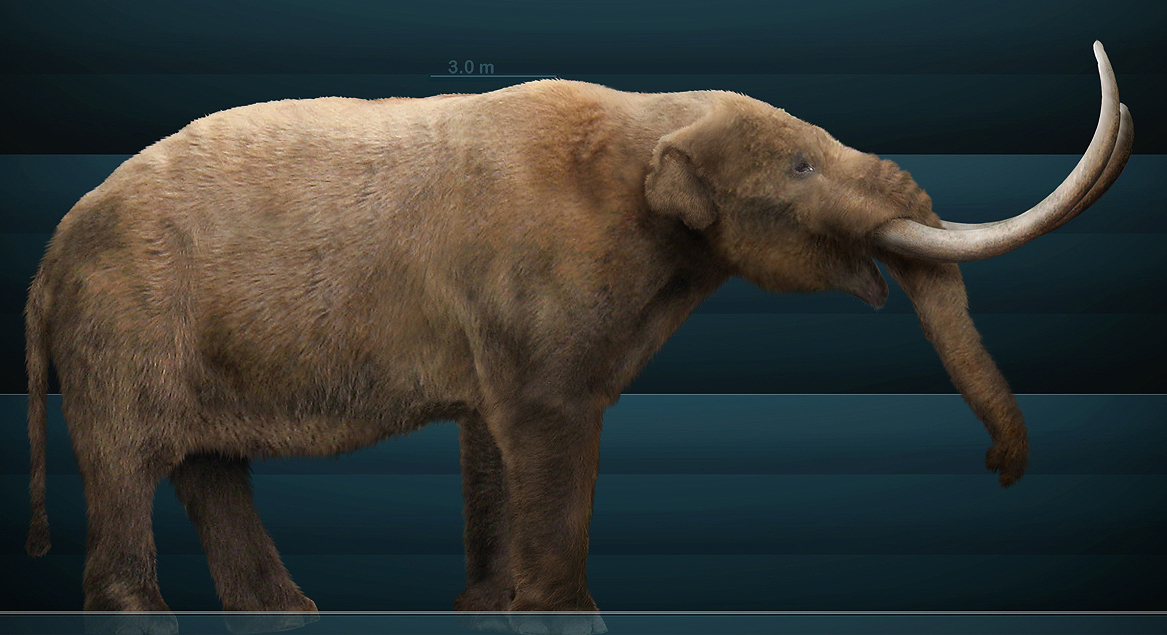
  - Restoration of a Mammut americanum, or American mastodon
    †Mammut americanum
- †Mammuthus
  - †Mammuthus columbi
- Castoroides
  - †Castoroides ohioensis
- Megalonyx
  - †Megalonyx jeffersonii
