= Kamerunoceras =

Kamerunoceras Temporal range: Cenomanian-Turonian 94.3–89.3 Ma

Scientific classification
- Kingdom: Animalia
- Phylum: Mollusca
- Class: Cephalopoda
- Subclass: †Ammonoidea
- Order: †Ammonitida
- Family: †Acanthoceratidae
- Subfamily: †Euomphaloceratinae
- Genus: †Kamerunoceras; Reyment, 1954

Species
- See text

Synonyms
- Schindewolfites Wiedmann, 1960; Polyaspidoceras Matsumoto, 1978

Genus of molluscs (fossil)

Kamerunoceras is an extinct cephalopod genus belonging to the ammonite family Acanthoceratidae, found in Upper Cretaceous formations (Cenomanian to Turonian age) of Africa, Europe and North and South America.

== Description ==
Kamerunoceras, named by R.A. Reyment in 1954, was tentatively included in the acanthoceratid subfamily Mammitinae in W.J. Arkell, et al (1957), but has since been combined with Euomphaloceras, previously of the Acanthoceratinae ibid, in the Euomphaloceratinae. Kamerunoceras is described as being very evolute with a rectangular whorl section and umbilical tubercles only in the middle growth section. Ventrolateral tubercles, found mostly throughout, are spinose. Ribs are irregular, straight at first, becoming denser and sigmoid on the outer whorl.

== Species ==
The following species of Kamerunoceras have been described:

- K. andinum Renz, 1982
- K. antsaronense Collignon, 1965
- K. calvertense Powell, 1963
- K. douvillei (Pervinquière, 1907)
- K. eschii (Solger, 1904)
- K. ganuzai Wiedmann, 1960
- K. inaequicostatus Wiedmann, 1960
- K. isovokyense Collignon, 1965
- K. lecointrei Collignon, 1966
- K. puebloense Cobban & Scott, 1972
- K. salmuriensis Courtiller, 1867
- K. schindewolfi Collignon, 1965
- K. tinrhertense Collignon, 1965
- K. turoniense D'Orbigny, 1850

== Distribution ==
Fossils of Kamerunoceras have been found in Austria, Brazil, Cameroon, Colombia (La Frontera and San Rafael Formations), Egypt, France, Mexico, Nigeria, Romania, Tunisia, United States (Arizona, New Mexico, Texas, Utah), Venezuela.
