= Euomphaloceratinae =

Euomphaloceratinae Temporal range: Early Cenomanian - Early Coniacian

Scientific classification
- Kingdom: Animalia
- Phylum: Mollusca
- Class: Cephalopoda
- Subclass: †Ammonoidea
- Order: †Ammonitida
- Family: †Acanthoceratidae
- Subfamily: †Euomphaloceratinae; Cooper, 1978

Genera
- see text

Extinct subfamily of ammonites

Euomphaloceratinae is a subfamily of Upper Cretaceous ammonites included in the Acanthoceratidae, characterized by generally evolute shells with quadrate whorl sections that are strongly ribbed. Sutures are ammonitic, but not overly complex.

Genera include:

- Burroceras
- Codazziceras
- Euomphaloceras, (type genus)
- Hourcqiceras
- Kamerunoceras
- Lotzeites
- Morrowites
- Paraburroceras
- Paramammites
- Pseudaspidoceras
- Romaniceras
- Shuparoceras

some of which have been removed from other taxa where originally placed.

Euomphaloceras, the type genus of the subfamily, was removed from the Acanthoceratinae sensu Arkell et al. 1957, Kamarunoceras and Pseuaspidoceras from the Mammitinae, sensu Arkell et al. 1957. Others were added since initial publication of the Treatise on Invertebrate Paleontology in 1957.
