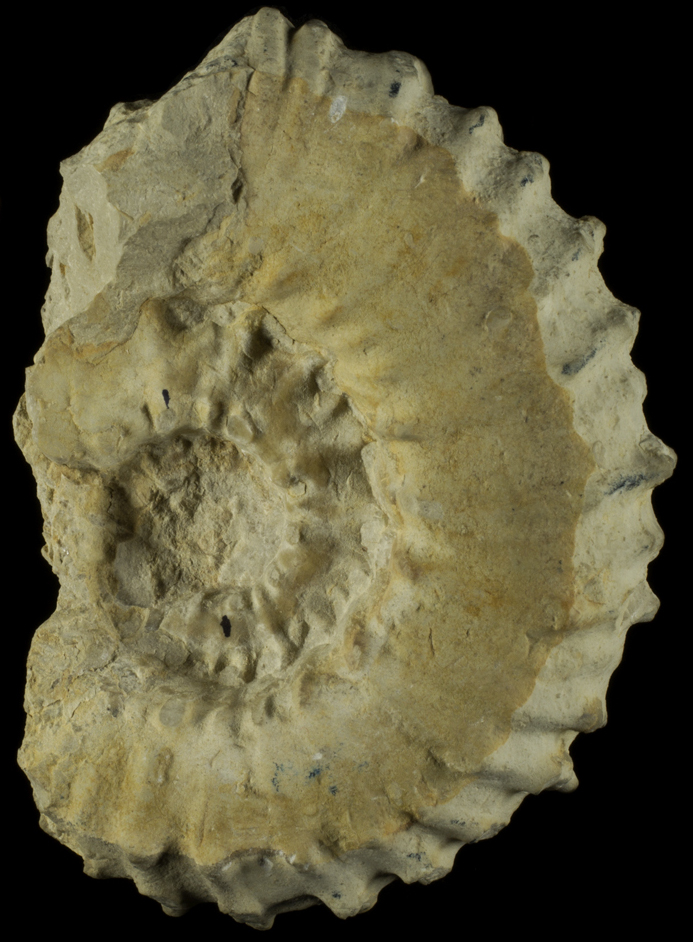
- Watinoceras coloradoense

Scientific classification
- Kingdom: Animalia
- Phylum: Mollusca
- Class: Cephalopoda
- Subclass: †Ammonoidea
- Order: †Ammonitida
- Family: †Acanthoceratidae
- Subfamily: †Acanthoceratinae
- Genus: †Watinoceras; Warren, 1930

Species
- W. amudariense Arkhanguelsky 1916; W. coloradoense Henderson 1908; W. jaekeli Solger 1904; W. reesidei Warren 1930; W. thompsonense Cobban 1988

= Watinoceras =

Watinoceras Temporal range: Turonian ~93.9–89.6 Ma

Genus of molluscs (fossil)

Watinoceras is a genus of acanthoceratid ammonite that lived during the early Turonian stage of the Late Cretaceous.

== Description ==
Early whorls are compressed, finely ribbed with inner and outer ventrolateral and siphonal tubercles as in Neocardioceras, but siphonal row is soon lost. Later the venter may be concave between rows of ventrolateral clavi or rounded with ribs passing over in chevrons. Ornament usually becomes coarser with age. Derivation is from Neocardioceras, Watinoceras and Mammites gave rise to the other genera in the subfamily Acanthoceratinae. Older classifications included Watinoceras in the subfamily Mammitinae instead.

Species include W. coloradoense, W. reesidei, and W. thompsonense.

== Biostratigraphic significance ==
The first occurrence of the species Watinoceras devonense marks the beginning of the Turonian.

== Distribution ==
Fossils of the genus have been found in:

- Ponta das Salinas, Angola
- Cotinguiba Formation, Brazil
- Mungo River Formation, Cameroon
- Blackstone Formation, Alberta, Canada
- Second White Speckled Shale and Kaskapu Formations, British Columbia
- McKenzie River Valley, Pacific Northwest
- Mesitas del Colegio and Yaguará, Colombia
- Brießnitz Formation, Germany
- Agua Nueva and Indidura Formations, Mexico
- Eze-Aku Formation, Nigeria
- Draa el Miaad, Tunisia
- Mancos Shale, Arizona and New Mexico
- Greenhorn Formation, Colorado and Minnesota
- Colorado Group, Colorado and New Mexico
- La Luna Formation, Venezuela
