= Conlinoceras =

Conlinoceras Temporal range: Late Cretaceous (Cenomanian)

Scientific classification
- Kingdom: Animalia
- Phylum: Mollusca
- Class: Cephalopoda
- Subclass: †Ammonoidea
- Order: †Ammonitida
- Family: †Acanthoceratidae
- Subfamily: †Acanthoceratinae
- Genus: †Conlinoceras; Cobban & Scott, 1972

Species
- See text

Genus of molluscs (fossil)

Conlinoceras, once included with Calycoceras as the subgenus Calycoceras (Conlinocras), is a strongly ribbed, evolute ammonite, belonging to the acanthoceratid subfamily Acanthoceratinae, known from the Cenomanian stage of the Upper Cretaceous. Shells are generally rapidly expanding with prominent, wide spaced, straight radial ribs that cross over the arched venter without interruption. Although somewhat similar in appearance to Calycoceras, Conlinoceras differs in having sparser, more widely spaced ribs.

The first (lowest) appearance of Conlinoceras tarrantense, which can reach a diameter of 12.5 cm ( 4.9 in), marks the base of the middle Cenomanian in Texas.
