= Euomphaloceras =

Euomphaloceras Temporal range: late Cenomanian

Scientific classification
- Kingdom: Animalia
- Phylum: Mollusca
- Class: Cephalopoda
- Subclass: †Ammonoidea
- Order: †Ammonitida
- Family: †Acanthoceratidae
- Subfamily: †Euomphaloceratinae
- Genus: †Euomphaloceras; Spath, 1923

Genus of molluscs (fossil)

Euomphaloceras is an early Upper Cretaceous ammonite genus, (Cephalopoda, Ammonoidea), included in the Acanthoceratinae until established as the type genus for the Euomphaloceratinae by Cooper, 1978.

The shell is very evolute, all whorls exposed, and rather depressed, with prominent umbilical and ventrolateral tubercles on some or all main ribs. The Venter broad and flat with three rows of tubercles that are more numerous than the ventrolateral ones. May have shallow ventral constrictions. Derivation is from an evolute Acathoceras.
