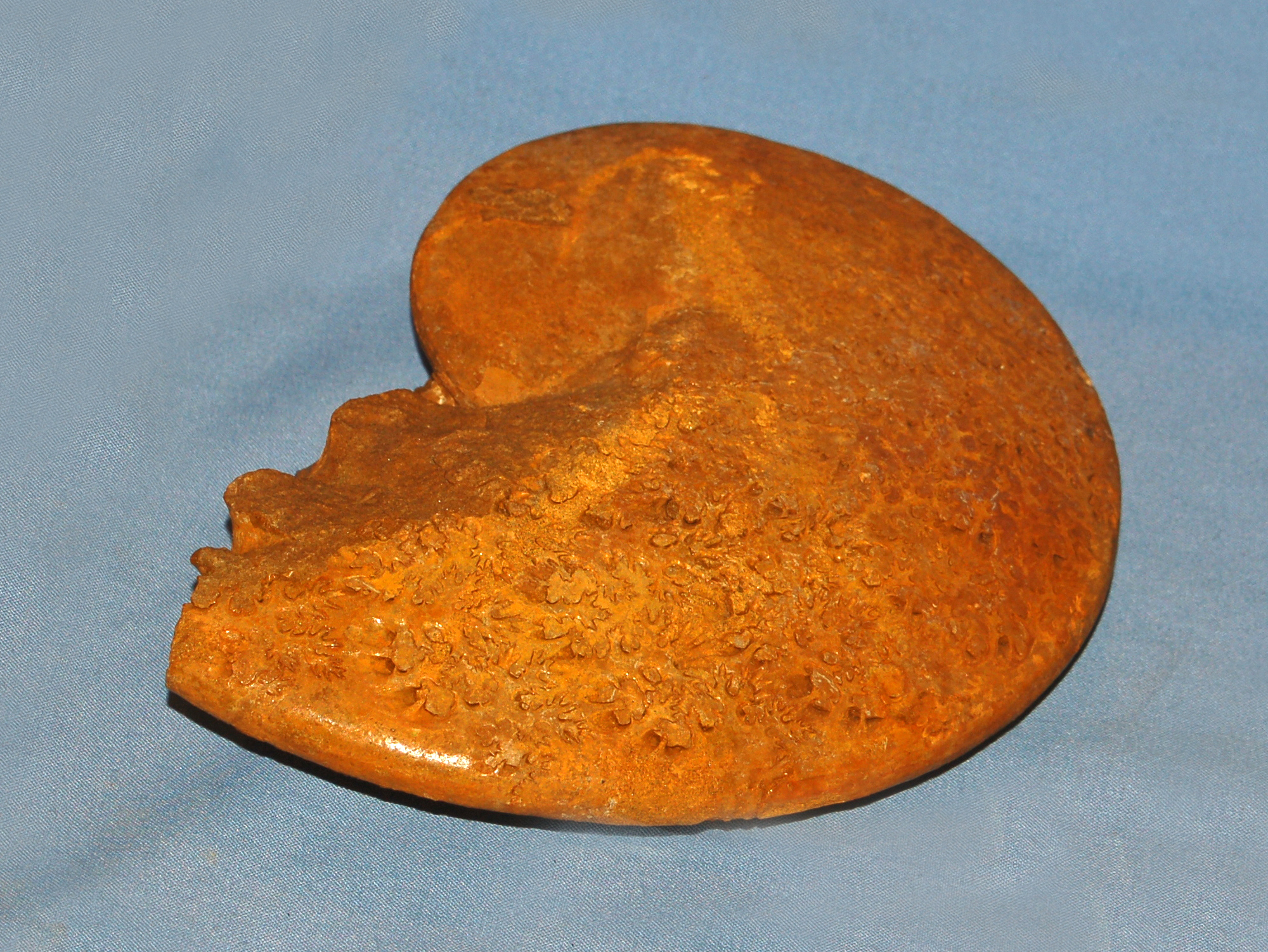
- Acompsoceras sp., Upper Cretaceous (Cenomanian), from Madagascar

Scientific classification
- Kingdom: Animalia
- Phylum: Mollusca
- Class: Cephalopoda
- Subclass: †Ammonoidea
- Order: †Ammonitida
- Family: †Acanthoceratidae
- Subfamily: †Acanthoceratinae
- Genus: †Acompsoceras; Schluter

Species
- See text

= Acompsoceras =

Acompsoceras Temporal range: Cretaceous

Genus of molluscs (fossil)

Acompsoceras is an extinct genus of cephalopod belonging to the Ammonite subclass. It grew to a large size compared to most ammonites. Its shell reached 18 inches (46 cm) in diameter when the animal reached adulthood. Acompsoceras appears in the fossil record during the early portion of the Cretaceous Cenomanian stage and goes extinct around the middle of that same stage.

== Species ==
Acompsoceras is in the same family as Acanthoceras, the Acanthoceratidae, and contains several species:

- A. amphibolum
- A. calabarense
- A. essendiense
- A. inconstans
- A. renevieri

== Distribution ==
Fossils of Acompsoceras have been found in Brazil, Colombia (Hiló Formation), Germany, Madagascar, Nigeria, the United Kingdom and Texas.
