= Romaniceras =

Romaniceras Temporal range: Late Cretaceous, Late Cenomanian - Late Turonian

Scientific classification
- Kingdom: Animalia
- Phylum: Mollusca
- Class: Cephalopoda
- Subclass: †Ammonoidea
- Order: †Ammonitida
- Family: †Acanthoceratidae
- Subfamily: †Euomphaloceratinae
- Genus: †Romaniceras; Spath, 1923

Genus of molluscs (fossil)

Romaniceras is a genus of Upper Cretaceous ammonites in the Acanthoceratidae subfamily Euomphaloceratinae.

The shell is rather evolute, whorl section circular to oval and Romaniceras differs from Acanthoceras in having 9 or 11 rows of tubercles, of which the ventrolateral may be clavate (i.e. elongate). The ribs of Romaniceras specimens are strong and fairly close spaced.
