= Aipe =

- Municipality and town
- Flag Coat of arms

- Location of the municipality and town of Aipe in the Huila Department of Colombia
- Coordinates: 3°13′N 75°14′W
- Country: Colombia
- Department: Huila Department
- Subregion: Subnorte
- Founded: 2 January 1741
- Founder: Teresa & Enrique Cortés

Government
  - Mayor: José Sevel Castro Tovar (2016-2019)

Area
  - Municipality and town: 801.04 km^{2} (309.28 sq mi)
- Elevation: 350 m (1,150 ft)

Population (2015)
  - Municipality and town: 26,219
  - Density: 32.731/km^{2} (84.773/sq mi)
  - Urban: 16,530
- Time zone: UTC-5 (Colombia Standard Time)
- Website: Official website

Aipe is a town and municipality in the Huila Department, Colombia. It is located on the west bank of the Magdalena River in the Central Ranges of the Colombian Andes at altitudes between 350 and 2,300 metres (1,150 and 7,550 ft). Aipe borders Natagaima, Ataco and Planadas of the department of Tolima in the north and west, Villavieja and Tello in the east, and the departmental capital Neiva in the south.

== History ==
In early 1741, Doña Teresa and Don Enríque Cortés, descendants of Mr. Jacinto Cortés, gave 80 hectares to establish a new town, and are considered the founders of the Aipe. In 1770, the church hierarchy and government in Neiva records the construction of the church of Our Lady of Sorrows.

In 1874, Aipe acquired autonomy from Neiva, as a member of the canton district of Villavieja and on 8 April 1912 by Ordinance No. 26, was created as a municipality by the Departmental Assembly.

== Geography ==
The municipality of Aipe is located on the left bank of the Magdalena River. It is located in the northwest of the Department of Huila, in the Magdalena Valley, bounded on the north and west by the Department of Tolima, to the east the Magdalena River, and south by the capital of Huila; Neiva.

The municipality has a total area of 801.04 km2 (3.8% total of the department). The lowest level of the municipality is located at the banks of the Magdalena River at an altitude of 350 metres (1,150 ft) above sea level, with an average annual temperature of 28.4 °C (83.1 °F). The highest point is 2,300 metres (7,500 ft) above sea level, located in the vereda La Union (west of the municipal boundary with the Department of Tolima), with an average temperature of 13.67 °C.

== Paleontology ==
In the Loma Gorda and Hondita Formations in Aipe, many Late Cretaceous (Cenomanian to Coniacian) species of ammonites have been found. The species Acanthoceras sp., Rhynchostreon sp., Choffaticeras sp., Fagesia catinus, Neoptychites cf. andinus, Mitonia gracilis, Morrowites sp., Nannovascoceras sp., Quitmaniceras sp., Benueites sp., Mytiloides kossmati, M. goppelnensis, Anomia sp., Paramammites sp., Hoplitoides sp., H. ingens, H. lagiraldae, Codazziceras ospinae, Allocrioceras sp., Prionocycloceras sp., P. guayabanum, Reesidites subtuberculatum, Subprionotropis colombianus, Mytiloides scupini, Dydimotis sp., Gauthiericeras sp., Anagaudryceras sp., Eulophoceras jacobi, Paralenticeras sieversi, Hauericeras madagascarensis, Peroniceras subtricarinatum, Forresteria sp., Barroisiceras onilahyense and Ankinatsytes venezolanus have been registered in Aipe.

== Climate ==
Climate data for Villavieja/Aipe, elevation 430 m (1,410 ft), (1981–2010)
Month	Jan	Feb	Mar	Apr	May	Jun	Jul	Aug	Sep	Oct	Nov	Dec	Year
Mean daily maximum °C (°F)	34.0 (93.2)	34.3 (93.7)	33.6 (92.5)	33.2 (91.8)	33.4 (92.1)	34.2 (93.6)	34.7 (94.5)	35.6 (96.1)	35.7 (96.3)	34.0 (93.2)	32.4 (90.3)	32.7 (90.9)	34.0 (93.2)
Daily mean °C (°F)	27.8 (82.0)	28.0 (82.4)	27.7 (81.9)	27.5 (81.5)	27.5 (81.5)	27.8 (82.0)	28.0 (82.4)	28.7 (83.7)	28.8 (83.8)	27.6 (81.7)	26.9 (80.4)	27.2 (81.0)	27.8 (82.0)
Mean daily minimum °C (°F)	22.0 (71.6)	22.2 (72.0)	22.2 (72.0)	22.1 (71.8)	22.0 (71.6)	21.6 (70.9)	21.6 (70.9)	22.1 (71.8)	22.4 (72.3)	22.1 (71.8)	22.0 (71.6)	22.0 (71.6)	22.0 (71.6)
Average precipitation mm (inches)	67.0 (2.64)	88.0 (3.46)	128.8 (5.07)	131.2 (5.17)	95.2 (3.75)	29.4 (1.16)	29.8 (1.17)	20.2 (0.80)	66.7 (2.63)	158.9 (6.26)	183.6 (7.23)	129.8 (5.11)	1,128.5 (44.43)
Average precipitation days	8	9	12	14	13	10	9	7	9	15	15	12	131
Average relative humidity (%)	71	70	72	73	72	69	65	61	62	69	75	74	69
Source: Instituto de Hidrologia Meteorologia y Estudios Ambientales
