= Benueites =

Benueites Temporal range: Turonian

Scientific classification
- Kingdom: Animalia
- Phylum: Mollusca
- Class: Cephalopoda
- Subclass: †Ammonoidea
- Order: †Ammonitida
- Family: †Acanthoceratidae
- Subfamily: †Acanthoceratinae
- Genus: †Benueites; Reyment, 1954

Species
- B. benueensis; B. mosquerae; B. reymenti; B. trinidadensis

Genus of molluscs (fossil)

Benueites is an extinct ammonoid cephalopod genus from the Late Cretaceous (Turonian), named by Revement, 1954, included in the family Acanthoceratidae, superfamily Acanthoceratoidea.

== Distribution ==
Cretaceous of Brazil, Cameroon, Colombia (Loma Gorda Formation, Aipe, Huila), Trinidad and Tobago, Venezuela
