= Codazziceras =

Codazziceras Temporal range: Turonian

Scientific classification
- Kingdom: Animalia
- Phylum: Mollusca
- Class: Cephalopoda
- Subclass: †Ammonoidea
- Order: †Ammonitida
- Family: †Acanthoceratidae
- Subfamily: †Euomphaloceratinae
- Genus: †Codazziceras; Etayo Serna, 1979

Type species
- C. scheibei

Species
- †C. ospinae; †C. scheibei

Genus of molluscs (fossil)

Codazziceras is an early Late Cretaceous ammonite from the Late Cretaceous of Colombia, distinguished from Lyelliceras (Lyelliceratidae) from which it is based and added to the Euomphaloceratinae (Acanthoceratidae). The type species is Codazziceras scheibei and another described species is C. ospinae. Fossils of Codazziceras have been found in the La Frontera Formation of Huila, Cundinamarca and Boyacá, and in the Loma Gorda Formation of Aipe, Huila.

== Etymology ==
The genus is named after Italian-Colombian geographer Agustín Codazzi.

== Description ==
The shell is rather evolute, ornamented with ribs and clavate tubercles. Ribs are fairly strong on the flanks but weaken as they cross the venter. Whorl section is compressed, moderately embracing, flanks convex, venter moderately flattened with three rows of tubercles that tend to be elongate in the direction of coiling.
