= Morrowites =

Morrowites Temporal range: Turonian 94.3–89.3 Ma

Scientific classification
- Domain: Eukaryota
- Kingdom: Animalia
- Phylum: Mollusca
- Class: Cephalopoda
- Subclass: †Ammonoidea
- Order: †Ammonitida
- Family: †Acanthoceratidae
- Subfamily: †Mammitinae
- Genus: †Morrowites; Cobban & Hook, 1983

Species
- † M. depressus; † M. dixeyi; † M. subdepressus; † M. wingi

Genus of molluscs (fossil)

Morrowites, named by Cobban and Hook, 1983, is a moderate to large-sized ammonite with quadrangular to depressed whorls, broadly rounded to depressed venter, low ribs, umbilical and inner and outer ventrolateral tubercles and smooth early whorls except for occasional ribs along weak constrictions. The suture is moderately simple and has an unusually broad bifid first lateral lobe. It is so far restricted to the Lower Turonian stage, in the mid Cretaceous.

Morrowites closely resembles Mammites, however Morrowites has a broad first lateral lobe, Mammites has a narrow one. The very early whorls of Morrowites are smooth except for distantly placed ribs and constrictions, those of Mammites have normal ribs and tubercles.

== Etymology ==
Morrowites is named in honor of A. L. Morrow who made a pioneering study of Cenomanian and Turonian ammonites of Kansas.

== Distribution ==
Fossils of Morrowites have been found in Colombia (Loma Gorda Formation, Aipe, Huila), France, Germany, Mexico, Nigeria, and the United States (Arizona, New Mexico).
