= Quitmaniceras =

Quitmaniceras Temporal range: Late Cretaceous (early Turonian)

Scientific classification
- Kingdom: Animalia
- Phylum: Mollusca
- Class: Cephalopoda
- Subclass: †Ammonoidea
- Order: †Ammonitida
- Family: †Acanthoceratidae
- Subfamily: †Acanthoceratinae
- Genus: †Quitmaniceras; Powell, 1963

Species
- See text

Genus of molluscs (fossil)

Quitmaniceras is a genus of small, compressed, fairly evolute ammonites from the lower Turonian of Grant County, New Mexico and Trans-Pecos Texas, included in the subfamily Acanthoceratinae. The shell has a carinate venter in juveniles and one that is arched in adults, usually with a raised siphonal line,(siphonal referring to the marginal siphuncle). Ribs are very weak to moderately strong, flexious, typically sloping forward toward the rim, bending further forward at the outer shoulder.

== Distribution ==
Fossils of Quitmaniceras have been found in Colombia (Loma Gorda Formation, Aipe, Huila), Mexico and the United States (Arizona and Texas).
