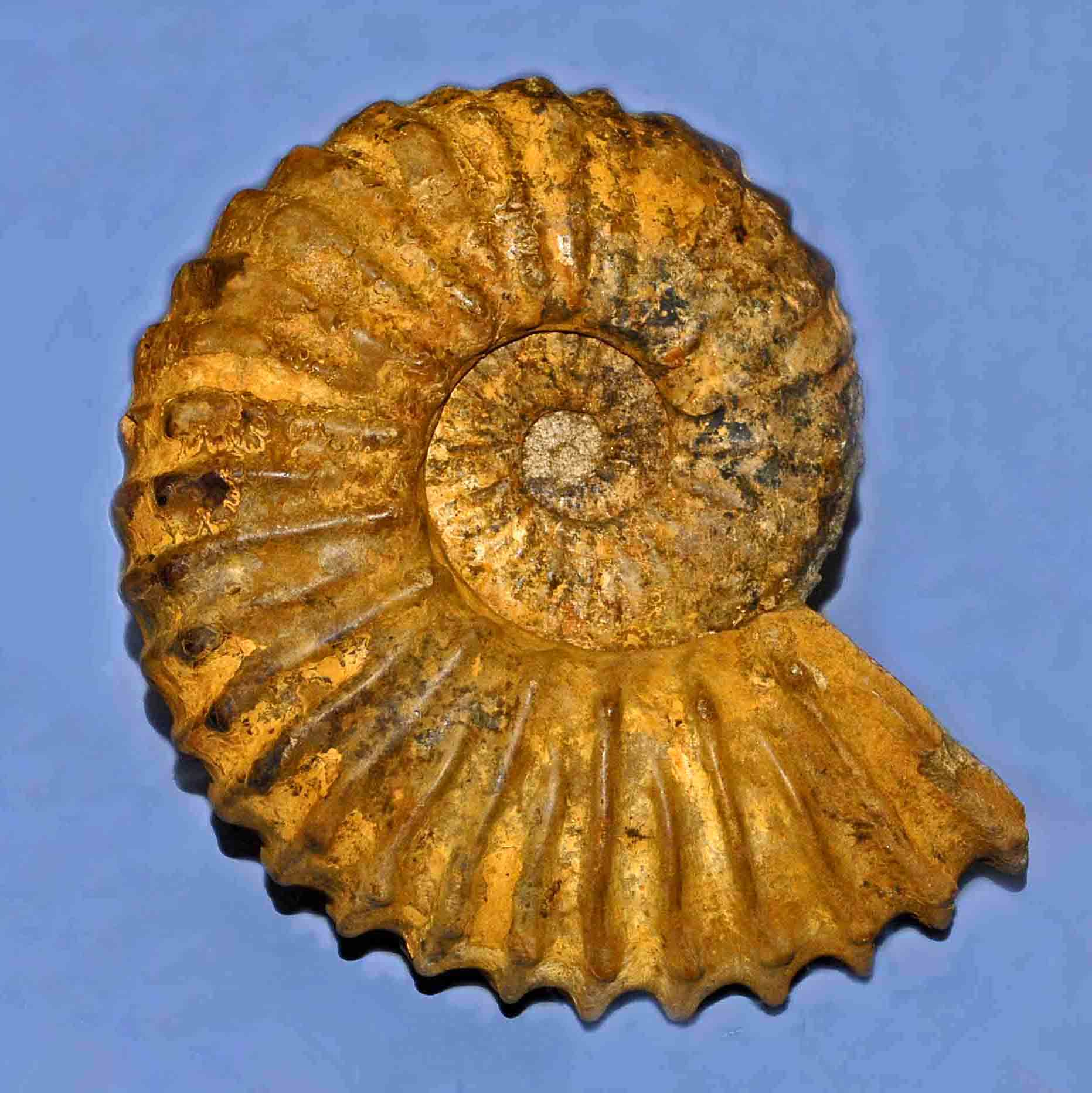
- E. pentagonus

Scientific classification
- Kingdom: Animalia
- Phylum: Mollusca
- Class: Cephalopoda
- Subclass: †Ammonoidea
- Order: †Ammonitida
- Family: †Acanthoceratidae
- Subfamily: †Acanthoceratinae
- Genus: †Eucalycoceras; Spath, 1923

Species
- See text

= Eucalycoceras =

Eucalycoceras Temporal range: Cretaceous, 99.7–94.3 Ma

Genus of molluscs (fossil)

Eucalycoceras is an extinct genus of cephalopods belonging to the Ammonite subclass.

== Species ==
- E. collignoni Fabre, 1940
- E. denizoti Fabre, 1940
- E. gothicum Kossmat, 1895
- E. pentagonus Jukes-Browne, 1896

== Description ==
Eucalycoceras are medium-sized ammonites, generally compressed, with flattened flanks and venter with dense tuberculate ribs.

== Distribution ==
Fossils of this genus have been found in the Cretaceous of Antarctica, Brazil, France, the United Kingdom and United States.

== See also ==
- List of ammonite genera
