= Utaturiceras =

Utaturiceras Temporal range: U Cretaceous (Cenom)

Scientific classification
- Kingdom: Animalia
- Phylum: Mollusca
- Class: Cephalopoda
- Subclass: †Ammonoidea
- Order: †Ammonitida
- Family: †Acanthoceratidae
- Genus: †Utaturiceras

Utaturiceras is an upper Cretaceous (Cenomanian) ammonitid belonging to the family Acanthoceratidae and subfamily Mantelliceratinae.

Utaturiceras is described in Matsumoto et al. 2003 as having a fairly large shell at maturity, with a body chamber about half a whorl in length; whorls higher than broad and more or less involute; ribs in juvenile stage gently flexious and unequal in length, longer ones arising from bullate umbilical tubercles; shorter ones branched or intercalated; adult shell ornamented by equally long ribs and weakening tubercles. The suture has somewhat phylloid saddle endings.

Note that Matsumoto, et al., follow Cobban and Kennedy in referring to the Ammonoidea as an order in the Cephalopoda rather than as a subclass as often done.
