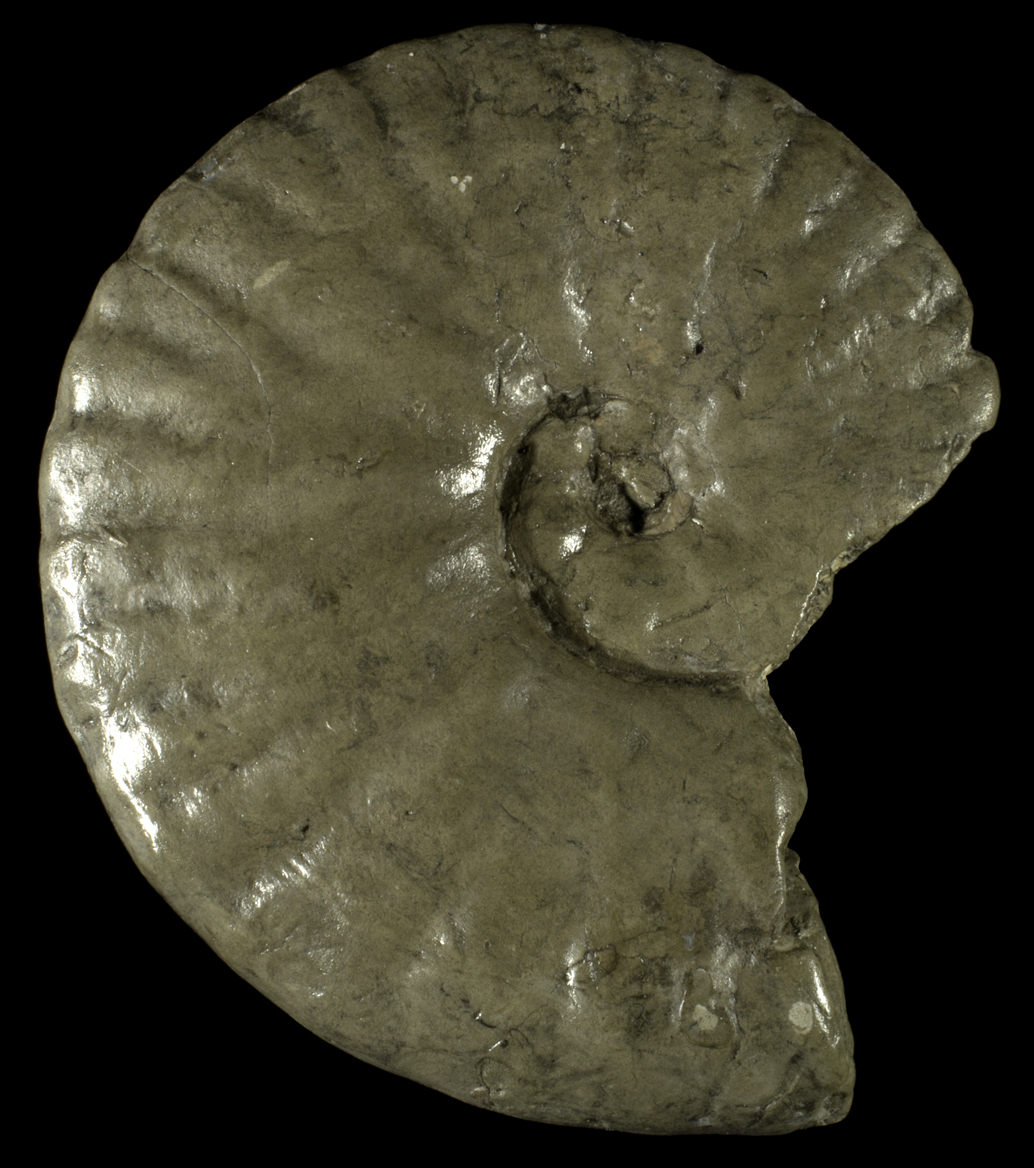
- Metoicoceras geslinianum lectotype

Scientific classification
- Kingdom: Animalia
- Phylum: Mollusca
- Class: Cephalopoda
- Subclass: †Ammonoidea
- Order: †Ammonitida
- Family: †Acanthoceratidae
- Subfamily: †Mammitinae
- Genus: †Metoicoceras; Hyatt, 1903

Species
- M. bergquisti; M. geslinianum; M. swallovi

= Metoicoceras =

Metoicoceras Temporal range: Cenomanian

Genus of molluscs (fossil)

Metoioceras is an extinct genus of cephalopod belonging to the Ammonite subclass which lived during the Cenomanian.
