= Neocardioceras =

Neocardioceras Temporal range: Late Cretaceous (latest Cenomanian)

Scientific classification
- Kingdom: Animalia
- Phylum: Mollusca
- Class: Cephalopoda
- Subclass: †Ammonoidea
- Order: †Ammonitida
- Family: †Acanthoceratidae
- Subfamily: †Acanthoceratinae
- Genus: †Neocardioceras; Spath, 1926

Species
- see text

Genus of molluscs (fossil)

Neocardioceras is a genus of evolute acanthoceratid ammonites from the uppermost Cenomanian, Upper Cretaceous, of Europe, western U.S. and Brazil.

As described in Cobban, Hook & Kenneday, 1989, Neocardioceras is a fairly small, moderately evolute, generally compressed ammonite that has prominent and very numerous rectoradiate to prorsiradate ribs and umbilical, inner and outer, and siphonal (mid ventral) tubercles. Primary ribs begin in the umbilicus or rise from umbilical tubercles and secondary ribs arise further out on the flank. The ribs bend forward at the position of the inner ventrolateral tubercles and cross the venter as chevrons, where they support the outer ventrolateral and siphonal tubercles.

Neocardioceras was proposed by Spath, 1926, for ammonites "resembling Prionocyclus Meek, except for the Quenstedtoceras keel". Wright, 1957, subsequently described Neocardioceras as evolute, compressed, with sharp umbilical and double ventrolateral tubercles (inner and outer per side) and a row of close round siphonal (mid ventral) tubercles that tend to form a nodose keel (Questedtoceras comparison of Spath). Tubercles may disappear on outer whorls leaving fine sharp ribs.

Sharper ribs, a more fastigate (gable roof) venter, and much closer siphonal tubercles help distinguish Neocardioceras from the otherwise similar Protocardioceras.
