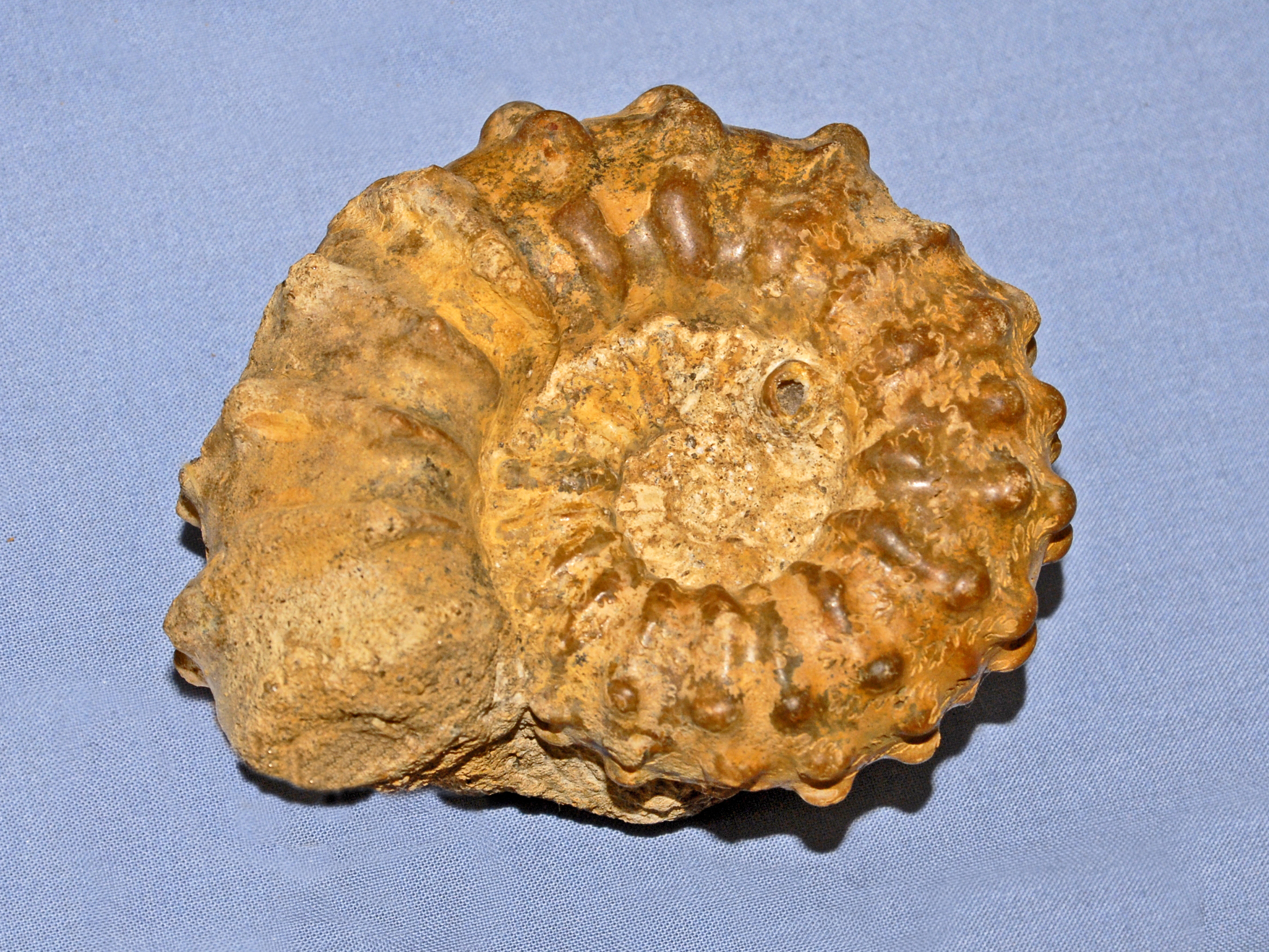
- M. nodosoides fossil from Madagascar

Scientific classification
- Kingdom: Animalia
- Phylum: Mollusca
- Class: Cephalopoda
- Subclass: †Ammonoidea
- Order: †Ammonitida
- Family: †Acanthoceratidae
- Subfamily: †Mammitinae
- Genus: †Mammites; Laube & Bruder, 1887

Species
- See text

= Mammites =

Mammites Temporal range: Cenomanian-Turonian

Genus of molluscs (fossil)

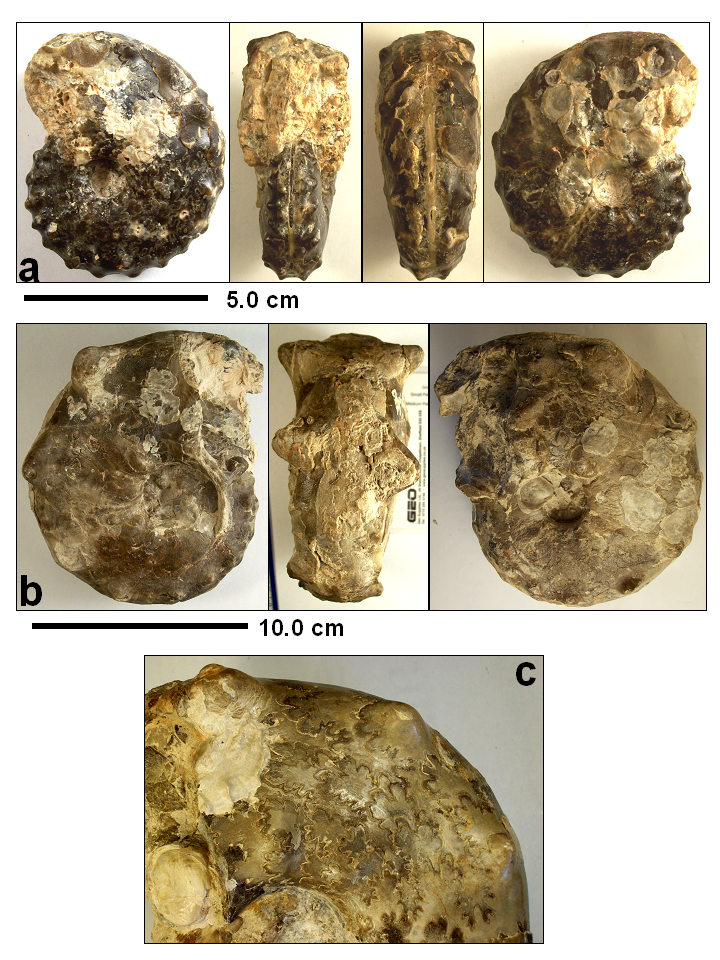
M. nodosoides a) juvenile; b) adult; c) sutural pattern

Mammites is a Late Cretaceous (Cenomanian to Turonian) ammonite genus included in the acanthoceratoidean family, Acanthoceratidae, and the type genus for the subfamily Mammitinae. Mammites was named by Laube and Bruder in 1887.

== Species ==
Species within the genus Mammites include:

- M. mohavanensis Böse, 1923 - found at Loma el Macho, Coahuila, Mexico
- M. mutabilis Reyment, 1955 - known from Cameroon
- M. nodosoides Schlüter, 1871 - found in North and South America, Africa and Europe
- M. powelli Kennedy et al., 1987 - found in Texas and Colombia
- M. rancheriae Anderson, 1958 - known from the North American Pacific region

== Description ==
Shells of Mammites are typically stout, usually with a rectangular or squarish whorl section and flattish to slightly concave venter and can reach a diameter of 15–20 millimeters (0.59–0.79 in). Ornamentation is dominated by strong umbilical tubercles and moderate inner and outer ventrolateral tubercles. Ribs are somewhat prominent in juveniles stages but tend to become inconspicuous in the adult. The suture is ammonitic but rather simple. Some species, those with broad first lateral lobes in the suture, have been reassigned to Morrowites

Mammites and Morrowites are rather similar except that Mammites as redefined has a narrow first later lobe while that in Morrowites is broad and the early whorls in Morrowites are smooth except for widely spaced ribs and constrictions while those in Mammites have normal ribs and tubercles.

== Distribution ==
Fossils of species within this genus have been found in the Late Cretaceous formations of Angola, Brazil, Cameroon, Colombia (La Frontera, Boyacá, Cundinamarca and Huila) and San Rafael Formations, Egypt, France, India, Madagascar, Mexico, Nigeria, Peru, Romania, Tunisia, United States and Venezuela.

== Palaeoecology ==
Bite traces on a Turonian-aged specimen of M. nodosoides from Czechia indicate that the individual experienced a fatal predatory attack by a mosasauroid.
