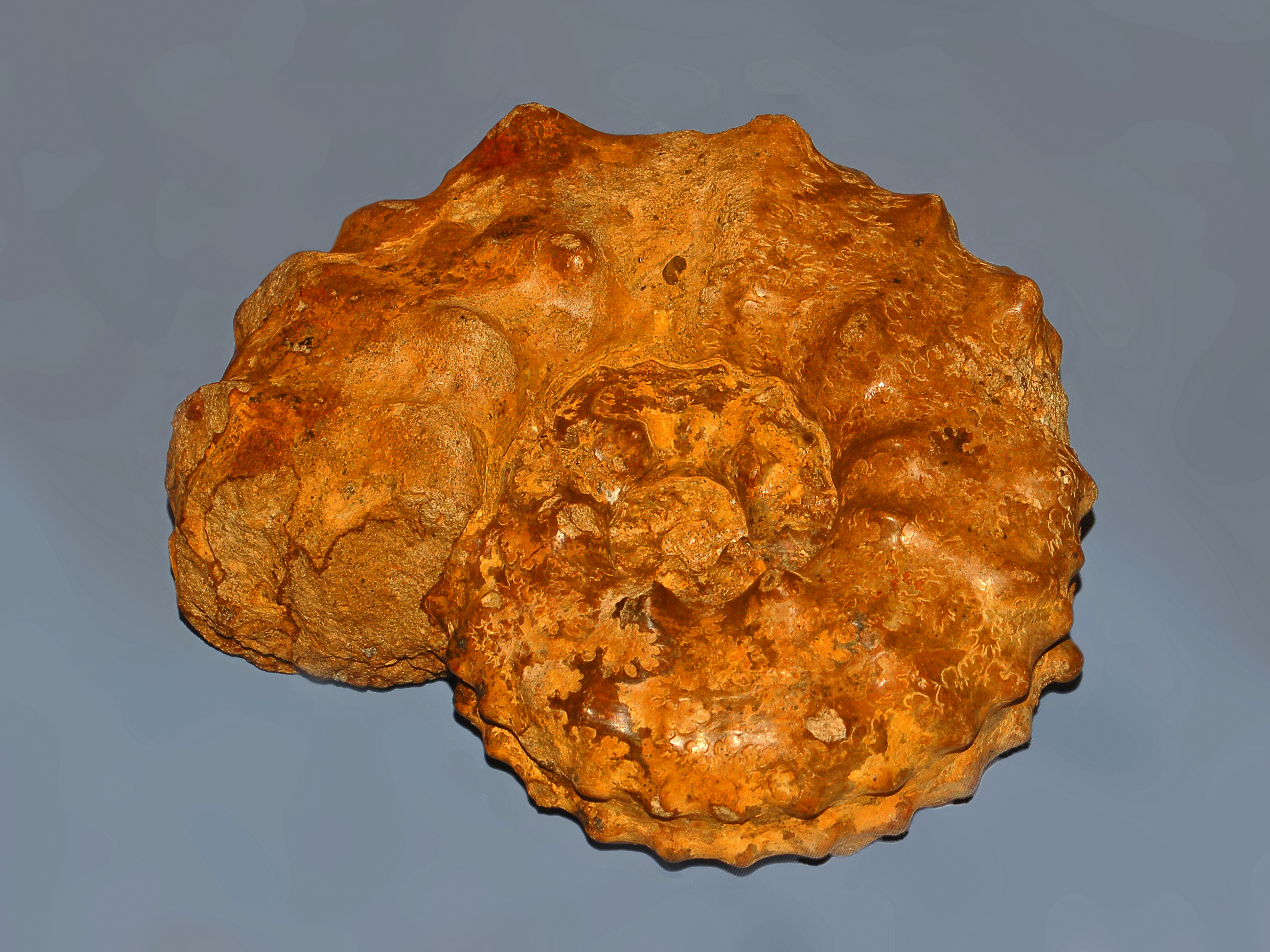
- Pseudoaspidoceras conciliatum, Upper Cretaceous (Turonian) from Madagascar

Scientific classification
- Kingdom: Animalia
- Phylum: Mollusca
- Class: Cephalopoda
- Subclass: †Ammonoidea
- Order: †Ammonitida
- Family: †Acanthoceratidae
- Genus: †Pseudoaspidoceras; Dollfus, 1904

= Pseudoaspidoceras =

Pseudoaspidoceras Temporal range: Turonian 94.3–89.3 Ma

Genus of molluscs (fossil)

Pseudoaspidoceras is an extinct genus of ammonites in the family Acanthoceratidae.

These cephalopods lived during the Turonian stage of the Upper Cretaceous, between 93.5 ± 0.8 Ma and 89.3 ± 1 Ma (million years ago). Their shells reached a diameter of 90–120 mm and had ornate ribs.

== Distribution ==
Fossils of Pseudoaspidoceras have been found in Brazil, Nigeria and Peru.
