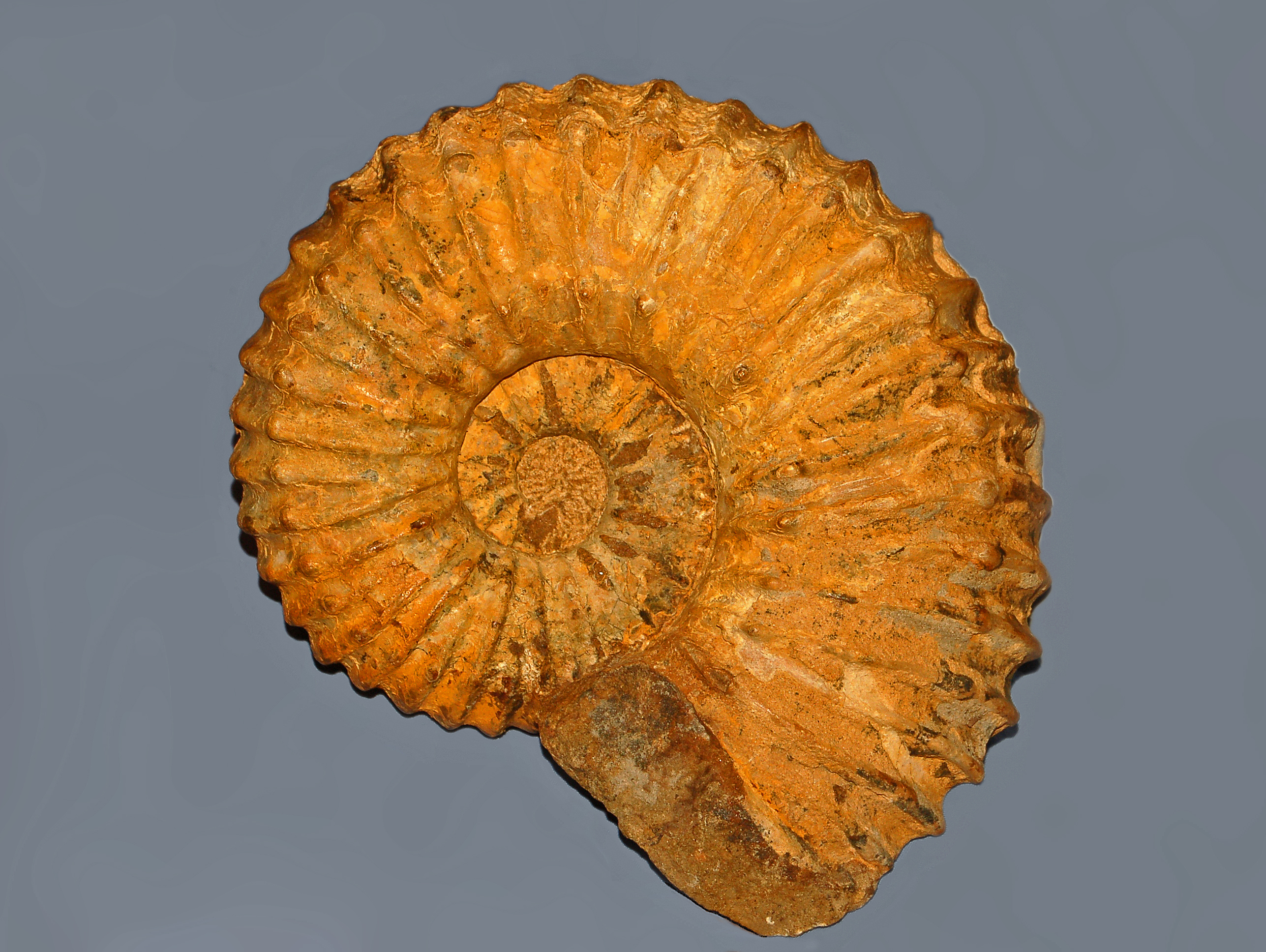
- Calycoceras asiaticum spinosum, Late Cretaceous (Cenomanian) from Madagascar, abt. 94 Mya

Scientific classification
- Kingdom: Animalia
- Phylum: Mollusca
- Class: Cephalopoda
- Subclass: †Ammonoidea
- Order: †Ammonitida
- Family: †Acanthoceratidae
- Subfamily: †Acanthoceratinae
- Genus: †Calycoceras; Hyatt, 1900

Species
- See text

Synonyms
- Newboldiceras

= Calycoceras =

Calycoceras Temporal range: Cretaceous

Genus of molluscs (fossil)

Calycoceras is an extinct genus of cephalopods belonging to the subclass Ammonoidea and family Acanthoceratidae that lived during the Cenomanian stage of the Late Cretaceous, 100-94 Mya. Their shells had ornate ribs.

== Species ==
- C. algeriense Kennedy & Gale, 2017
- C. annulatum Collignon, 1964
- C. asiaticum (Jimbo, 1894)
  - C. a. asiaticum (Jimbo, 1894)
  - C. a. spinosum (Kossmat, 1897)
- C. besairieri Collignon, 1937
- C. boreale Kennedy, Cobban & Landman, 1996
- C. dromense (Thomel, 1972)
- C. cenomanense (d’Archiac, 1846)
- C. navicularis (Mantell, 1822)
- C. orientale Matsumoto, Saito & Fukada
- C. paucinodatum (Crick)
- C. tarrantense

== Distribution ==
Calycoceras species may be found in the Cretaceous of Angola, Antarctica, Canada (British Columbia), France, Germany, Japan, Nigeria, Oman, Russia, the United Kingdom, United States (Alaska, Arizona, Kansas, New Mexico, South Dakota, Utah)

C. asiaticum may be found in the Cenomanian of Canada, Southern England, northern and southern France, Spain, Romania, Bulgaria, Tunisia, Madagascar, south India and Japan.

C. cenomanense may be found in the Cenomanian of United Kingdom, France and Madagascar.

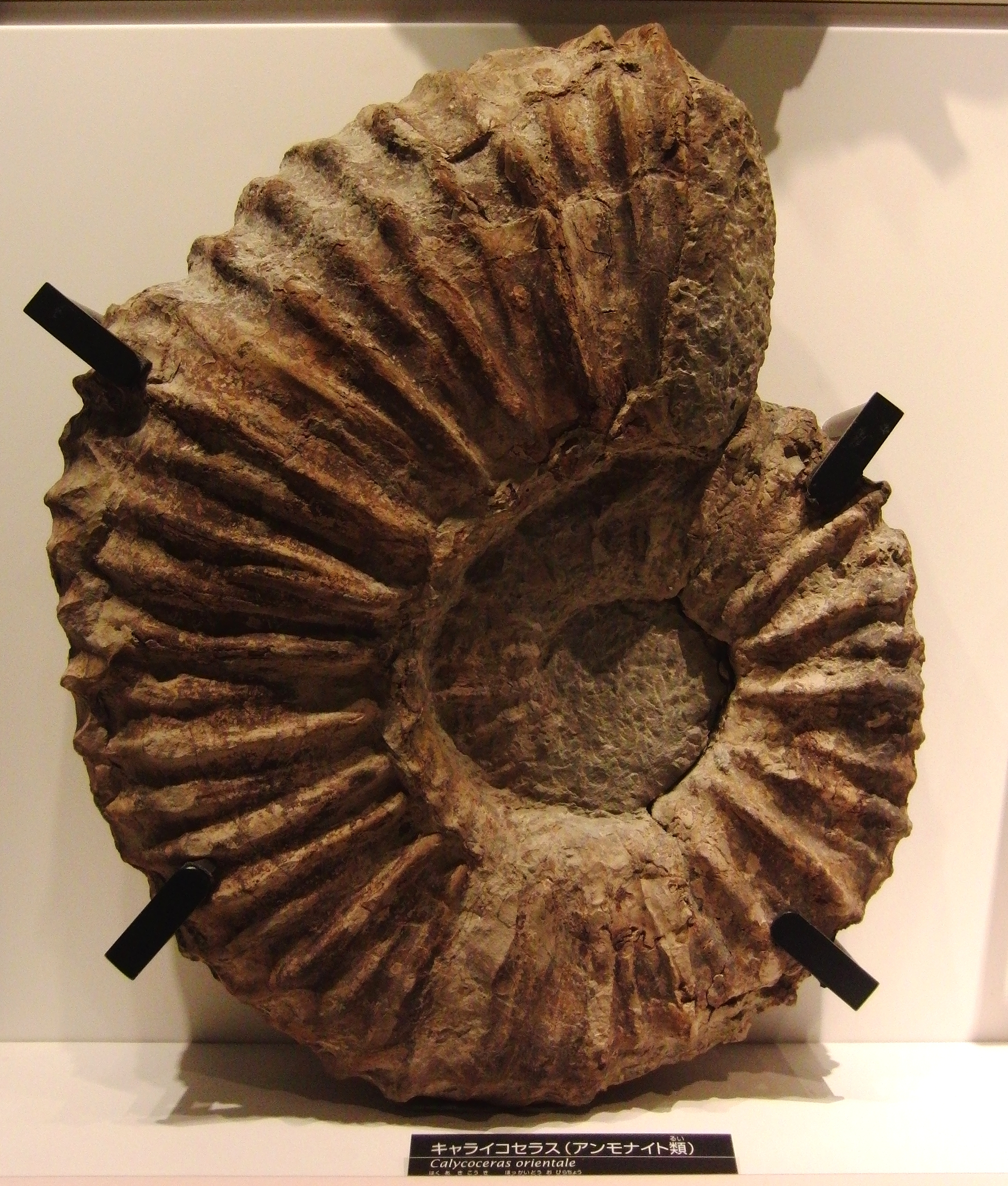
Calycoceras orientale, Late Cretaceous from Japan.

== Description ==
Shells of Calycoceras asiaticum may reach a diameter of about 20 centimetres (7.9 in). The larger phragmocones may reach 59–72 millimetres (2.3–2.8 in) in diameter. Coiling is moderately involute. All ribs show strong subspinose tubercles. C. asiaticum asiaticum and C. asiaticum spinosum are very similar, the latter has much more robust tuberculation.
