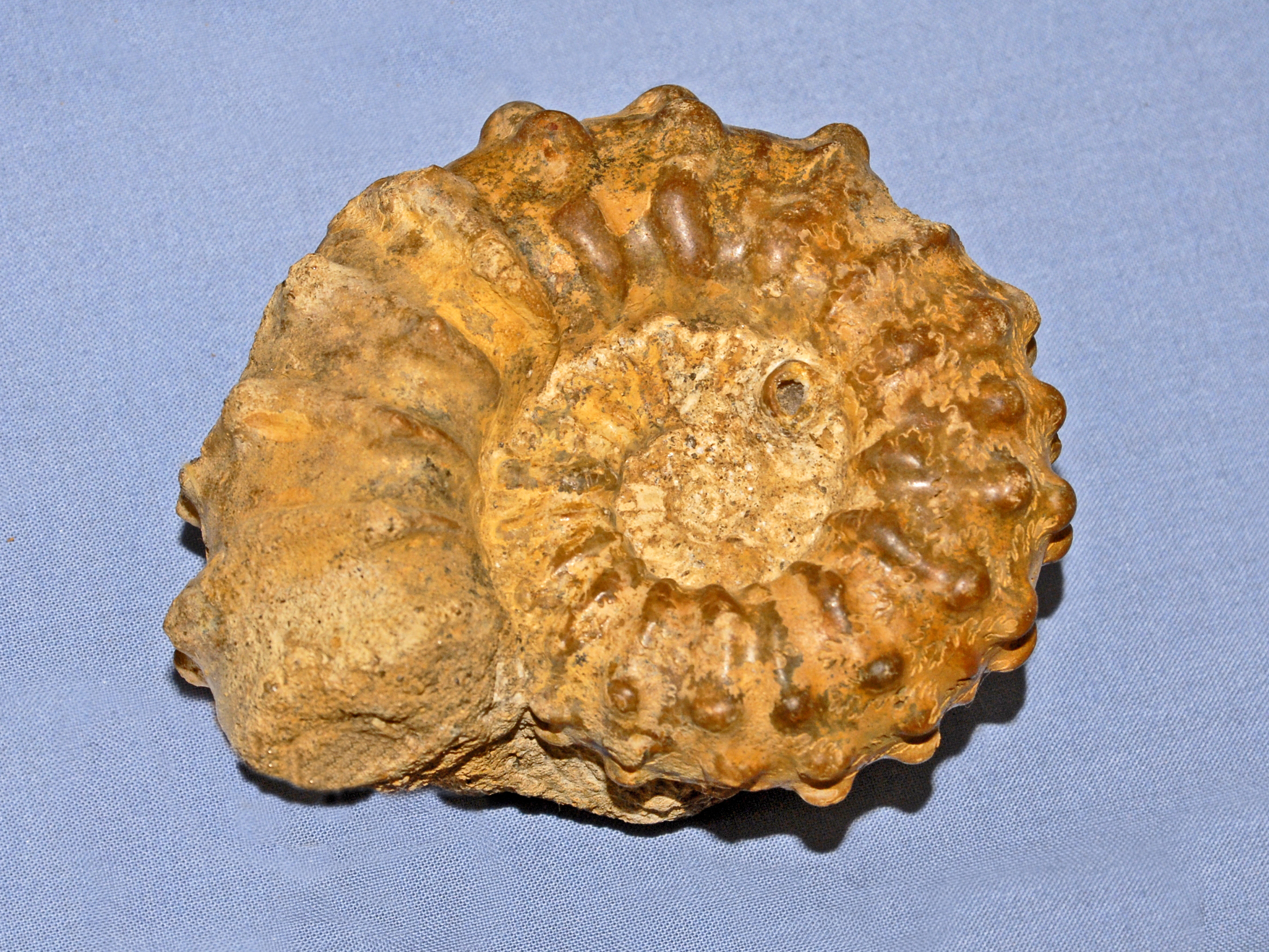
- Mammites nodosoides fossil

Scientific classification
- Kingdom: Animalia
- Phylum: Mollusca
- Class: Cephalopoda
- Subclass: †Ammonoidea
- Order: †Ammonitida
- Family: †Acanthoceratidae
- Subfamily: †Mammitinae; Hyatt, 1900

Genera
- See text

= Mammitinae =

Mammitinae Temporal range: early Turonian

Extinct subfamily of molluscs

Mammitinae comprises a subfamily within the Acanthoceratidae (Ammonoidea) characterized by moderately to very evolute shells with rectangular to squarish whorl sections along with blunt umbilical and prominent inner and outer ventrolateral tubercles on sparse ribs that may be round and strong, sharp and narrow, or absent. The suture is somewhat simpler than that of the Acanthoceratinae. Range is restricted to the lower Turonian stage of the Upper Cretaceous.

Genera include:

- Buccinammonites
- Buchiceras
- Cryptometoicoceras
- Dunverganoceras Warren & Stelck, 1940
- Mammites Laube & Bruden, 1886
- Metasigaloceras Hyatt, 1903
- Metoicoceras Hyatt, 1903
- Mitonia
- Nannometoicoceras
- Parabuchiceras
- Paracompsoceras
- Plesiacanthoceras
- Praemetoicoceras
- Pseudoaspidoceras Hyatt, 1903
- Rhamphidoceras
- Spathites
- Texacanthoceras
