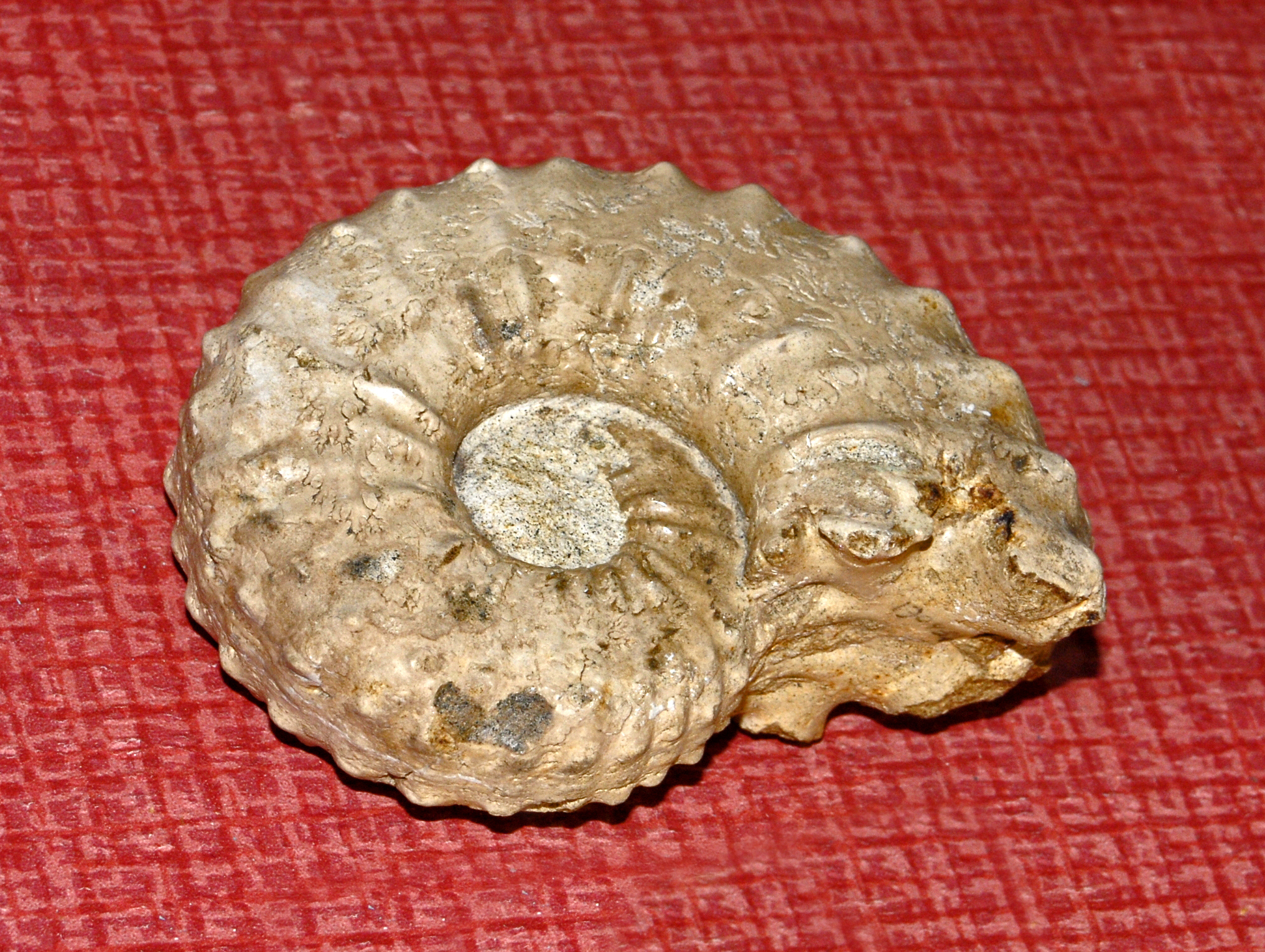
- Acanthoceras rhotomagensis from France.

Scientific classification
- Kingdom: Animalia
- Phylum: Mollusca
- Class: Cephalopoda
- Subclass: †Ammonoidea
- Order: †Ammonitida
- Family: †Acanthoceratidae
- Subfamily: †Acanthoceratinae; Grossouvre, 1894

Genera
- See text

= Acanthoceratinae =

Acanthoceratinae Temporal range: Cretaceous

Extinct subfamily of molluscs

The Acanthoceratinae comprise a subfamily of ammonoid cephalopods that lived during the Late Cretaceous from the latter early Cenomanian to the late Turonian

Shells are evolute, tuberculate and ribbed, with subquadrate to squarish whorl section wherein tubercles typically dominate over ribs. Derivation is from the Mantellicertinae in the early Cenomanian. Gave rise through Neocardioceras to the Mammitinae.

== Genera ==
The following genera are included in the Acanthoceratinae according to various sources as indicated.

- Acanthoceras Neumayer, 1875
- Acompsoceras Hyatt, 1903
- Alzadites
- Benueites Reyment, 1954
- Calycoceras Hyatt, 1900
- Conlinoceras Cobban & Scott, 1972
- Cunningtoniceras Collignon, 1937
- Eucalycoceras Spath, 1923
- Hypacanthohoplites Spath, 1923
- Kastanoceras
- Kennediella
- Microsulcatoceras
- Nebraskites Kennedy & Cobban, 1988
- Neocardioceras Spath, 1926
- Nigericeras Schneegan, 1943
- Paraconlinoceras
- Plesiacanthoceratoides
- Prohauericeras
- Protacanthoceras Spath, 1923
- Pseudocalycoceras Thomel, 1969
- Pseudovascoceras
- Quitmaniceras Powell, 1963
- Sumitomoceras
- Tarrantoceras
- Tunesites
- Thomelites
- Watinoceras Warren, 1930 (Watinoceras has also been classified under Mammitinae)

== Distribution ==
Fossils of species within the Acanthoceratinae have been found in Upper Cretaceous sediments in Angola, Antarctica, Australia, Brazil, Canada, Denmark, Egypt, France, Germany, Japan, Jordan, Madagascar, Mexico, Nigeria, Oman, Peru, Russia, Switzerland, United Kingdom, United States and Venezuela.
