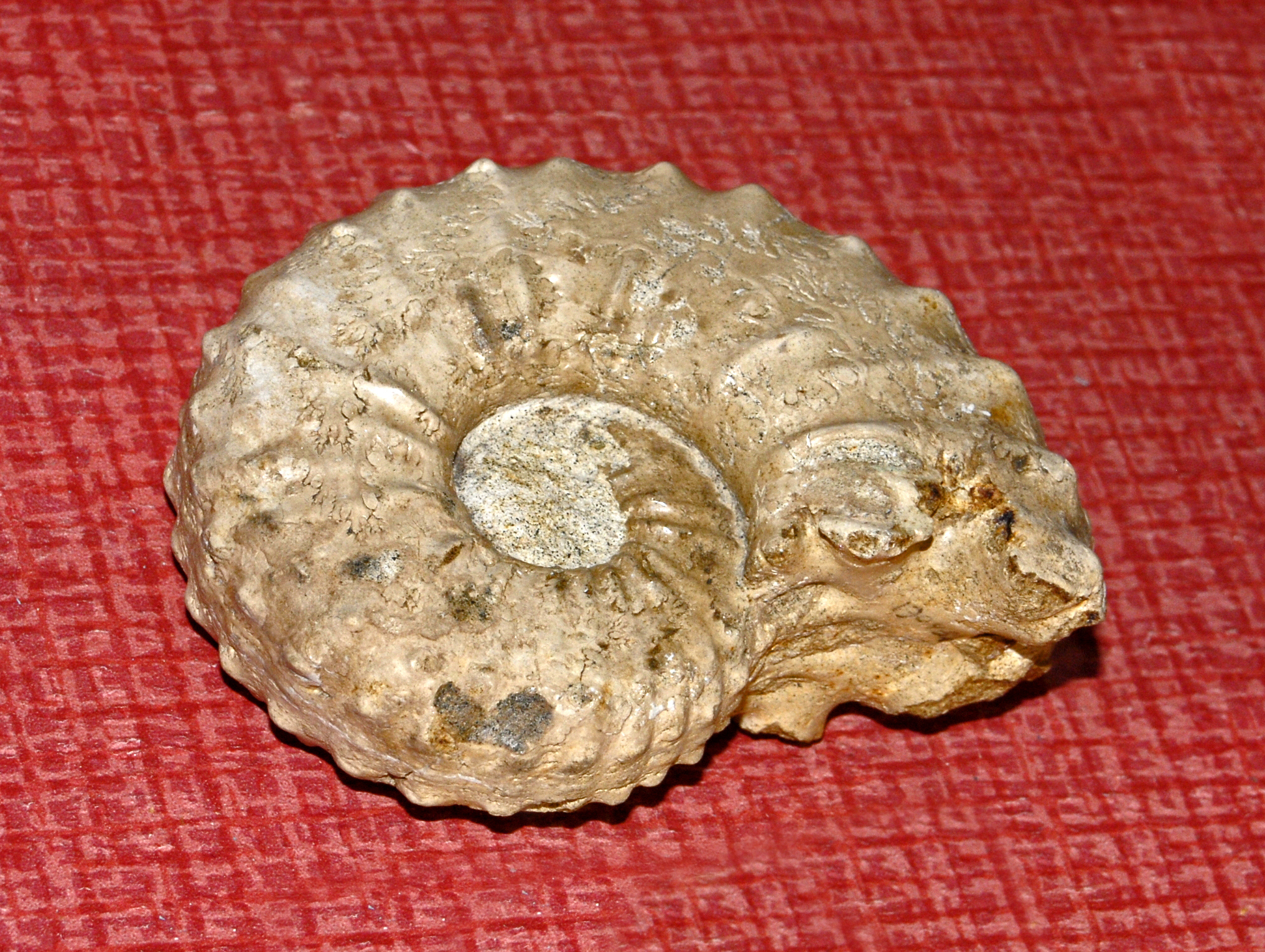
- Fossil of A. rhotomagensis from France, on display at Galerie de paléontologie et d'anatomie comparée in Paris

Scientific classification
- Kingdom: Animalia
- Phylum: Mollusca
- Class: Cephalopoda
- Subclass: †Ammonoidea
- Order: †Ammonitida
- Family: †Acanthoceratidae
- Subfamily: †Acanthoceratinae
- Genus: †Acanthoceras; Neumayr, 1875

Species
- See text

= Acanthoceras (ammonite) =

Acanthoceras Temporal range: Albian-Coniacian ~109.0–89.3 Ma

Genus of molluscs (fossil)

Acanthoceras is an extinct cephalopod genus belonging to the subclass Ammonoidea and family Acanthoceratidae that lived from the Albian to early Coniacian stages of the Cretaceous.

== Description ==
Their shells had ornate ribs whose function is unknown, although some scientists have speculated that these ribs helped strengthen the animals' shells to allow them to live at greater depths where the water pressure is higher. An adult had a shell diameter of approximately 100 centimetres (39 in).

== Species ==
- A. athabascense Warren and Stelck, 1955
- A. chasca Benavides-Caceres, 1956
- A. compitalis Stoyanow, 1949
- A. folleatum White, 1887
- A. joserita Stoyanow, 1949
- A. jukesbrownei Spath, 1926
- A. offarcinatum White, 1887
- A. pollocense Benavides-Caceres, 1956
- A. rhotomagensis (Brongniart, 1822)
- A. sangalense Benavides-Caceres, 1956
- A. seitzi Riedel, 1932
- A. wintoni Adkins, 1928

== Distribution ==
Acanthoceras fossils have been found in Australia, Brazil, Bulgaria, Colombia (Hondita Formation, Prado, Tolima), Denmark, Egypt, Morocco, France, Germany, India (Gujarat)

, Iran, Madagascar, Mexico, Mozambique, Nigeria, Papua New Guinea, Peru, the United Kingdom, United States (California, Minnesota, New Mexico, Texas), and Venezuela.
