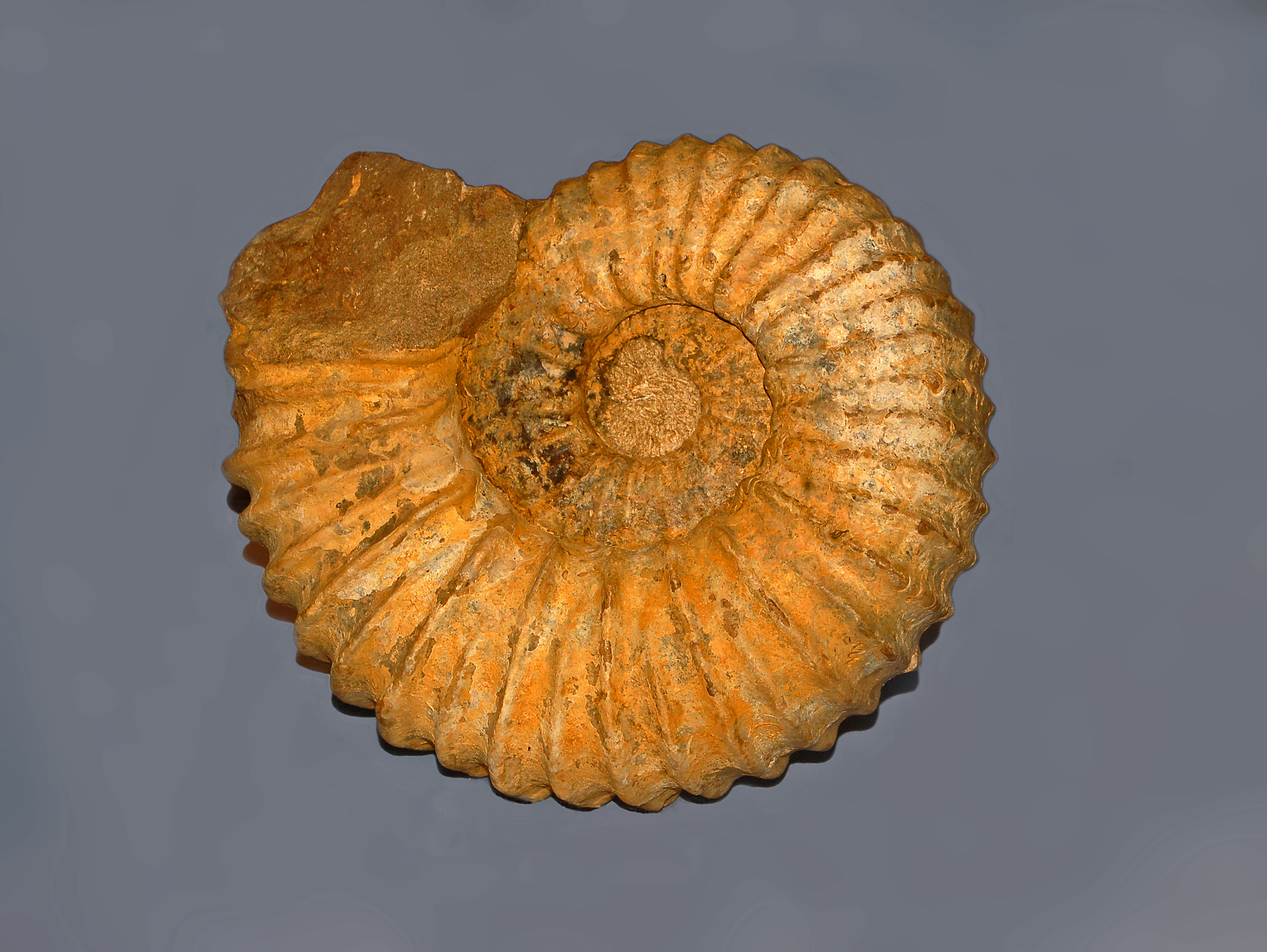
- Mantelliceras tuberculatum

Scientific classification
- Kingdom: Animalia
- Phylum: Mollusca
- Class: Cephalopoda
- Subclass: †Ammonoidea
- Order: †Ammonitida
- Superfamily: †Acanthoceratoidea
- Family: †Acanthoceratidae; Grossouvre, 1894

Subfamilies
- See text

Synonyms
- Buchiceratidae Hyatt, 1903; Metoicoceratidae Hyatt, 1903

= Acanthoceratidae =

Family of molluscs (fossil)

Acanthoceratidae is an extinct family of acanthoceratoid cephalopods in the order Ammonitida, known from the Upper Cretaceous. The type genus is Acanthoceras.

== Diagnosis ==
Acanthoceratidae species are strongly tuberculate with at least umbilical and ventrolateral tubercles in most genera included. Ribs are dominant in some, in others weak or absent on the outer whorls. Most are evolute, compressed to very depressed in section. Sutures are ammonitic with little variation, but showing a tendency for simplication in later genera.

== Taxonomy ==
Acanthoceratidae de Grossouvre, 1894 includes the following subfamilies.

- Acanthoceratinae de Groussouvre, 1894
- Euomphaloceratinae Cooper, 1978
- Mammitinae (Hyatt, 1900) (= Fallotitinae Wiedmann, 1960; Mitoniainae Renz & Alvarez, 1979)
- Mantelliceratinae Hyatt, 1903
