= Ashizawa Formation =

Geologic formation in Japan

- Stratigraphic range: Coniacian
- Type: Geological formation
- Unit of: Futaba Group
- Sub-units: Asamigawa Member, Obisagawa Member
- Underlies: Kasamatsu Formation
- Overlies: Early Cretaceous Granite, Permian shale and sandstone

Location
- Region: northern Honshu
- Country: Japan

The Ashizawa Formation is a Coniacian geologic formation in northeastern Honshu, Japan. Dinosaur remains are among the fossils that have been recovered from the formation, although none have yet been referred to a specific genus. A jawbone belonging to a therian mammal has also been discovered from this unit.

== Fossil content ==
The following fossils were reported from the formation:

Color key: Taxon / Reclassified taxon / Taxon falsely reported as present / Dubious taxon or junior synonym / Ichnotaxon / Ootaxon / Morphotaxon	Notes; Uncertain or tentative taxa are in small text; ~~crossed out~~ taxa are discredited.

=== Dinosaurs ===
==== Ornithischians ====
Ornithischians of the Ashizawa Formation
Genus	Species	Location	Stratigraphic position	Material	Notes	Image
Hadrosauroidea Indet.	Indeterminate	Fukushima Prefecture, Honshu, Japan	Coniacian		A hadrosauroid ornithopod	
Styracosterna indet.	Indeterminate	Fukushima Prefecture, Honshu, Japan	Coniacian		A styracosternan iguanodonian	

==== Theropods ====
Theropos of the Ashizawa Formation
Genus	Species	Location	Stratigraphic position	Material	Notes	Image
Theropoda indet.	Indeterminate	Fukushima Perfecture, Honshu, Japan	Coniacian	Tibia	An indeterminate theropod; informally known as "Futabasaurus".	

=== Mammals ===
Mammals of the Ashizawa Formation
Genus	Species	Location	Stratigraphic position	Material	Notes	Image
Theria indet.	Indeterminate	Fukushima Perfecure, Honshu, Japan	Coniacian		An indeteminate therian.	

=== Fish ===
Fishes of the Ashizawa Formation
Genus	Species	Location	Stratigraphic position	Material	Notes	Image
Squalus	S. sp.	Fukushima Perfecture, Honshu, Japan	Coniacian		An spurdog	

=== Mollusks ===
==== Bivalves ====
Bivalves of the Ashizawa Formation
Genus	Species	Location	Stratigraphic position	Material	Notes	Image
Inoceramus	I. uwajimensis	Fukushima Prefecture, Honshu, Japan	Coniacian		A inoceramid bivalve	

==== Cephalopods ====
Cephalopods of the Ashizawa Formation
Genus	Species	Location	Stratigraphic position	Material	Notes	Image
Anagaudryceras	A. limatum	Fukushima Prefecture, Honshu, Japan	Coniacian		A gaudryceratid lytoceratine	
Eubostrychoceras	E. indopacificum	Fukushima Prefecture, Honshu, Japan	Coniacian		A nostoceratid turrilitoid	
Forresteria	F. alluaudi	Fukushima Prefecture, Honshu, Japan	Coniacian		A barroisiceratine collignoniceratid	
Gaudryceras	G. denseplicatum	Fukushima Prefecture, Honshu, Japan	Coniacian		A gaudryceratid lytoceratine	
Pseudoxybeloceras	P. sp.	Fukushima Prefecture, Honshu, Japan	Coniacian		A diplomoceratid ammonite	
Tongoboryceras	T. kawashitai	Fukushima Prefecture, Honshu, Japan	Coniacian		A pachydiscid desmoceratoid	
Yabeiceras	Y. orientale	Fukushima Prefecture, Honshu, Japan	Coniacian		A barroisiceratine collignoniceratid	
Yezoceras	Y. elegans	Fukushima Prefecture, Honshu, Japan	Coniacian		A nostoceratid turrilitoid	
Yezoceras	Y. miotuberculatum	Fukushima Prefecture, Honshu, Japan	Coniacian		A nostoceratid turrilitoid	
Yezoites	Y. pseudoaequalis	Fukushima Prefecture, Honshu, Japan	Coniacian		A otoscaphitine scaphitid	

== See also ==
- List of dinosaur-bearing rock formations
  - List of stratigraphic units with indeterminate dinosaur fossils
