= Mexcala Formation =

Geologic formation in Guererro, Mexico

- Stratigraphic range: late Turonian-late Maastrichtian; ~90–66 Ma
- Type: Geological formation

Lithology
- Primary: Limestone, sandstone
- Other: Marl, shale

Location
- Coordinates: 18.0°N 99.2°W
- Approximate paleocoordinates: 20.5°N 71.4°W
- Region: Guerrero state
- Country: Mexico

Type section
- Named for: Mexcala
- Mexcala Formation (Mexico)

The Mexcala Formation is a Late Cretaceous (late Turonian to late Maastrichtian) geologic formation in Guerrero state, southern Mexico.

== Fossil content ==
Fossil ornithopod tracks assigned to Hadrosauridae indet. and sauropod tracks have been reported from the formation.

Other fossils from the formation include:

=== Ammonites ===
- Barroisiceras (Texanites) dentatocarinatum
- Coilopoceras colleti
- C. requienianum
- Forresteria (Forresteria) alluaudi
- Peroniceras aff. tricarinatum
- P. cf. subtricarinatum
- Pseudotissotia galliennei
- Barroisiceras cf. alstadenense
- Barroisiceras sp.
- Peroniceras sp.

=== Fish ===
- Buapichthys gracilis

== See also ==
- List of fossiliferous stratigraphic units in Mexico
- List of dinosaur-bearing rock formations
  - List of stratigraphic units with ornithischian tracks
  - Ornithopod tracks
- Mesozoic Mexico-related topics
