= Cibolaites =

Cibolaites Temporal range: Turonian

Scientific classification
- Kingdom: Animalia
- Phylum: Mollusca
- Class: Cephalopoda
- Subclass: †Ammonoidea
- Order: †Ammonitida
- Family: †Collignoniceratidae
- Subfamily: †Collignoniceratinae
- Genus: †Cibolaites; Cobban & Hook, 1983

Genus of molluscs (fossil)

The genus Cibolaites is a strongly ribbed and nodose ammonoid cephalopod from the middle Cretaceous of western New Mexico, included in the taxonomic family Collignoniceratidae. A single species Cibolaites molenaari is known.

== Description ==
Cibolaites is a moderate-sized, somewhat involute genus, with a moderate umbilicus, that bears broad rounded ribs on the flanks which bifurcate from the umbilical shoulder on larger specimens. Whorl section is broadest though the umbilical shoulders, flanks converge moderately on a broadly rounded venter. which bears three rows of distinct, commonly elongate, nodes. (Plate 2, figs 1–9, Cobban and Hook, 1983). The suture is ammonitic but relatively simple with generally rounded, cauliform, elements. (Fig 14, p. 17, Cobban and Hook, 1983). Cibolaites is similar to the Coniacian Barroisiceras which differ in having smaller umbilici and crenulate keels.

== History and classification ==
Cibolaites was discovered in lower Turonian sediments in the Fence Lake area south of Gallop in western New Mexico associated with Neoptychites and Fagesia. The type and only species is Cibolaites molenaari, named by Cobban and Hook in 1983. The genus name is in reference to Cibola County, New Mexico. The species is named for C. M. Molinaar who investigated mid-Cretaceous stratigraphy in northwest New Mexico and discovered the Fence Lake Fauna. No other species have been identified. When first described, Cibolites was placed in the Barroisiceratinae, a subfamily within the Collignoniceratidae, but subsequently moved to the subfamily Collignoniceratinae.

The holotype and paratypes are deposited in the National Museum of Natural History. Additional specimens identified as such are in the collections of the New Mexico Museum of Natural History and Science in Albuquerque, New Mexico.
