= Bevahites =

Bevahites Temporal range: Santonian–Campanian

Scientific classification
- Kingdom: Animalia
- Phylum: Mollusca
- Class: Cephalopoda
- Subclass: †Ammonoidea
- Order: †Ammonitida
- Family: †Collignoniceratidae
- Subfamily: †Texanitinae
- Genus: †Bevahites; Collignon, 1948

Species
- None cataloged

Bevahites is a Cretaceous ammonite with an evolute, ribbed, tuberculate, and keeled shell with a squarish to compressed whorl section.

Bevahites is a member of the collignoniceratid subfamily Texanitinae as well as of the Acanthoceratoidea and has been found in Upper Santonian to middle Campanian sediments in southern Africa and Madagascar.

Barrisioceras, Menabites, and Parabevahites are among related genera.
