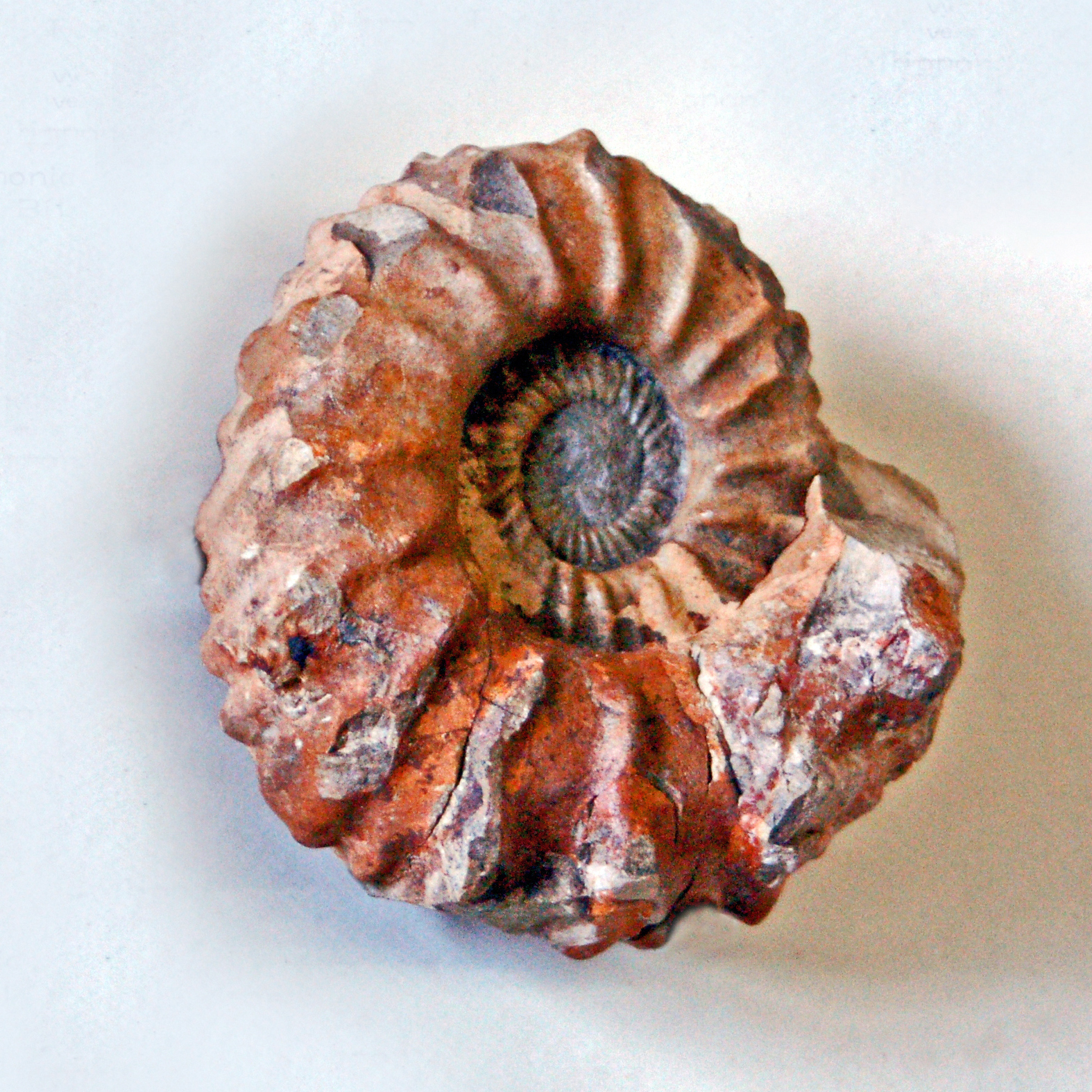
- Collignoniceras woolgari, from Bílá Hora, Prague, Czech Republic, at the National Museum (Prague)

Scientific classification
- Kingdom: Animalia
- Phylum: Mollusca
- Class: Cephalopoda
- Subclass: †Ammonoidea
- Order: †Ammonitida
- Family: †Collignoniceratidae
- Subfamily: †Collignoniceratinae
- Genus: †Collignoniceras; Breistroffer, 1947

Species
- See text

= Collignoniceras =

Collignoniceras Temporal range: Turonian

Genus of molluscs (fossil)

Collignociceras is a strongly ribbed and tuberculate, evolute ammonite from the Turonian of the western U.S. and Europe belonging to the ammonitid family Collignoniceratidae. The genus is named after the French paleontologist Maurice Collignon. The type is Collignoniceras woollgari, named by Mantell in 1822 for specimens from Sussex, England.

The shell is compressed in early growth stages, with rounded or high and clavate siphonal tubercles tending to form a serrate keel, straight or slightly sinuous ribs and weak umbilical and strong ventrolateral tubercles. later whorls tend to be squarer in section with exaggerated ventrolateral tubercles.

Two subspecies are known from the Turonian of western North America, C. woollgari wooolgari and C. woollgari regulari. C. w. woollgari has been found with Mammites depressus at the top of the lower shale tongue and lowermost overlying Tres Hermanos sandstone member of the Mancos Shale in New Mexico, in a shale bed at the top of the Greenhorn Formation in Colorado, and alone in sandstone and shale in the upper Frontier Formation in Wyoming. The slightly younger C. w. regulari is known from the lower Carlile Shale, which overlies the Greenhorn. It has been found in U. S. western interior from as far west as northern Arizona and eastern Utah and from New Mexico to Montana.
