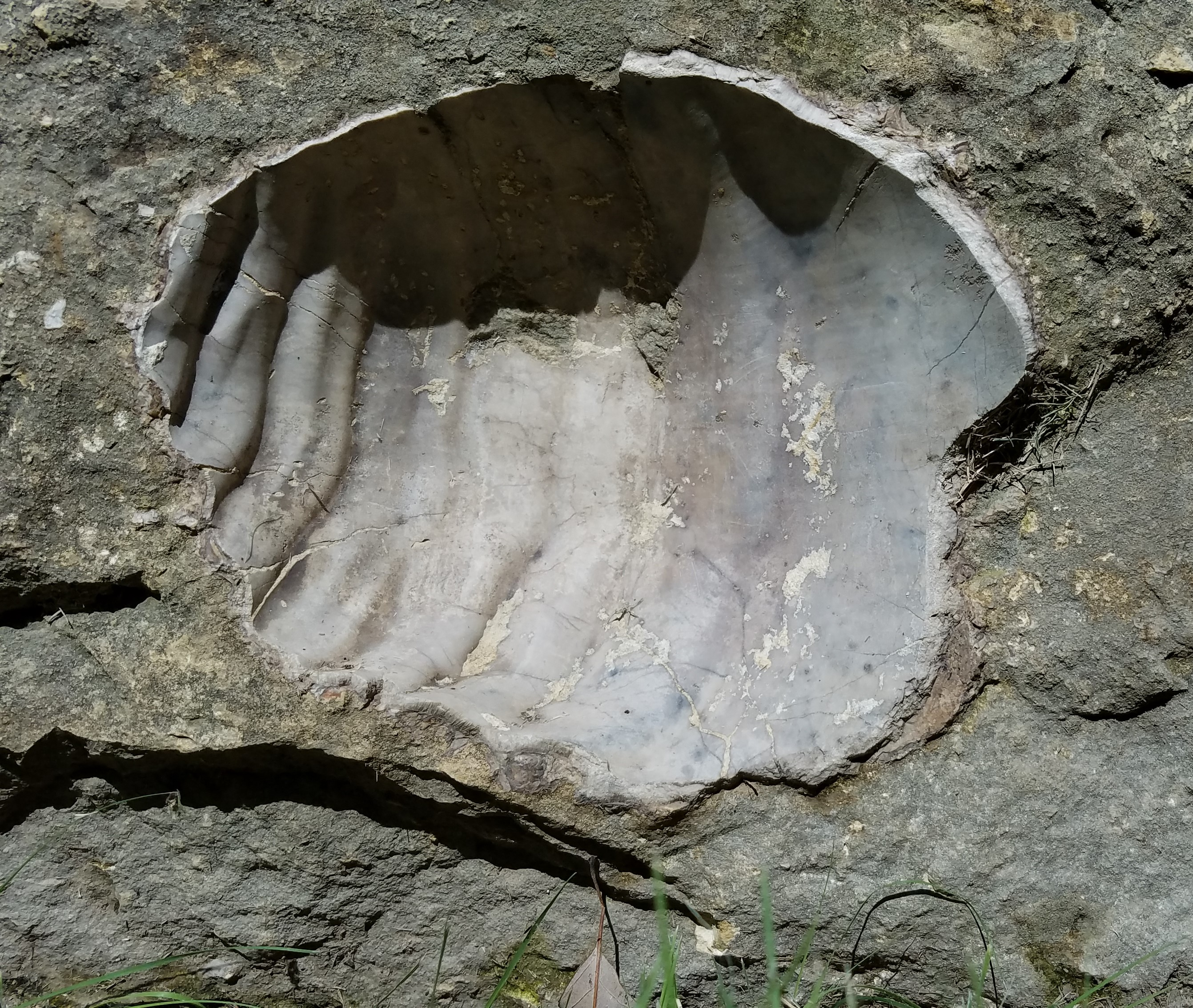
- Cremnoceramus deformis in early Turonian Fort Hays limestone, showing characteristic wavy rugae.

Scientific classification
- Domain: Eukaryota
- Kingdom: Animalia
- Phylum: Mollusca
- Class: Bivalvia
- Order: Pteriida
- Family: †Inoceramidae
- Genus: †Cremnoceramus; Cox, 1969 (posthumous)

Species
- C. crassus; C. deformis Meek 1871; C. inconstans; C. rotundatus Fiege 1930; C. waltersdorfensis

= Cremnoceramus =

Cremnoceramus Temporal range: Turonian-Maastrichtian ~94–66 Ma

Extinct genus of bivalves

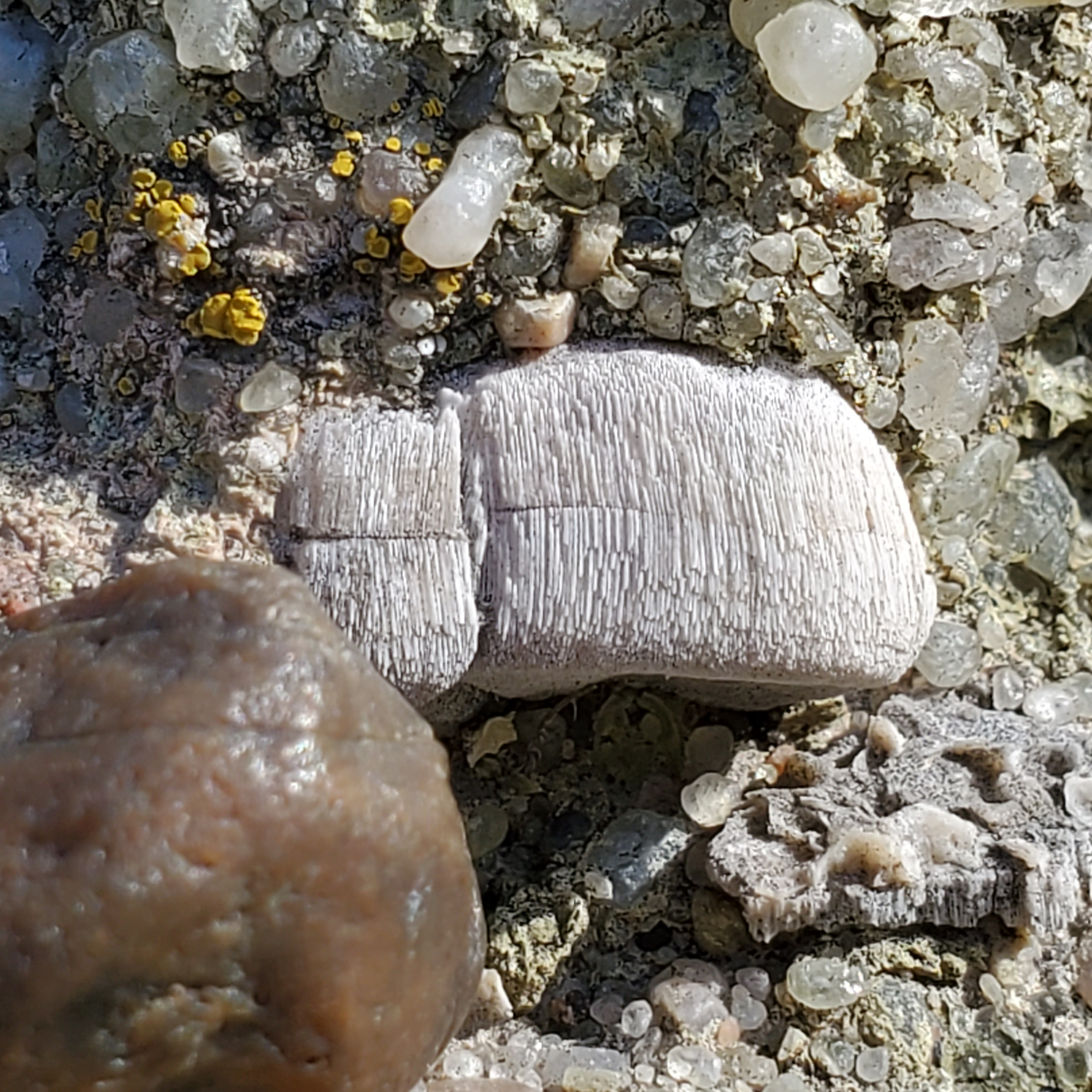
Weathered Cremnoceramus deformis shell fragment highlighting the orientation and texture of the calcite prisms definitive of thick-shelled Cremnoceramus and Inocermidae in general

Cremnoceramus ("cremno-" = kremnos [Greek]: precipice or over hanging wall or bank; "ceramus" = keramos [Greek]: clay pot) is an extinct genus of fossil marine pteriomorphian bivalves that superficially resembled the related winged pearly oysters of the extant genus Pteria. They lived from the Turonian to the Maastrichtian of the Late Cretaceous.

== Description ==
Cremnoceramus were facultatively mobile, blind, suspension feeding bivalves with low-magnesium calcite shells. Inoceramids, like the Cremnoceramus in particular, had thick shells composed of particular "prisms" of calcite deposited perpendicular to the surface, and unweathered fossils commonly preserve the mother-of-pearl luster the shells had in life. Compared to the many examples of broad and flattened Inoceramidae, Cremnoceramus shells are rather "high-walled", deep bowl-shaped. The top shell is commonly encrusted with oysters.

== Species ==
The following species are recognized:

- C. crassus
- C. deformis
- C. inconstans
- C. rotundatus
- C. waltersdorfensis

== Biostratigraphic significance ==
The first appearance of the species Cremnoceramus rotundatus marks the beginning of the Coniacian stage.

== Distribution ==
Fossils of the genus have been found in:

- Gosau Formation, Austria
- Cotinguiba Formation, Brazil
- Pointe-Noire, Congo-Brazzaville
- Jicin, the Czech Republic
- Arnager Limestone Formation, Denmark
- Craie de Villedieu Formation, France
- Germany
- Anaipadi Formation, India
- Tongobury, Madagascar
- Austin Group, Mexico
- Sant Corneli and El Zadorra Formation, Spain
- Lewes Nodular Chalk Formation, the United Kingdom
- Niobrara Formation, New Mexico, United States

== Gallery ==
Note the oyster encrustation of the top shells:

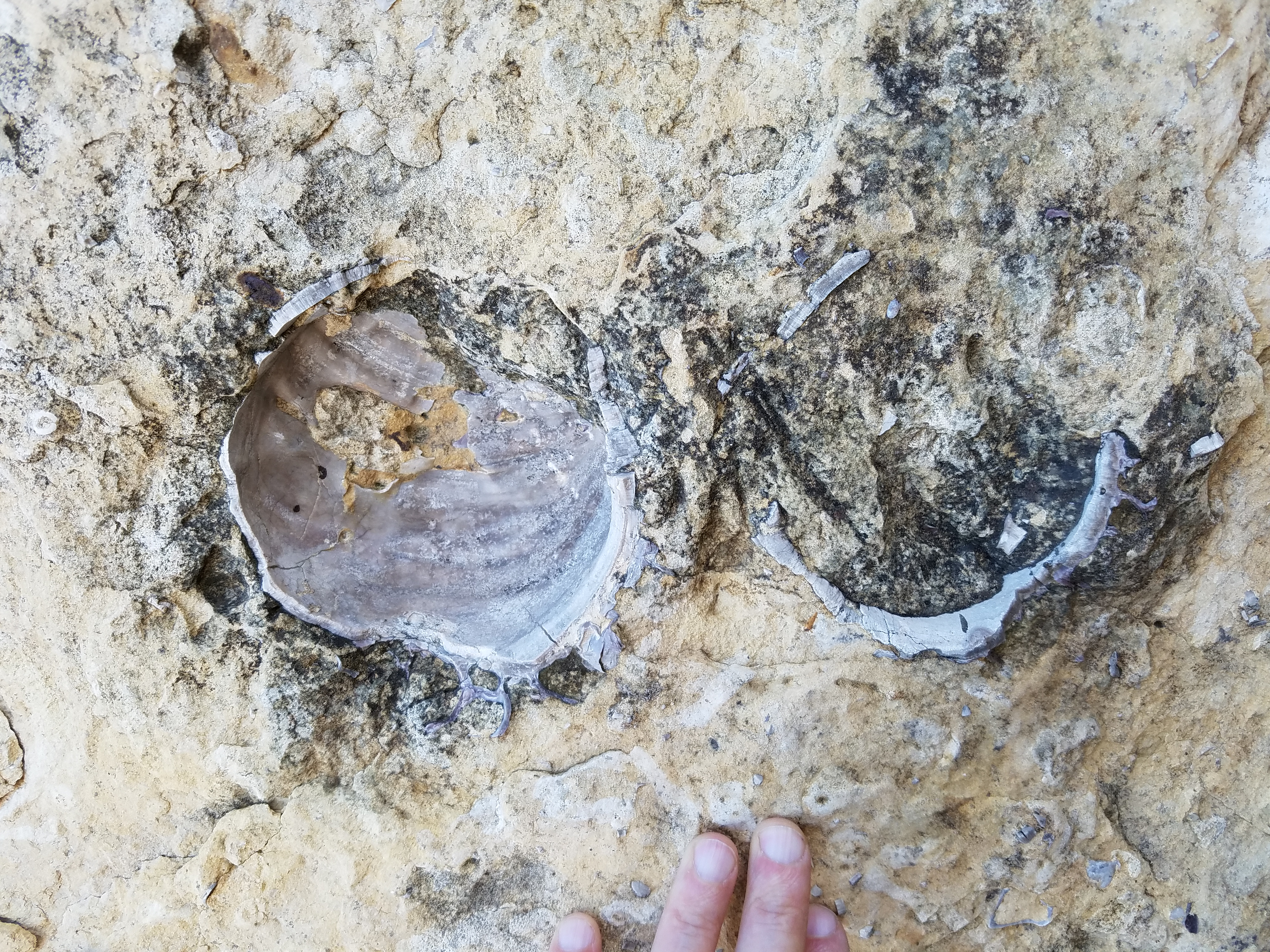
Horizontal section of articulated C. deformis (Fort Hays ls.)

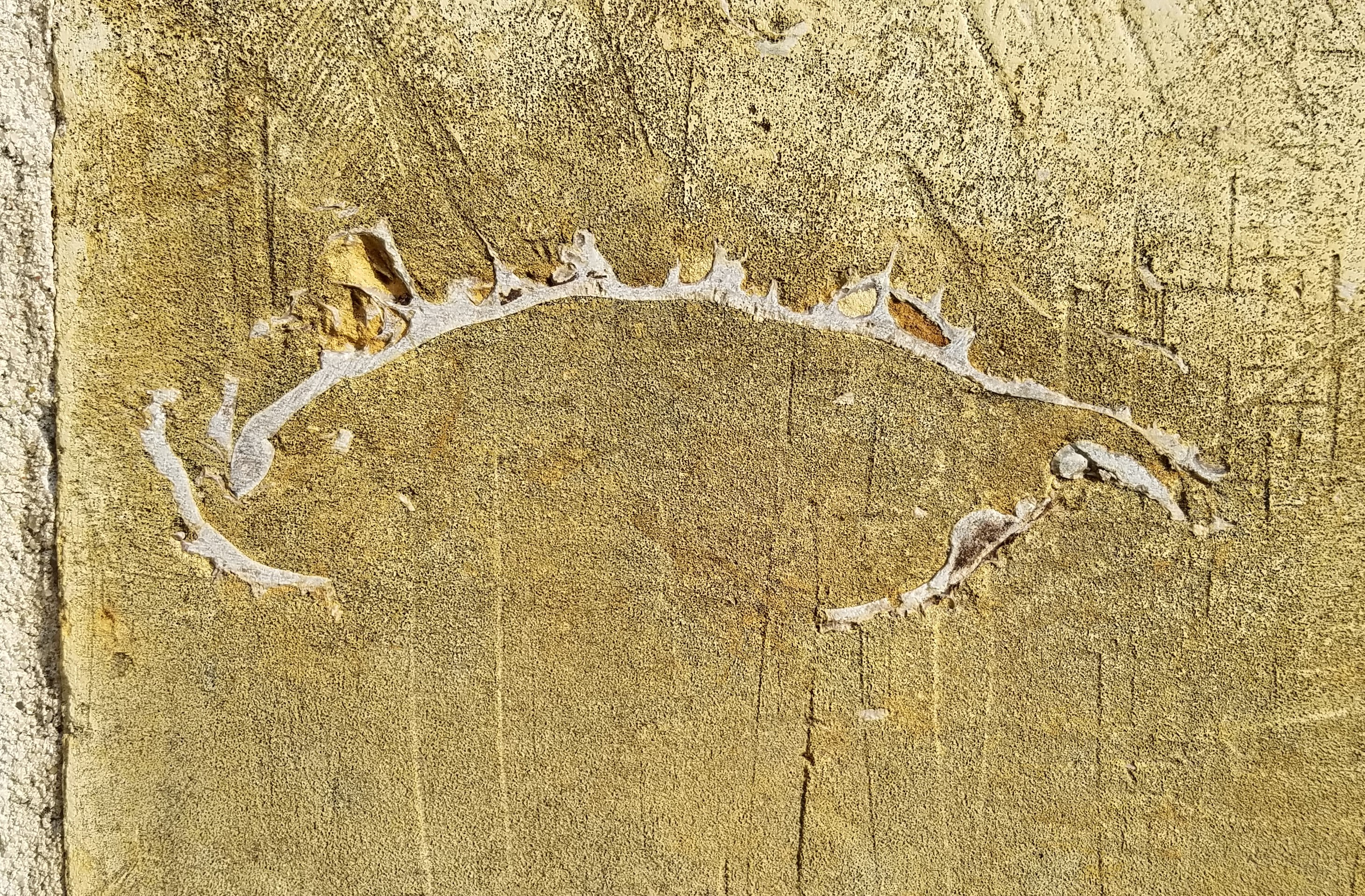
Lateral section of articulated C. deformis (Fort Hays ls.)

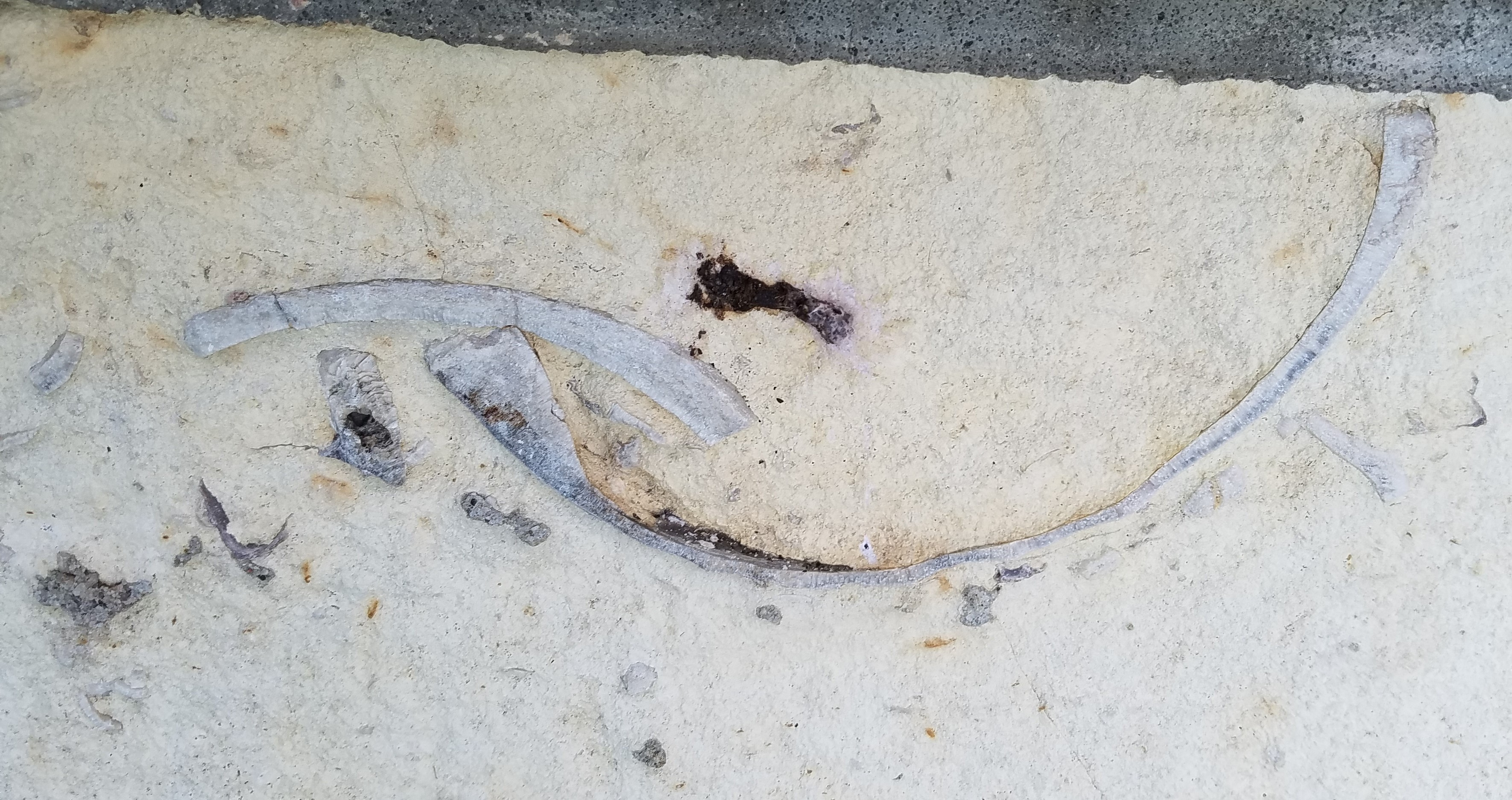
Lateral section of articulated C. deformis (Fort Hays ls.)

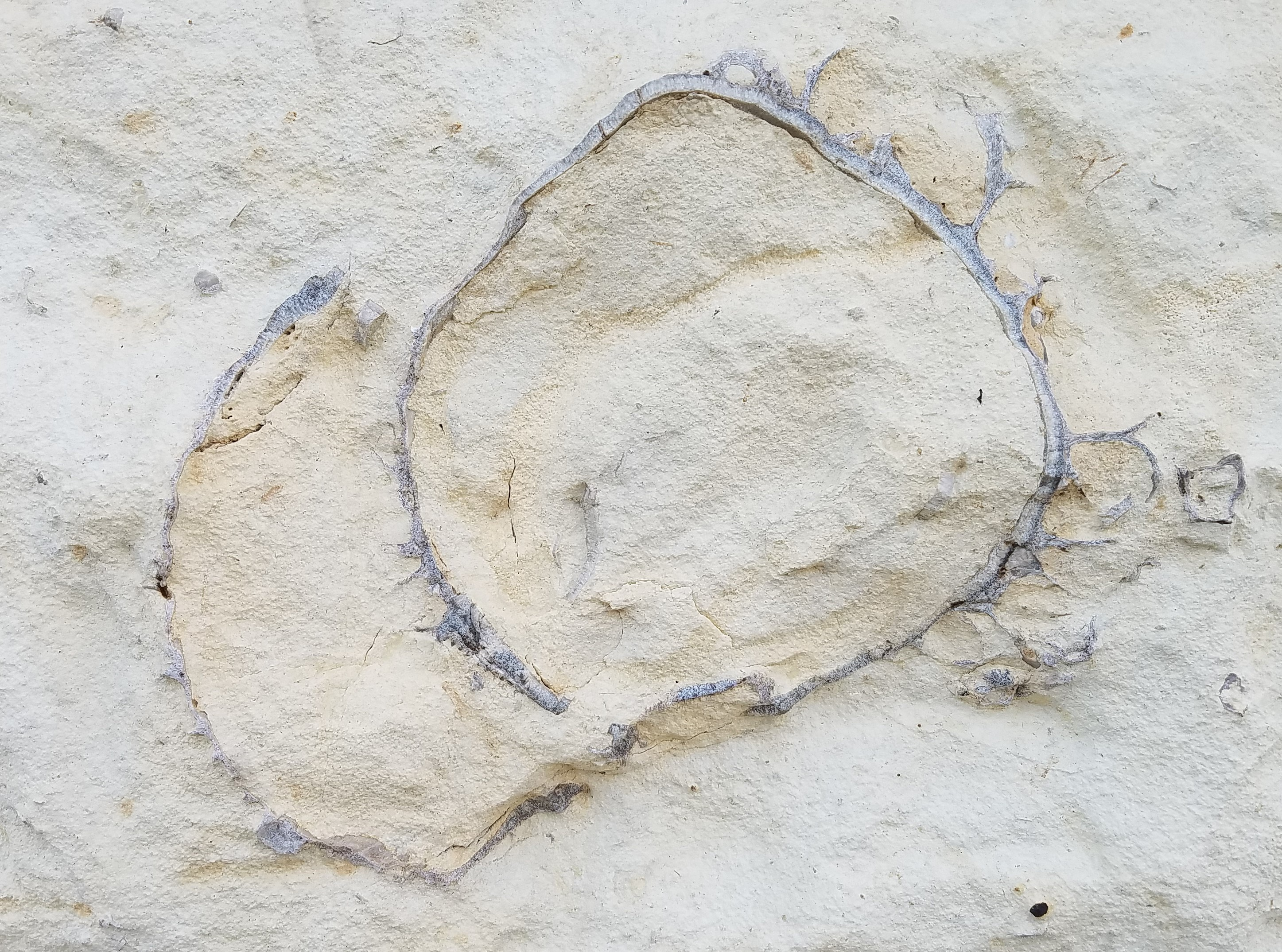
Horizontal section of articulated C. deformis (Fort Hays ls.)
