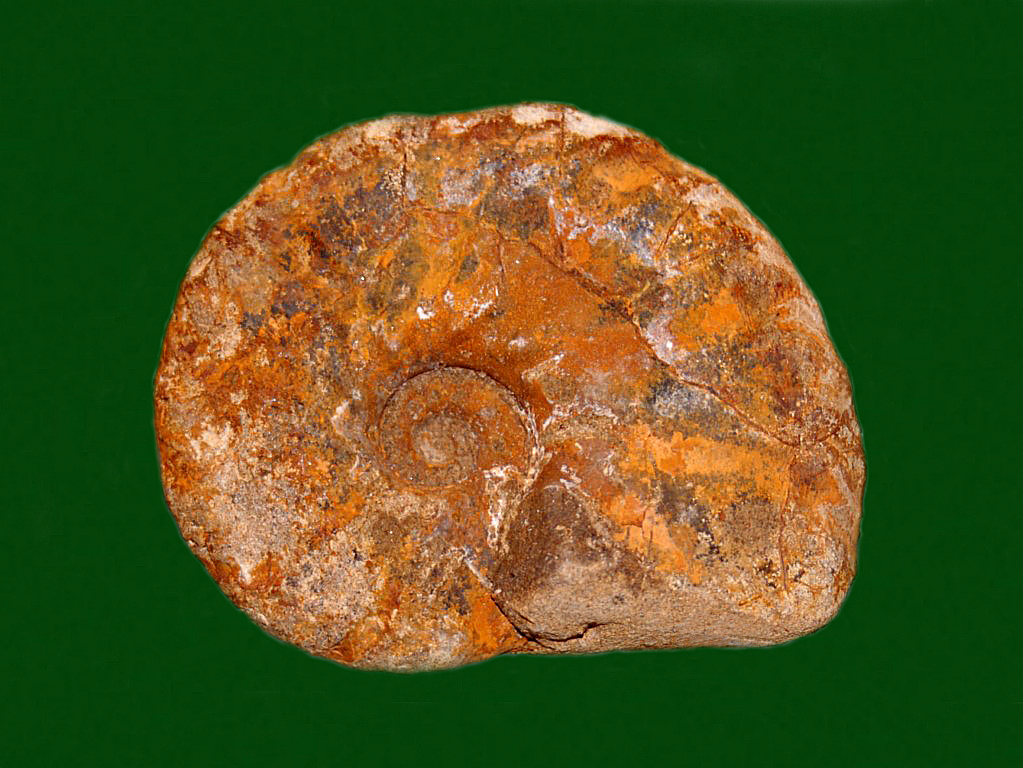
- Fossil of Forresteria species. Coniacian of Madagascar

Scientific classification
- Kingdom: Animalia
- Phylum: Mollusca
- Class: Cephalopoda
- Subclass: †Ammonoidea
- Order: †Ammonitida
- Family: †Collignoniceratidae
- Subfamily: †Barroisiceratinae
- Genus: †Forresteria; Reeside, 1932

Species
- See text

= Forresteria =

Forresteria Temporal range: Turonian - Santonian

Genus of molluscs (fossil)

Forresteria is an extinct genus of cephalopod belonging to the subclass Ammonoidea. They flourished during the late Turonian and early Santonian of the Late Cretaceous, and were global in extent. Forresteria alluaudi and Forresteria hobsoni are considered marker fossils for the lower Coniacian in the American West.

== Description ==
Although the whorl section and ornament of Forresteria are variable, it is easily distinguished from Barroisiceras by the presence of mid-lateral tubercles on the inner whorls, which later disappear or fuse with either umbilical or ventrolateral tubercles. Four subgenera are recognized

- F. (Forresteria): Whorl section moderately to very inflated. Mid-lateral tubercles fuse with ventrolateral.
- F. (Reesideoceras): Whorl section less inflated than with F. (Forresteria). Mid-lateral tubercles fuse with the umbilical. Keel disappears on outer whorl leaving venter flat or concave, bordered by ventrolateral clavi.
- F. (Harleites): Shell compressed, with high keel and steep umbilical wall. Early whorls have weak umbilical, strong mid-lateral, and fine, feeble ventrolateral tubercles.
- F. (Zumpangoceras): Inclusion doubtful. Known only from crushed specimens from Mexico. Mid lateral tubercle strengthens with age.

=== Species ===
species in Forresteria include:

- Forresteria alluaudi (Boule, Lemoine and Thévenin, 1907)
- Forresteria brancoi
- Forresteria hobsoni
- Forresteria neo-mexica
- Forresteria petrocoriensis (Coquand, 1859)
- Forresteria peruana
- Forresteria seidli (Summesberger H. and Kennedy W.J., Vienna, May 2022 "New results from the Coniacian and Santonian of the Gosau group" (Austria, Abh. Geol. B.A. Band 75, S. 5-13))

Forresteria was named for Robert Forrester of Salt Lake City, Utah.
