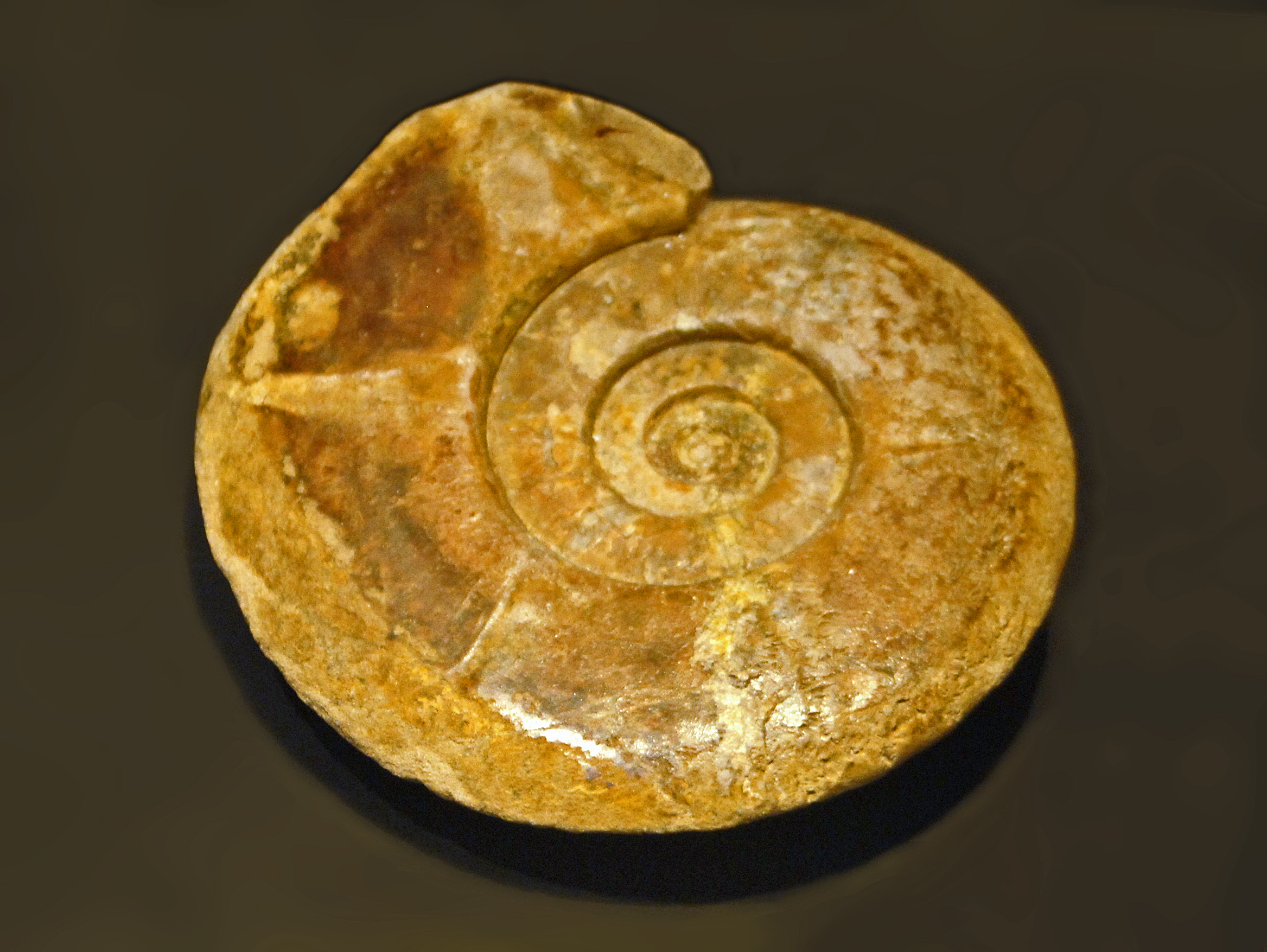
- Hauericeras gardeni from Madagascar

Scientific classification
- Kingdom: Animalia
- Phylum: Mollusca
- Class: Cephalopoda
- Subclass: †Ammonoidea
- Order: †Ammonitida
- Family: †Desmoceratidae
- Subfamily: †Hauericeratinae
- Genus: †Hauericeras de Grossouvre, 1894

= Hauericeras =

Hauericeras Temporal range: Coniacian–Maastrichtian

Genus of molluscs (fossil)

Hauericeras is an ammonite genus from the Late Cretaceous that lived from the Coniacian to the late Maastrichtian, from about 90 to 66 mya. Fossils have been found in Europe, Russia, South Africa, Australia, India, Iraq, and in the United States.

The shell of Haericeras is subinvolute with the outer whorl covering much of the inner, but leaving part of the inner whorls exposed. Whorls are smooth with narrow periodic constructions. Whorl section is laterally compressed, flanks gently bowed, venter sharp. The suture is strongly ammonitic.

The genus Oiophyllites may be related.

== Species ==
- Hauericeras gardeni
- Hauericeras pseudogardeni
- Hauericeras sulcatum
