= Maurice Collignon =

French geologist and paleontologist

- Born: Maurice Jules Marie Collignon; 9 June 1893; Saint-Malo, France
- Died: 21 October 1978 (aged 85); Moirans, france
- Education: military academy at Saint-Cyr
- Occupations: geologist, paleontologist
- Known for: research of Cretaceous period ammonites from Madagascar
- Notable work: ammonite family Collignoniceratidae

Maurice Jules Marie Collignon (9 June 1893, Saint-Malo – 21 October 1978, Moirans) was a French geologist and paleontologist, who is best known for his research of Cretaceous period ammonites from Madagascar.

A career military officer, in 1914 he received his diploma from the military academy at Saint-Cyr, then spent the next 36 years associated with the French armed services. In the meantime he conducted geological and paleontological research; as early as 1928 he was providing descriptions of ammonite fauna from Madagascar. In 1950 he retired from military service with the rank of major general. He then joined the Service géologique d'outre-mer as a paleontologist, and afterwards directed four 6-month missions of paleontological exploration in Madagascar (1952, 1953, 1954, 1957).

From 1959 to 1978 he was a correspondent member of the Académie des sciences. During his career, he described numerous fossil taxa, such as the ammonite genus Cunningtoniceras. The ammonite family Collignoniceratidae commemorates his name.

== Principal works ==
- Ammonites néocrétacées du Ménabe (Madagascar), 6 volumes, 1948-56 – Neo-Cretaceous ammonites of Menabe.
- Recherches sur les faunes albiennes de Madagascar, 5 volumes, 1949-51 – Research of Albian fauna of Madagascar.
- Atlas des fossiles caractéristiques de Madagascar, (multi-volume, 1958 ff.) – Atlas of characteristic fossils of Madagascar.
