= Cunningtoniceras =

Cunningtoniceras Temporal range: Late Cretaceous (latest Cenomanian)

Scientific classification
- Kingdom: Animalia
- Phylum: Mollusca
- Class: Cephalopoda
- Subclass: †Ammonoidea
- Order: †Ammonitida
- Family: †Acanthoceratidae
- Subfamily: †Acanthoceratinae
- Genus: †Cunningtoniceras; Collignon, 1927

Species
- See text

Genus of molluscs (fossil)

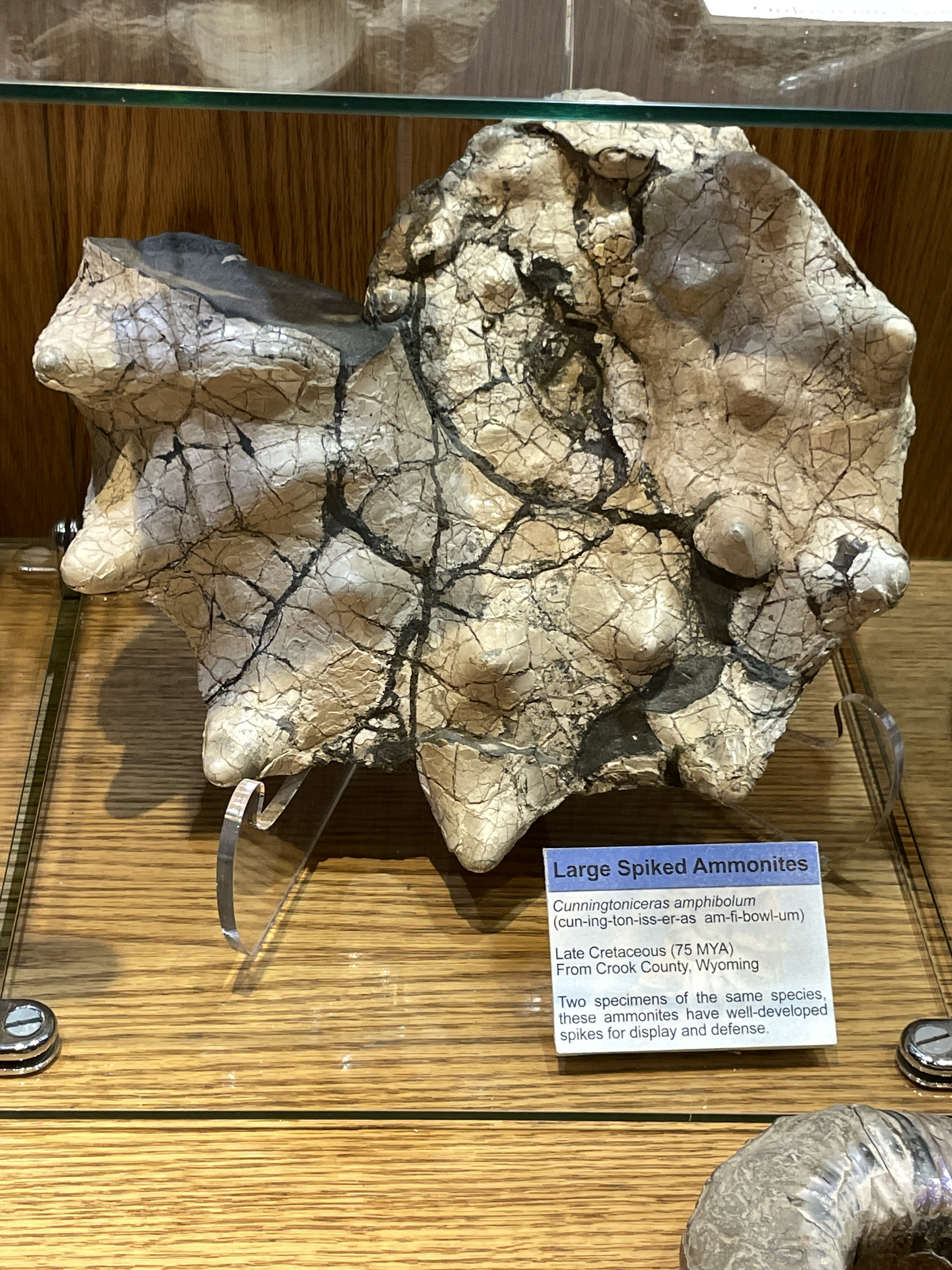
Specimen of Cunningtoniceras amphibolum, on display at the Wyoming Dinosaur Center

Cunningtoniceras is a stocky acanthoceratid ammonite from the upper Cenomanian stage of the late Cretaceous of the western U.S., found e.g. in Arizona and New Mexico.

Cunningtoniceras was proposed by Maurice Collignon, 1927, for ribbed, evolute ammonites having a quadrangular whorl section; umbilical, inner and outer ventrolateral, and siphonal (i.e. mid-ventral) tubercles; a venter with a multiplication of ribs and tubercles, or one or the other. Ornament weakens with age except for the inner ventrolateral tubercles, which enlargen.

Cobban, Hook & Kennedy, 1989, distinguish Cunningtoniceras Collignon from Euomphaloceras Spath 1923, the two having been previously regarded as synonymous. In fact Cunningtoniceras is described in the Treatise L, 1957 as a synonym of Euomphaloceras, noted as having three rows of small tubercles on a broad flat venter.

Although Cunningtonicaras and Euomphaloceras share many characters, both belonging to the Acanthoceratidae, they are distinguished by the nature of the first lateral lobe of their respective sutures. The first lateral lobe of species ultimately assigned to Cunningtonicaras are narrow and bifid, contrasting with the broad and deeply bifid lobes of Euomphalooceras.
