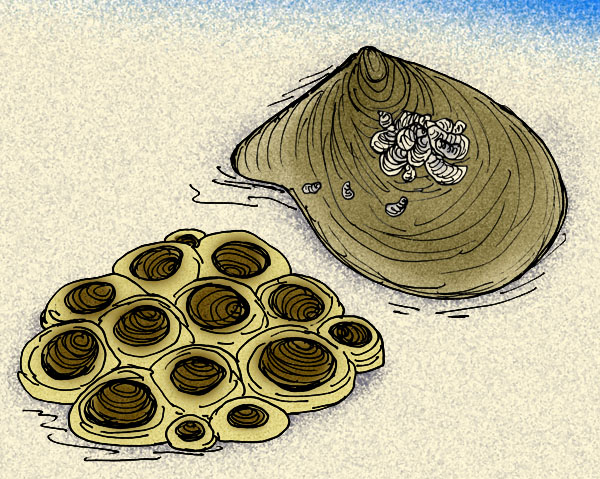
- Comparison of Volviceramus grandis (right) and Durania maxima (left)

Scientific classification
- Kingdom: Animalia
- Phylum: Mollusca
- Class: Bivalvia
- Order: Pteriida
- Family: †Inoceramidae
- Genus: †Volviceramus; Stoliczka, 1871

= Volviceramus =

Volviceramus Temporal range: Late Cretaceous

Extinct genus of bivalves

Volviceramus is an extinct genus of fossil inoceramid bivalve mollusks from the Late Cretaceous of Europe and North America.

== Species ==
Species within the genus Volviceramus include:

- Volviceramus anomalus Heine, 1929
- Volviceramus cardinalensis Walaszczyk, Plint & Landman, 2017
- Volviceramus exogyroides Meek & Hayden, 1862
- Volviceramus involutus Sowerby, 1828
- Volviceramus koeni Müller, 1887
- Volviceramus stotti Walaszczyk, Plint & Landman, 2017
