= Yabeiceras =

Yabeiceras Temporal range: Coniacian 89.3–85.8 Ma

Scientific classification
- Kingdom: Animalia
- Phylum: Mollusca
- Class: Cephalopoda
- Subclass: †Ammonoidea
- Order: †Ammonitida
- Family: †Collignoniceratidae
- Subfamily: †Barroisiceratinae
- Genus: †Yabeiceras; Tokunaga & Shimizu, 1926

Species
- See text

Genus of molluscs (fossil)

Yabeiceras is an extinct genus of cephalopods belonging to the ammonite family Collignoniceratidae. They flourished during the Coniacian age, and lived in South Africa.

== Species ==
The species in the genus Yabeiceras include:

- Y. ankinatsyense
- Y. cobbani
- Y. costatum
- Y. crassiornatum
- Y. manasoaense
- Y. orientale (type species)
- Y. transiens
