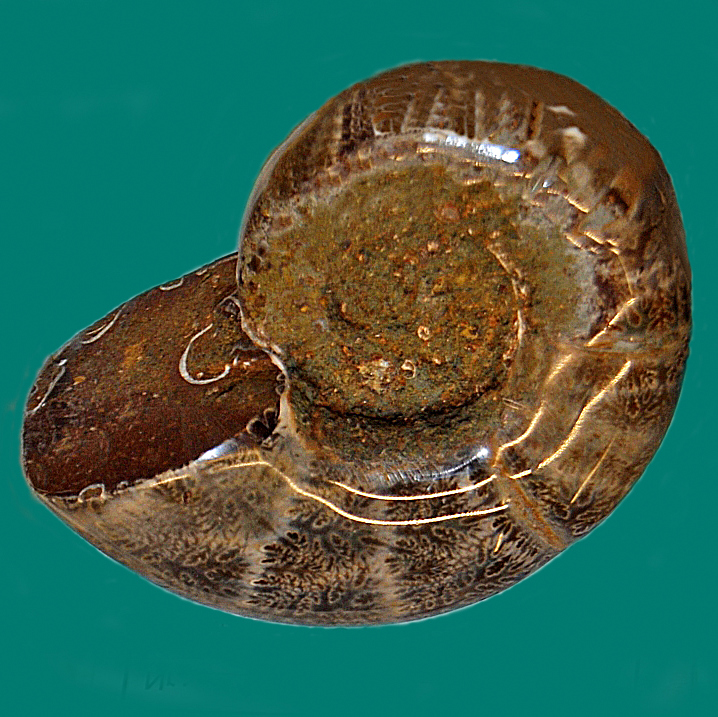
- Fossil of Eotetragonites species

Scientific classification
- Domain: Eukaryota
- Kingdom: Animalia
- Phylum: Mollusca
- Class: Cephalopoda
- Subclass: †Ammonoidea
- Order: †Ammonitida
- Family: †Gaudryceratidae
- Genus: †Eotetragonites; Breistroffer, 1947

= Eotetragonites =

Eotetragonites Temporal range: Cretaceous

Eotetragonites is an extinct genus of ammonite.

Eotetragonites is considered by some authors a subgenus of Eogaudryceras.

== Species ==
Species within this genus include:

- Eotetragonites duvali (A.V.M.D. D'Orbigny ) †
- Eotetragonites raspaili Breistroffer, 1947 †
- Eotetragonites rossmatteliformis
- Eotetragonites umbilicostriatum Collignon 1949

== Fossil record ==
The fossil record of this genus dates back to the Cretaceous (age range: from 112.6 to 99.7million years ago). Fossils of species within this genus have been found in Egypt, France, Madagascar, South Africa and United States (California). These cephalopods were fast-moving nektonic carnivores.

== See also ==
- List of ammonite genera
