= Cladoceramus =

Cladoceramus Temporal range: Late Turonian-Santonian ~89.8–83.6 Ma

Scientific classification
- Kingdom: Animalia
- Phylum: Mollusca
- Class: Bivalvia
- Order: Pteriida
- Family: †Inoceramidae
- Genus: †Cladoceramus; Seitz 1961

Species
- C. undulatoplicatus Roemer 1852

Extinct genus of bivalves

Cladoceramus is an extinct genus of fossil marine pteriomorphian bivalves that superficially resembled the related winged pearly oysters of the extant genus Pteria. They lived in the Santonian stage of the Late Cretaceous.

== Description ==
Adult shells of Cladoceramus are small to very large size (more than 1 metre [3 ft 3 in] in length). Many species with fine, discrete, juvenile ornamentation on umbo, consisting of closely and evenly to subevenly spaced raised concentric growth lines without rugae. Posterior auricle well-defined, triangular, separated from disc by auricular sulcus; a post-umbonal sulcus occurs in some species, as do very small anterior auricles ("ears").

== Biostratigraphic significance ==
The first appearance of the species Cladoceramus undulatoplicatus marks the beginning of the Santonian stage.

== Distribution ==
Fossils of the genus have been found in:

- Matulla Formation, Egypt

United States

- Forbes Shale, California
- Smoky Hill Shale, Niobrara Formation, Colorado and New Mexico
- Austin Chalk, Texas
- Mancos Shale, Wyoming
