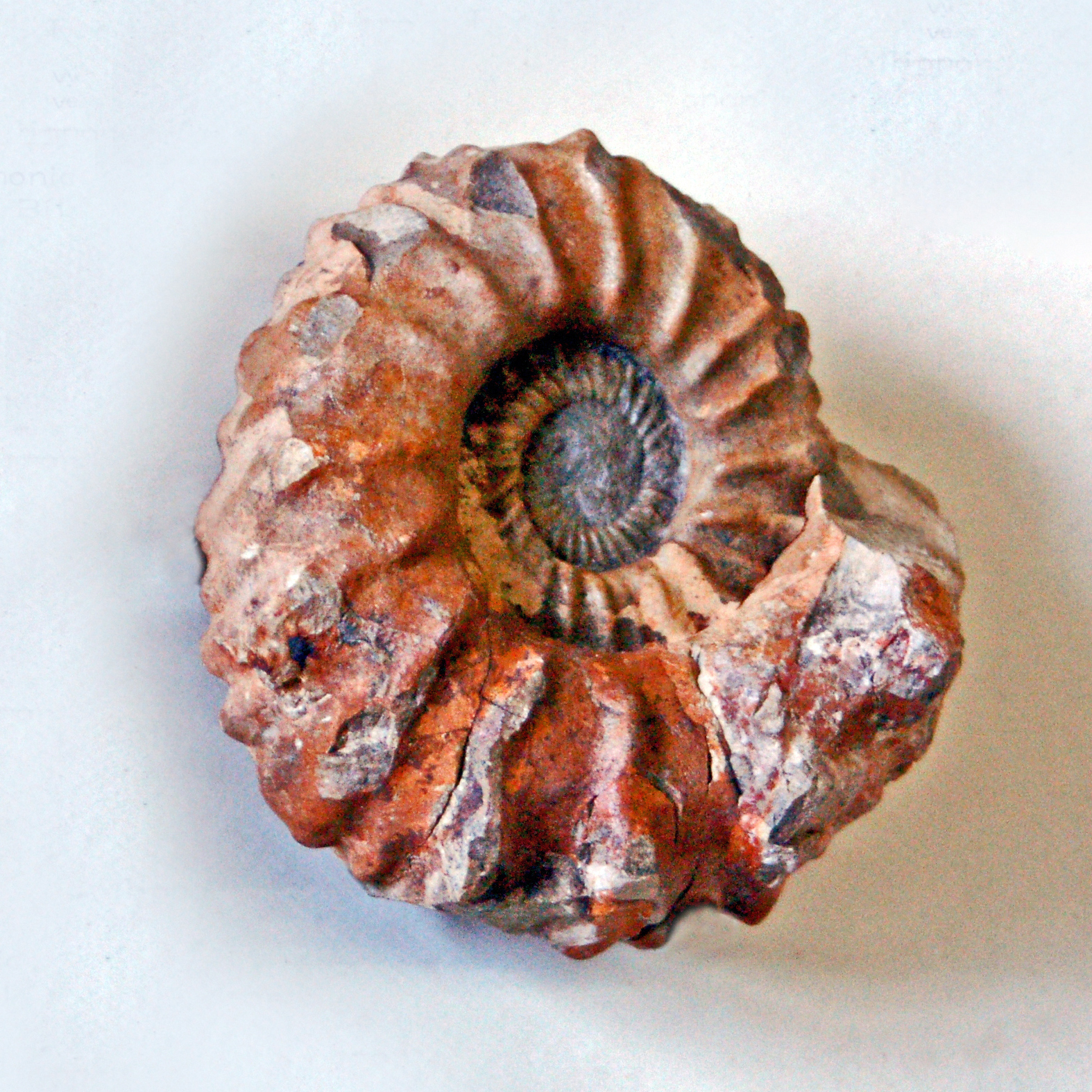
- Collignoniceras woolgari, from Bílá Hora, Prague, Czech Republic, at the National Museum (Prague)

Scientific classification
- Domain: Eukaryota
- Kingdom: Animalia
- Phylum: Mollusca
- Class: Cephalopoda
- Subclass: †Ammonoidea
- Order: †Ammonitida
- Superfamily: †Acanthoceratoidea
- Family: †Collignoniceratidae; Wright & Wright, 1951

Subfamilies
- See text

= Collignoniceratidae =

Collignoniceratidae Temporal range: Turonian–Campanian

Extinct family of ammonites

Collignoniceratidae is a family of Upper Cretaceous ammonites characterized by typically more or less evolute shells with compressed, oval, or square whorl sections; serrate or entire keels; and dense ribs with one to 5 tubercles.

== Taxonomy ==
This family, named by Wright and Wright in 1951, is divided into four subfamilies; Collignoniceratinae, Barroisiceratinae, Peroniceratinae, and Texanitinae. The family is included in the large ammonitid superfamily Acanthoceratoidea which lasted until the end of the Cretaceous.

The Collignoniceratidae are derived from the Acanthoceratidae, first appearing early in the Turonian (early U Cret) and lasting until the mid Campanian (late U Cret), a span of some 20 million years

Collignoniceratidae Wright & Wright, 1951 (synonyms - Prionocyclidae Breistroffer, 1947; Prionotropidae Zittel, 1865)

- Subfamily Barroisiceratinae Basse, 1947
  - Genus Barroisiceras de Grossouvre, 1894
  - Genus Forresteria (Reeside, 1932)
  - Genus Solgerites Reeside, 1932
  - Genus Yabeiceras Tokunaga & Shimizu, 1926
- Subfamily Collignoniceratinae Wright & Wright, 1951
  - Genus Cibolaites Cobban & Hook, 1983
  - Genus Collignoniceras Breistroffer, 1947
  - Genus Collignonicerites Kennedy et al., 2001
  - Genus Prionocyclites Kennedy, 1988
  - Genus Prionocyclus Meek, 1876
  - Genus Reesidites Wright & Matsumoto, 1954
  - Genus Subprionotropis Basse, 1950
- Subfamily Peroniceratinae Hyatt, 1900
  - Genus Gauthiericeras de Grossouvre, 1894
  - Genus Peroniceras de Grossouvre, 1894
  - Genus Prionocycloceras Spath, 1926
- Subfamily Texanitinae Collignon, 1948
  - Genus Bevahites Collignon, 1948
  - Genus Cryptotexanites Kennedy & Cobban, 1993
  - Genus Menabites Collignon, 1948
  - Genus Paratexanites Collignon, 1948
  - Genus Plesiotexanites Matsumoto, 1970
  - Genus Protexanites Matsumoto, 1955
  - Genus Reginaites Reyment, 1957
  - Genus Submortoniceras Spath, 1926
  - Genus Texanites Spath, 1932
