= Albert de Grossouvre =

French geologist (1849–1932)

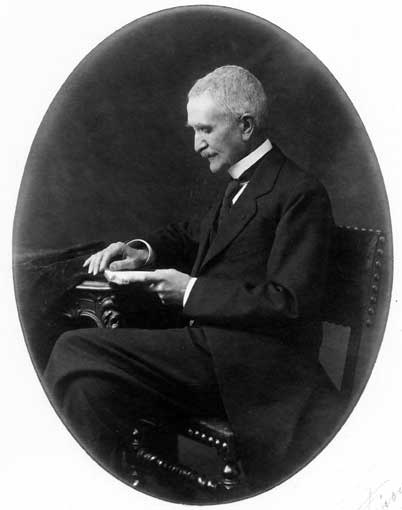

Marie Félix Albert Durand de Grossouvre (23 August 1849, Bourges – 18 May 1932, Bourges) was a French geologist, best known for his research in the fields of stratigraphy and paleontology.

== Biography ==
He studied at the École Polytechnique and the École des Mines de Paris, and afterwards worked as a mining engineer in his hometown of Bourges. In 1889 he attained the post of chief mining engineer. He conducted stratigraphic investigations throughout France, and in the process, uncovered numerous fossils, most notably ammonites. As a cartographer, he participated in the creation of geological maps of central France (Issoudun, Châteauroux, Valençay).

In 1878 he was one of the founders of the Société scientifique, historique et archéologique de la Corrèze. He was an officer of the Légion d'honneur, and in 1913 became a correspondent member of the Académie des sciences (mineralogy section).

In 1894 he circumscribed the ammonite subfamily Acanthoceratinae. He was also the taxonomic authority of the ammonite genera Barroisiceras, Gaudryceras, Hauericeras, Kossmaticeras and Peroniceras.

== Published works ==
His major work on stratigraphy and paleontology, "Recherches sur la craie supérieure" (1893–1901) was published in two volumes (4 tomes). In 1911 he authored a book on the history of Bourges, titled "Le vieux Bourges". His other noteworthy written efforts include:

- Etude sur les gisements de phosphate de chaux du centre de la France, 1885 – Study on the deposits of phosphate of lime in central France.
- Etude sur les gisements de minerai de fer du centre de la France, 1886 – Study on the deposits of iron ore in central France.
- Sur le terrain crétacé dans le Sud-Ouest du bassin de Paris, 1889 – On the Cretaceous strata southwest of the Paris Basin.
- Contributions à la stratigraphie des Pyrénées, 1892 – Contributions to the stratigraphy of the Pyrénées.
- Sur l'Ammonites peramplus et quelques autres fossiles Turoniens, 1899 – On ammonites and some other Turonian fossils.
- Sur quelques fossiles Crétacés de Madagascar, 1899 – On some fossils from Madagascar.
- Crétacé de la Touraine et du Maine, 1900 – The Cretaceous strata of Touraine and Maine.
- Etude paleogéographique sur le détroit de Poitiers, 1901 – Paleontological study on the strait of Poitiers.
- Sur le crétacé des Corbières, 1912 – On the Cretaceous strata of the Corbières Massif.
