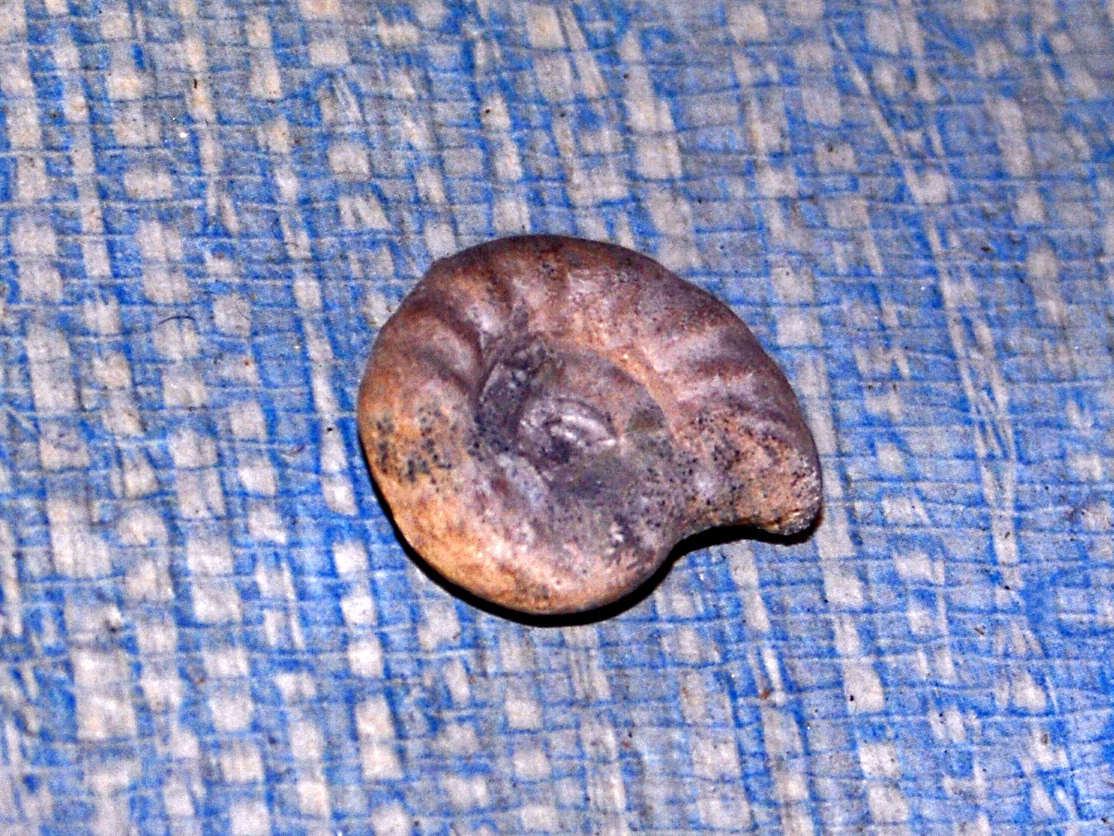
- Fossil shells of Kossmatella agassizianum from Maritime Alps, on display at Galerie de paléontologie et d'anatomie comparée in Paris

Scientific classification
- Kingdom: Animalia
- Phylum: Mollusca
- Class: Cephalopoda
- Subclass: †Ammonoidea
- Order: †Ammonitida
- Family: †Gaudryceratidae
- Genus: †Kossmatella; Jacob, 1907

Species
- Kossmatella cappsi Imlay, 1960; Kossmatella agassizianum (Pictet and Roux, 1847)

Synonyms
- Kosmatella Cossmann, 1909

= Kossmatella =

Kossmatella Temporal range: Albian–Cenomanian

Kossmatella is an extinct genus of ammonoid cephalopods belonging to the family Lytoceratidae. These fast-moving nektonic carnivores lived in the Cretaceous period, from Albian age to Cenomanian age.

== Description ==
Shells of Eulytoceras species are quite small, with rounded whorl section and deep constrictions on the external surface.

== Distribution ==
Fossils of species within this genus have been found in the Cretaceous rocks of Dominican Republic, France, Italy, Madagascar, Mexico, South Africa, Suriname and United States.
