= Sant Corneli =

Mountain in Spain

Coordinates: 42.1817°N 1.0303°E

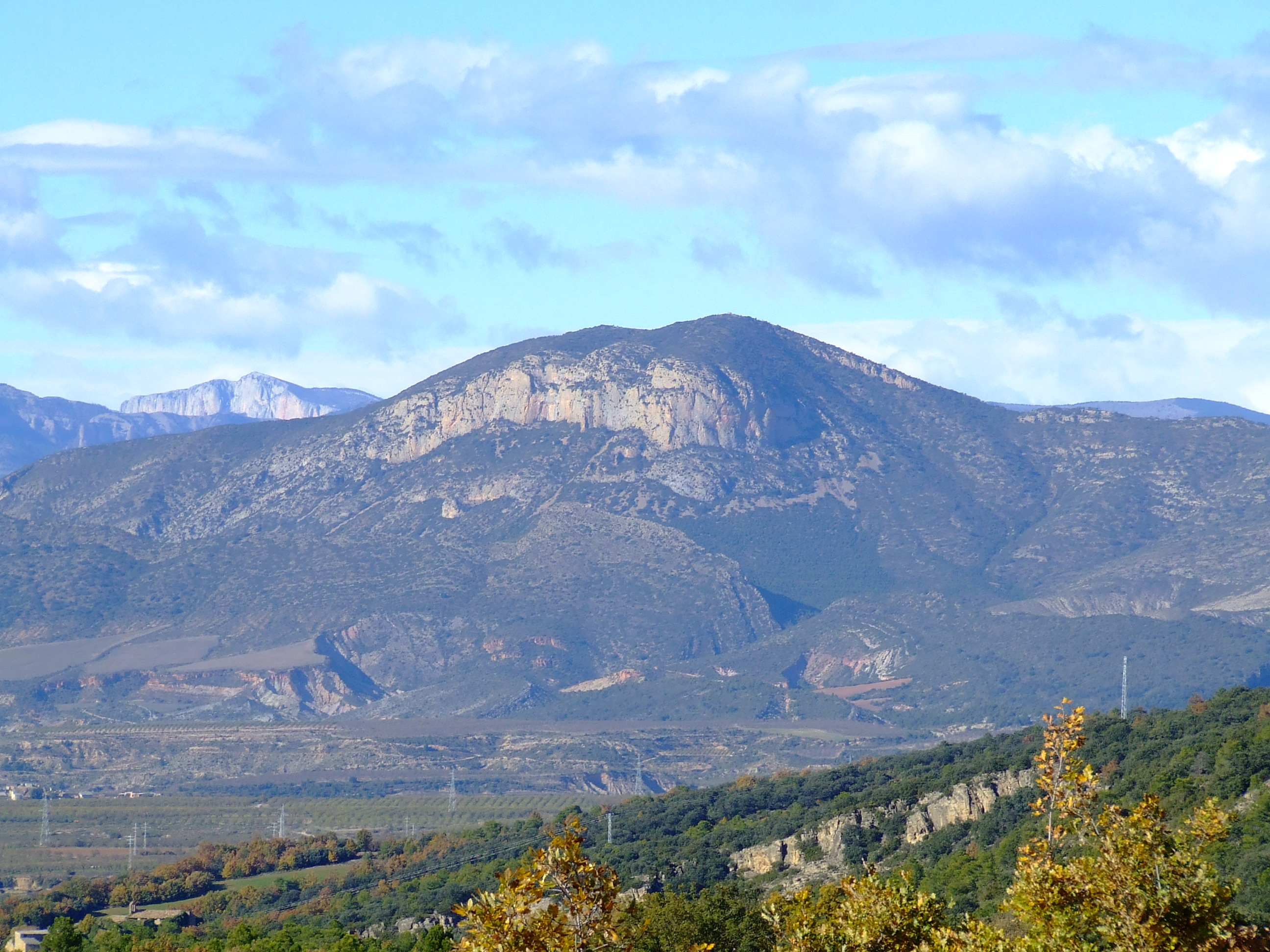

Highest point
- Elevation: 1,351 m (4,432 ft)

Geography
- Location: Catalonia, Spain

Sant Corneli is a mountain of Catalonia, Spain. It has an elevation of 1,351 metres above sea level.

== See also ==
- Mountains of Catalonia
