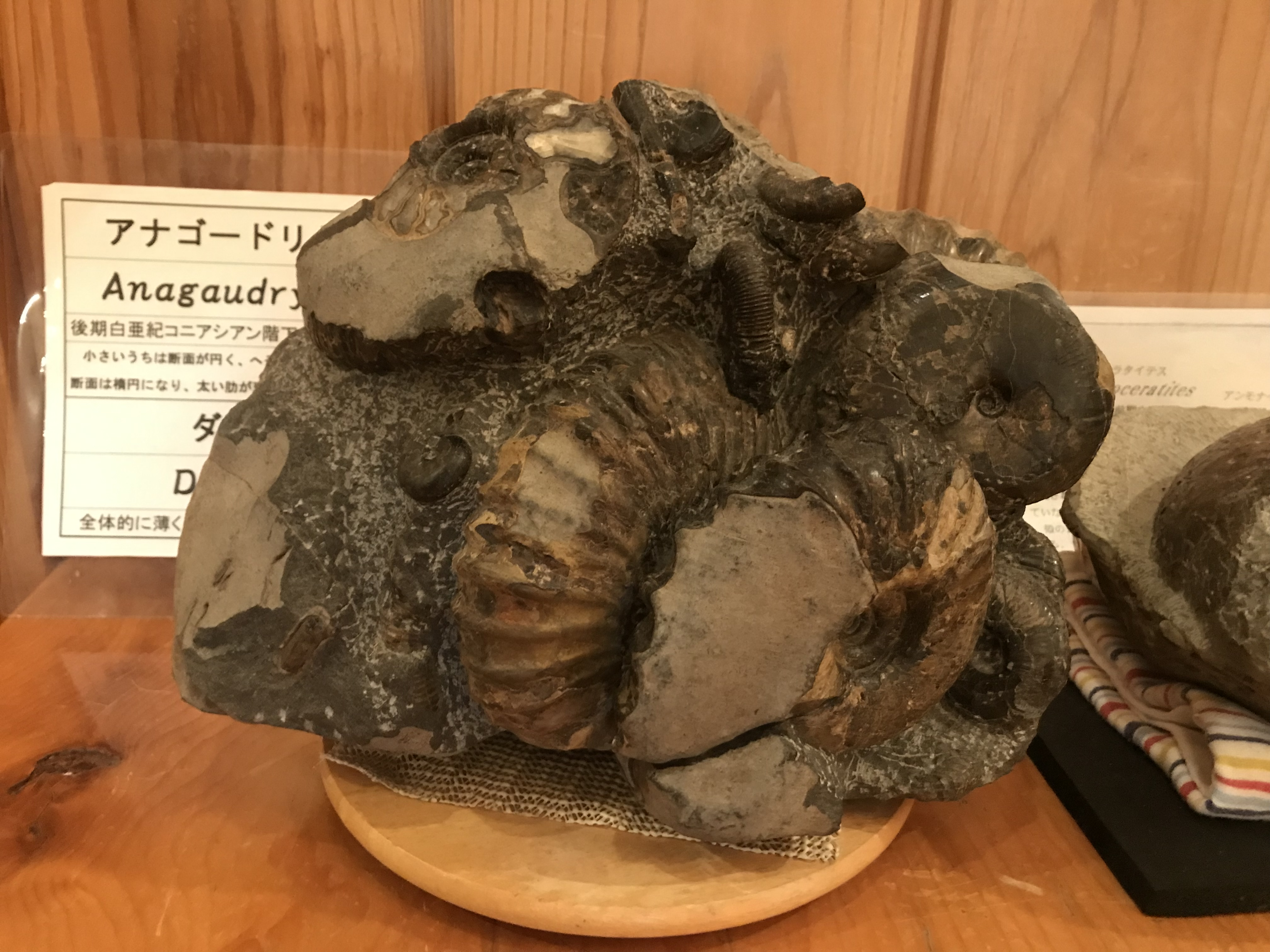
- Anagaudryceras limatum (center)

Scientific classification
- Kingdom: Animalia
- Phylum: Mollusca
- Class: Cephalopoda
- Subclass: †Ammonoidea
- Order: †Ammonitida
- Family: †Gaudryceratidae
- Genus: †Anagaudryceras; Shimizu, 1934

Species
- See text

= Anagaudryceras =

Anagaudryceras Temporal range: Albian - Maastrichtian

Extinct genus of ammonites

Anagaudryceras is an extinct genus of ammonite from the later Cretaceous belonging to the Ammonoidea family Gaudryceratidae. Anagaudryceras has a moderately involute shell with a deep umbilicus and strongly ribbed outer whorl. Ribs are thick and rounded and cross over the venter uninterrupted.
