= Santonian =

Fourth age of the Late Cretaceous epoch

- 85.7 ± 0.2 – 83.6 ± 0.2 Ma

Chronology
← / K-Pg mass extinction
Subdivision of the Cretaceous according to the ICS, as of 2024. Vertical axis scale: Millions of years ago

Etymology
- Name formality: Formal

Usage information
- Celestial body: Earth
- Regional usage: Global (ICS)
- Time scale(s) used: ICS Time Scale

Definition
- Chronological unit: Age
- Stratigraphic unit: Stage
- Time span formality: Formal
- Lower boundary definition: FAD of the Inoceramid Bivalve Cladoceramus undulatoplicatus
- Lower boundary GSSP: Olazagutia, Spain; 42.8668°N 2.1968°W
- Lower GSSP ratified: January 2013
- Upper boundary definition: Base of Chron C33r
- Upper boundary GSSP: Bottaccione, Gubbio, Italy; 43.3627°N 12.5828°E
- Upper GSSP ratified: October 2022

The Santonian is an age in the geologic timescale or a chronostratigraphic stage. It is a subdivision of the Late Cretaceous Epoch or Upper Cretaceous Series. It spans the time between 85.7 ± 0.2 mya (million years ago) and 83.6 ± 0.2 mya. The Santonian is preceded by the Coniacian and is followed by the Campanian.

== Stratigraphic definition ==
The Santonian Stage was established by French geologist Henri Coquand in 1857. It is named after the city of Saintes in the region of Saintonge, where the original type locality is located.

The base of the Santonian Stage is defined by the appearance of the inoceramid bivalve Cladoceramus undulatoplicatus. The GSSP (official reference profile) for the base of the Santonian Stage is located near Olazagutia, Spain; it was ratified by the Subcommission on Cretaceous Stratigraphy in 2012. The Santonian's top (the base of the Campanian Stage) is informally marked by the extinction of the crinoid Marsupites testudinarius. A GSSP for the top of the Santonian was ratified in October 2022 in Bottaccione, Gubbio, Italy.

=== Subdivision ===
The Santonian is sometimes subdivided into Lower, Middle and Upper Substages. In the Tethys domain the Santonian is coeval with a single ammonite biozone: that of Placenticeras polyopsis. Biostratigraphy based on inoceramids, nanoplankton or forams is more detailed.
