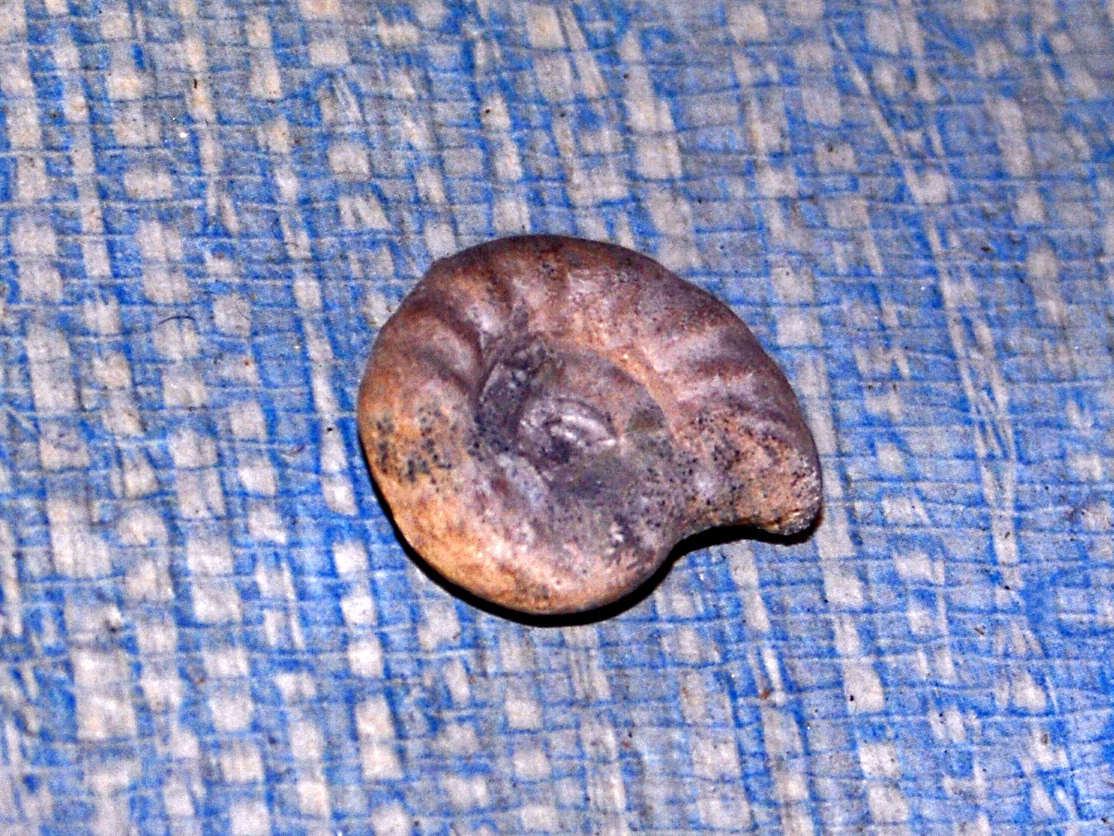
- Fossil shells of Kossmatella agassizianum from Maritime Alps, on display at Galerie de paléontologie et d'anatomie comparée in Paris

Scientific classification
- Domain: Eukaryota
- Kingdom: Animalia
- Phylum: Mollusca
- Class: Cephalopoda
- Subclass: †Ammonoidea
- Order: †Ammonitida
- Suborder: †Lytoceratina
- Family: †Gaudryceratidae; Spath, 1927

Genera
- Anagaudryceras; Eotetragonites; Gaudryceras; Kossmatella; Vertebrites; Zelandites

= Gaudryceratidae =

Gaudryceratidae Temporal range: Barremian–Maastrichtian

Extinct family of molluscs

Gaudryceratidae is a family belonging to the extinct ammonoid suborder Lytoceratina that lived from the Barremian of the Lower Cretaceous to the Maastrichtian of the Upper Cretaceous.

Gaudryceratids are lytocerins typically with rounded, oval, or depressed whorl sections that become higher with age; suture with more or less symmetrical, bifid saddles, internal suture with a single saddle.
