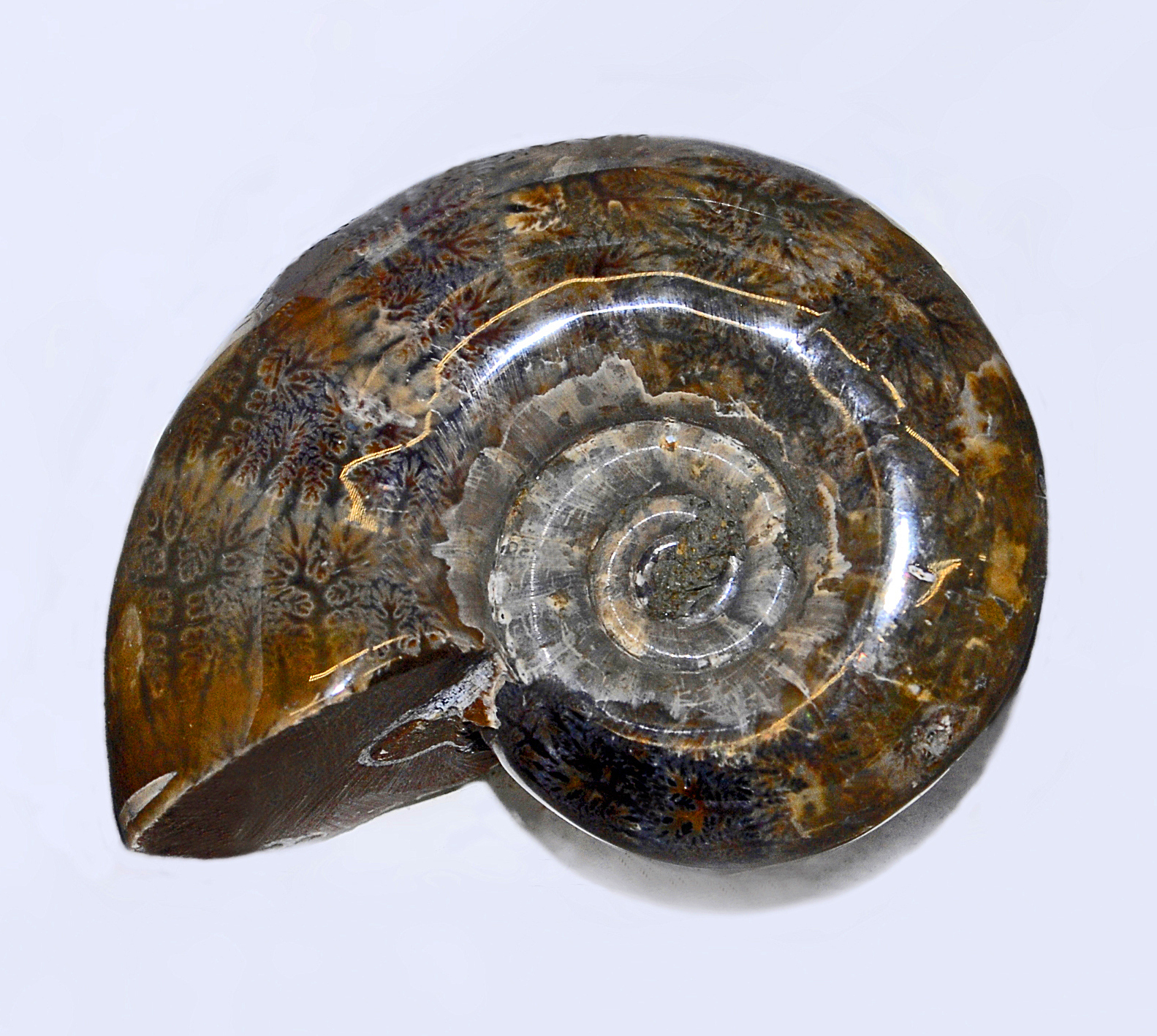
- Fossil of Gaudryceras species

Scientific classification
- Kingdom: Animalia
- Phylum: Mollusca
- Class: Cephalopoda
- Subclass: †Ammonoidea
- Order: †Ammonitida
- Family: †Gaudryceratidae
- Genus: †Gaudryceras de Grossouvre, 1894

= Gaudryceras =

Gaudryceras Temporal range: Cretaceous

Genus of molluscs (fossil)

Gaudryceras is an ammonite genus belonging to the family Gaudryceratidae.

These cephalopods were fast-moving nektonic carnivores. They lived in the Cretaceous period, from Albian to Maastrichtian stages (105.3 to 66.043 Ma).

== Subgenera and species ==
Subg. Gaudryceras (Gaudryceras) de Grossouvre, 1894

Gaudryceras (Gaudryceras) alamedense (Smith, 1889)
Gaudryceras (Gaudryceras) aureum (Anderson, 1958)
Gaudryceras (Gaudryceras) cassisianum d'Orbigny, 1850
Gaudryceras (Gaudryceras) delvallense (Anderson, 1958)
Gaudryceras (Gaudryceras) denmanense (Whiteaves, 1903)
Gaudryceras (Gaudryceras) mitis Hauer, 1866
Gaudryceras (Gaudryceras) strictum Kennedy et al., 2007
Gaudryceras (Gaudryceras) texanum (Anderson, 1958)

Subg. Gaudryceras (Mesogaudryceras) Spath, 1927

Gaudryceras (Mesogaudryceras) leptonema Sharpe, 1855

Subg. Gaudryceras (Neogaudryceras) Shimizu, 1935

Gaudryceras (Neogaudryceras) pictum Yabe, 1903
Gaudryceras (Neogaudryceras) beantalyense Collignon, 1956
Gaudryceras (Neogaudryceras) denseplicatum Jimbo, 1894
Gaudryceras (Neogaudryceras) kayei Forbes, 1846
Gaudryceras (Neogaudryceras) makarovense Shigeta and Maeda, 2005
Gaudryceras (Neogaudryceras) seymouriense Macellari, 1986
Gaudryceras (Neogaudryceras) stefaninii Venzo, 1936
Gaudryceras (Neogaudryceras) tenuiliratum Yabe, 1903
Gaudryceras (Neogaudryceras) varagurense Kossmat, 1895
Gaudryceras (Neogaudryceras) varagurense patagonicum (Paulcke, 1907)
Gaudryceras (Neogaudryceras) varicostatum van Hoepen, 1921

== Distribution ==
Fossils of species within this genus have been found in the Cretaceous sediments of Angola, Antarctica, Australia, Austria, Brazil, Chile, France, Germany, India, Japan, Madagascar, Mexico, New Zealand, Nigeria, Russia, South Africa, Spain and United States.
