= Olazti/Olazagutía =

Municipality in Navarre, Spain

Coordinates: 42.8778°N 2.19444°W

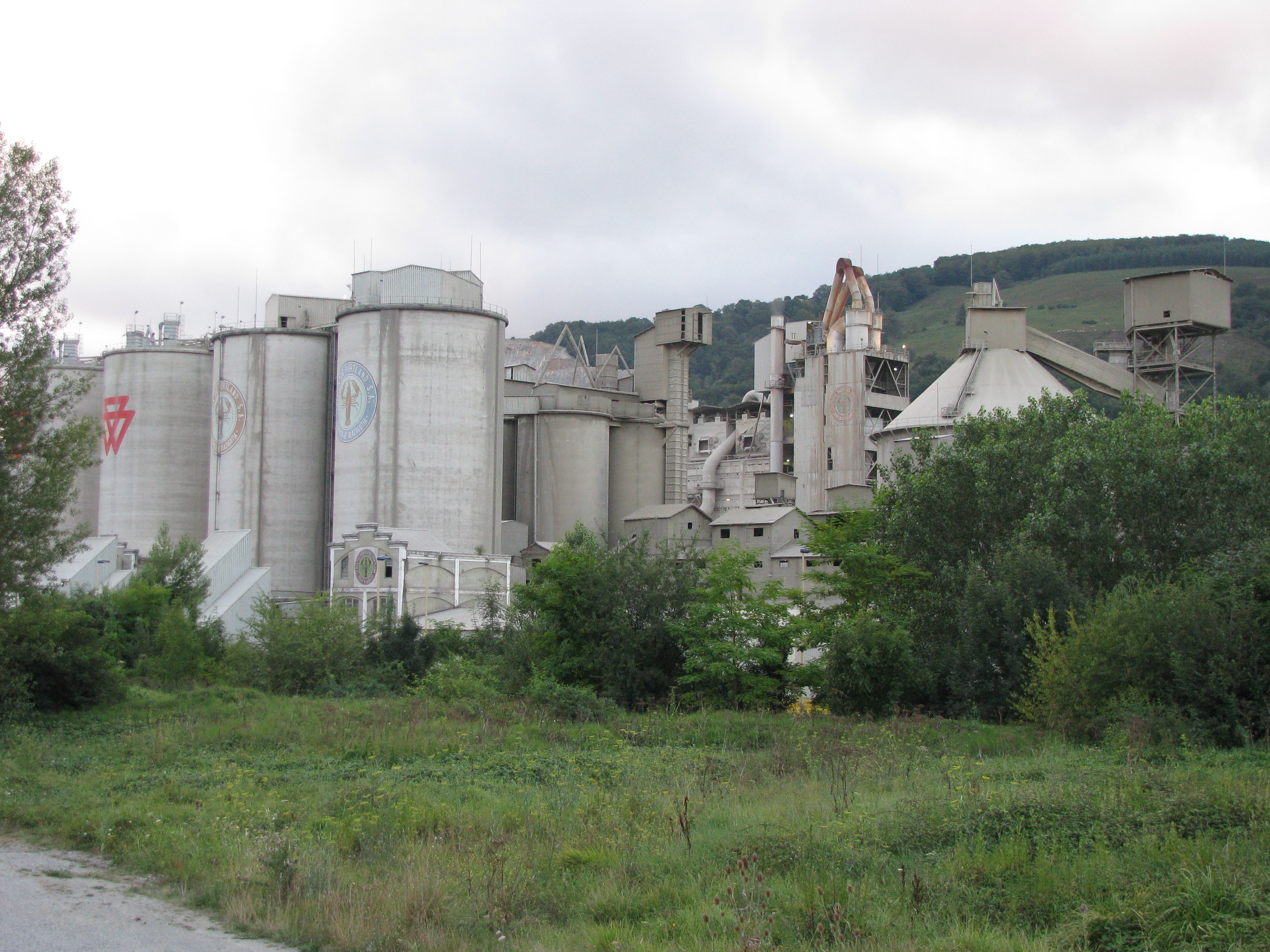
Cement Plant in Olazagutía-Olazti, Navarre Region, Spain

Olazti/Olazagutía is a town and municipality located in the province and autonomous community of Navarre, northern Spain.
