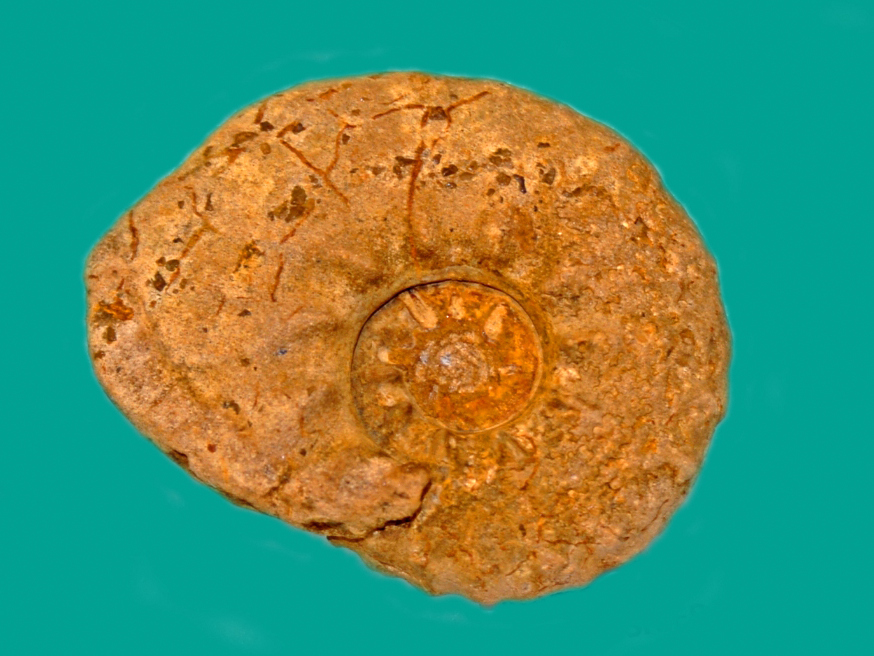
- Fossil of Barroisiceras species. Coniacian of Madagascar

Scientific classification
- Kingdom: Animalia
- Phylum: Mollusca
- Class: Cephalopoda
- Subclass: †Ammonoidea
- Order: †Ammonitida
- Family: †Collignoniceratidae
- Subfamily: †Barroisiceratinae
- Genus: †Barroisiceras de Grossouvre, 1894

Subgenera
- Barroisiceras (Alstadenites); Barroisiceras (Barroisiceras); Barroisiceras (Texasia)

= Barroisiceras =

Barroisiceras Temporal range: Coniacian

Genus of molluscs (fossil)

Barroisiceras is an acanthoceratacean ammonite from the Upper Cretaceous, Coniacian, included in the family Collignoniceratidae.

== Diagnosis ==
The shell of Barroisiceras is rather involute, coiled such that the outer whorl embraces much of the previous, and is generally compressed. Whorls are high with a strong crenulate keel and sparse umbilical tubercles that develop into pairs of commonly flat ribs.

== Taxonomy ==
Barroisiceras is divided two subgenera, Barroisiceras (Barroisiceras) and Barroisiceras (Texasia), with Alstadenites sometimes added as a third, Barroisiceras (Alstadenites). B. (Barroiciceras) is moderately involute and the suture is rather simple. B. (Texasia) is more evolute and has a distinctly eccentric umbilicus and more complex suture.

== Distribution ==
Cretaceous of Austria, Czechoslovakia, France, Hungary, Italy, Japan, Morocco, Slovakia, Spain, Trinidad and Tobago and USSR
