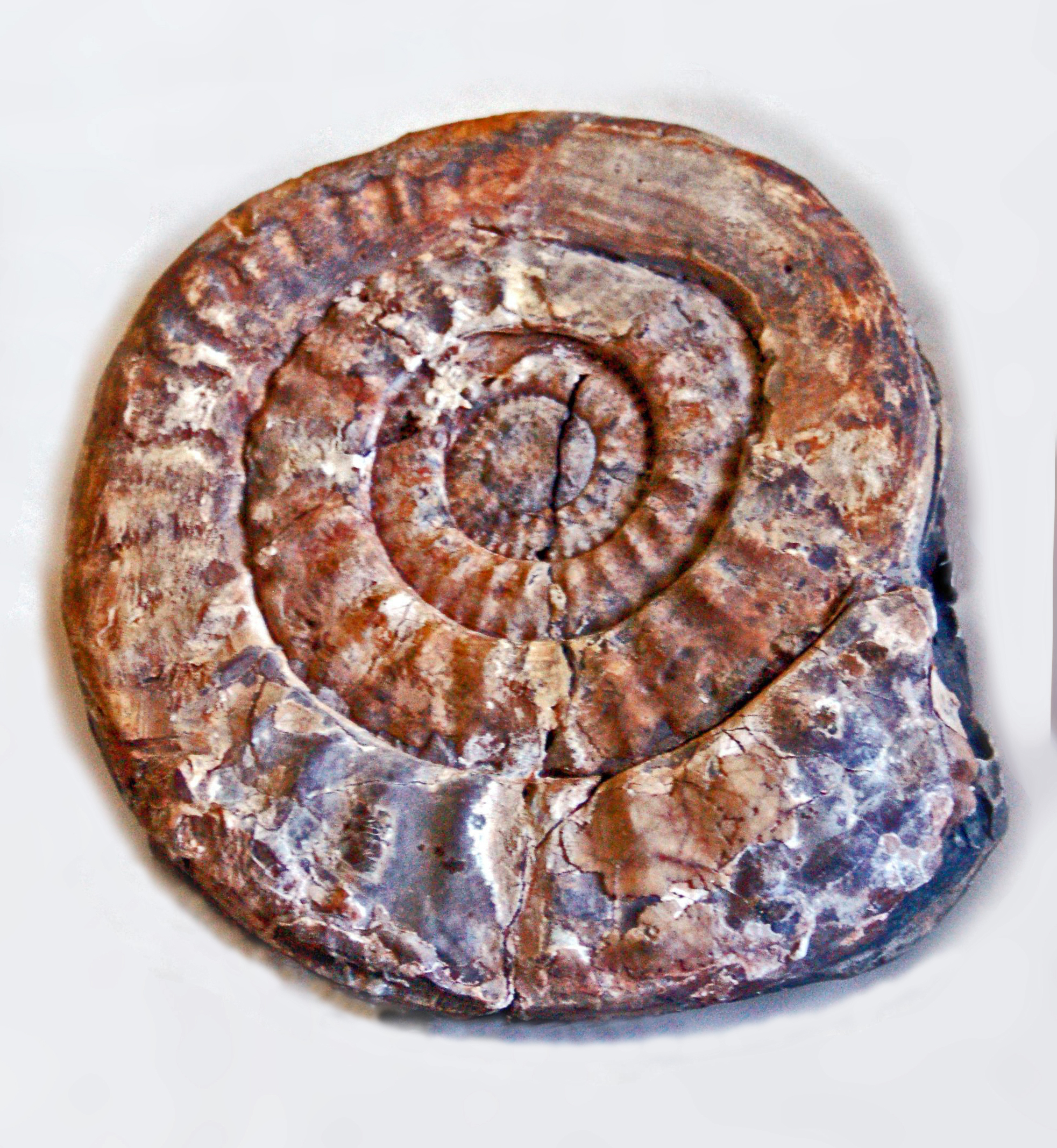
- Peroniceras tricarinatum, from Březno u Loun, Czech Republic, at the National Museum (Prague)

Scientific classification
- Kingdom: Animalia
- Phylum: Mollusca
- Class: Cephalopoda
- Subclass: †Ammonoidea
- Order: †Ammonitida
- Family: †Collignoniceratidae
- Subfamily: †Peroniceratinae
- Genus: †Peroniceras de Grossouvre, 1894

Subgenera
- P. (Zuluiceras); P. (Peroniceras)

= Peroniceras =

Peroniceras Temporal range: Coniacian–Santonian

Genus of molluscs (fossil)

Peroniceras is an ammonite (an extinct group of marine mollusc) belonging to the Ammonitida family Collignoniceratidae.

Species of this genus were widespread throughout the world. They were fast-moving nektonic carnivore shelled ammonoids.

== Distribution ==
Cretaceous of Antarctica, Cameroon, Canada (British Columbia), Denmark, France, India, Mexico, Nigeria, South Africa, United States (California), Venezuela; Jurassic of Japan
