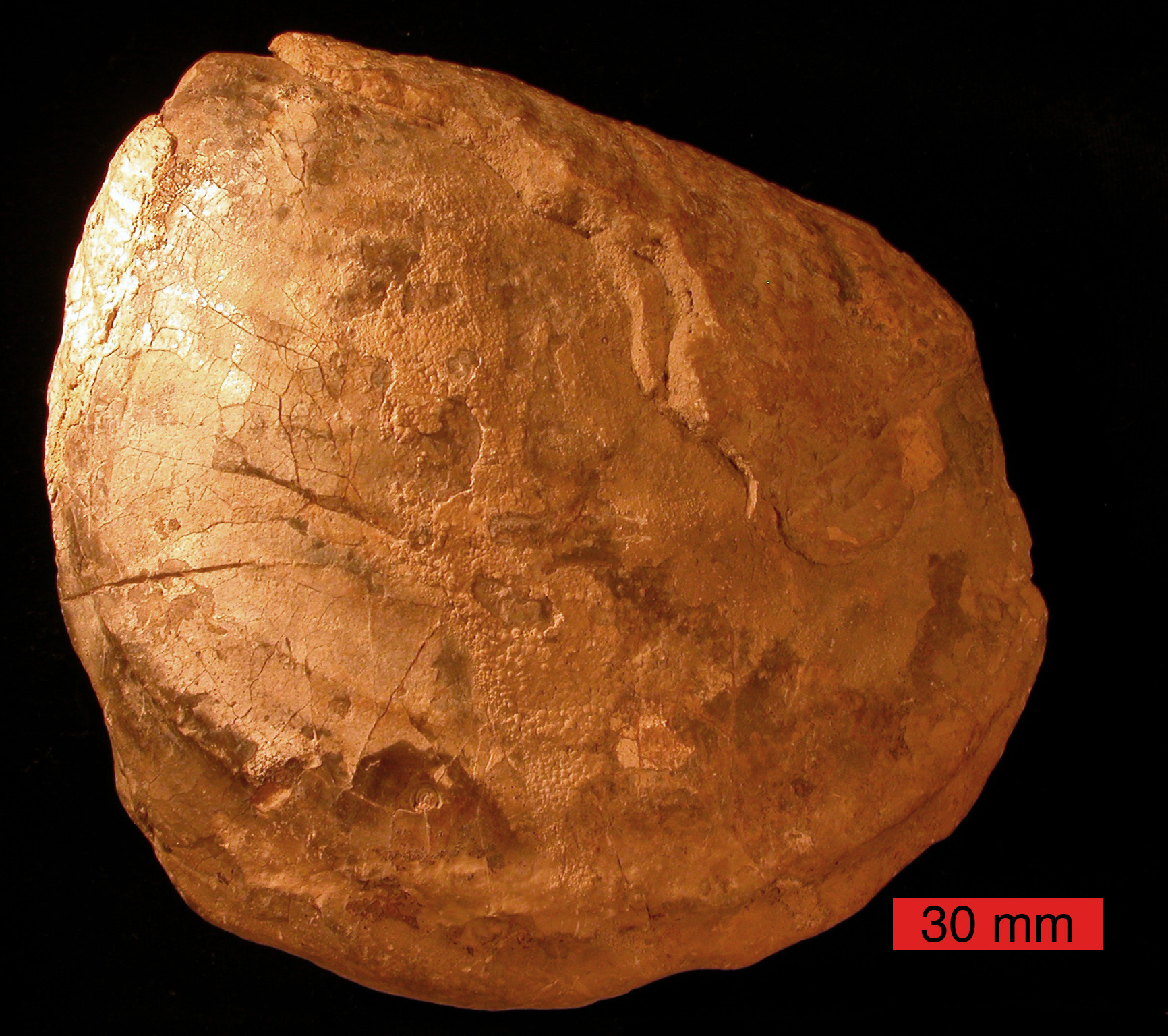
- Inoceramus from the Cretaceous of South Dakota

Scientific classification
- Kingdom: Animalia
- Phylum: Mollusca
- Class: Bivalvia
- Order: Pteriida
- Superfamily: †Ambonychioidea
- Family: †Inoceramidae; Giebel, 1852

= Inoceramidae =

Inoceramidae Temporal range: Permian–Late Cretaceous

Extinct family of bivalves

The Inoceramidae are an extinct family of bivalves ("clams") in the class Mollusca. Fossils of inoceramids are found in marine sediments of Permian to latest Cretaceous in age. Inoceramids tended to live in upper bathyal and neritic environments. Many species of inoceramid are found all over the world, demonstrating the wide distribution of their preferred ecosystems, and possibly long-lived planktotrophic larvae. Despite their wide distribution, the pace of evolution of inoceramids was great, with species ranges commonly averaging 0.2–0.5 Ma.

== Size ==
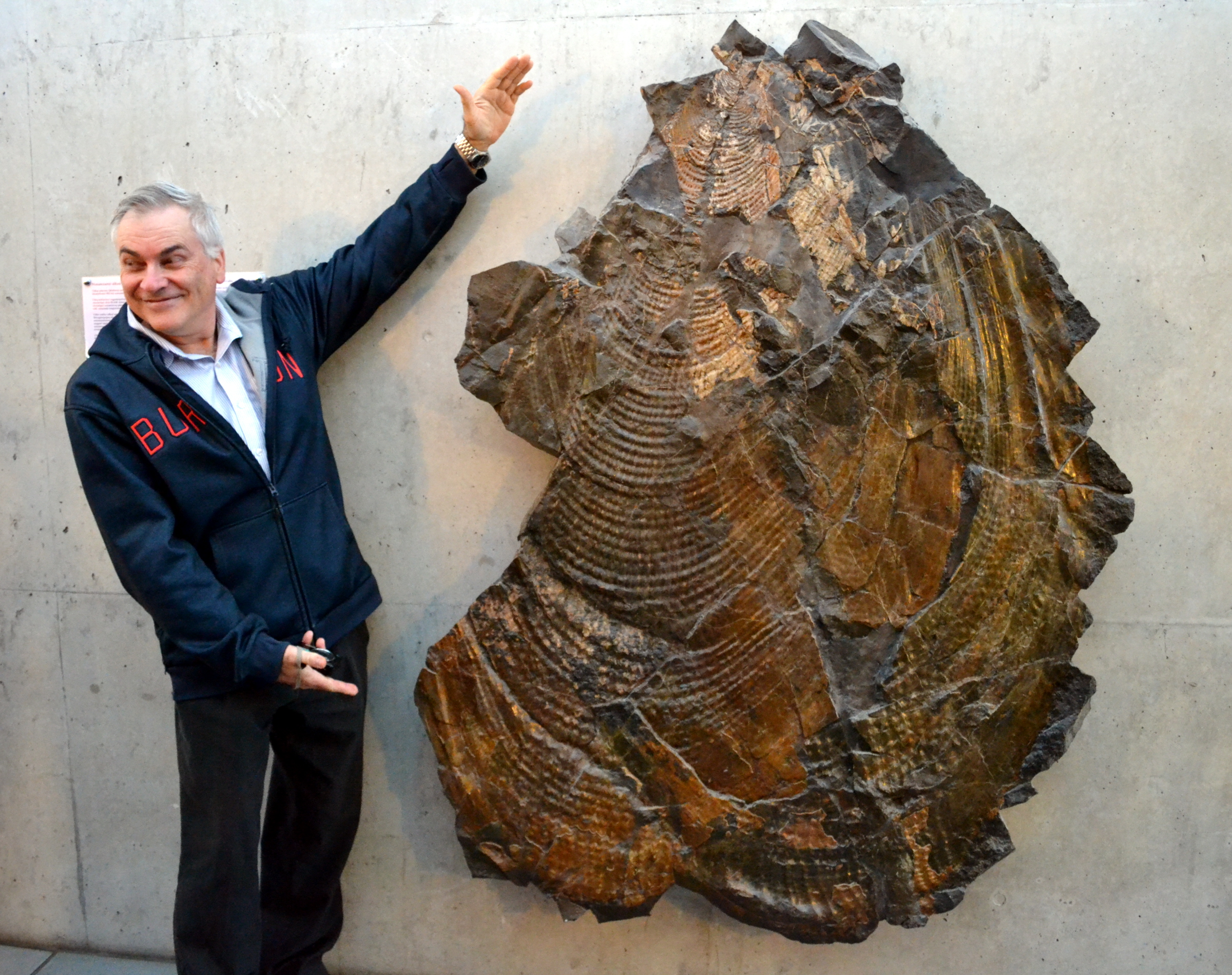
Gigantic specimen of Inoceramus steenstrupi 187 cm (74 in) across, from Greenland

Various species of inoceramids have achieved shell sizes ranging from small to large. Members of the Inoceramus and Cladoceramus genera have shells of more than 1 metre (3 ft 3 in) in length. In 1952, a huge specimen of Inoceramus steenstrupi 1.87 metres (6 ft 2 in) long, was found in Qilakitsoq, the Nuussuaq Peninsula, Greenland. This fossil is 83 Ma old, the Upper Santonian or Lower Campanian stage. Specimens referred to Antarcticeramus are also gigantic, some around 1.8 m and shell thicknesses of 3 cm.

== Taxonomy ==
Inoceramidae Giebel, 1852

- Genus Actinoceramus Meek, 1864 (Synonym = Birostrina De Luc & Sowerby, 1821)
- Genus Anopaea Eichwald, 1861
- Genus Antarcticeramus Crame & Luther, 1997
- Genus Arctomytiloides Polubotko, 1992
- Genus Cataceramus Cox, 1969
- Genus Cladoceramus Seitz, 1961
- Genus Cremnoceramus Heinz, 1932
- Genus Endocostea Whitfield, 1877
- Genus Inoceramus Sowerby, 1814
  - Subgenus Inoceramus (Cordiceramus) (Heinz, 1932)
  - Subgenus Inoceramus (Inoceramus) Sowerby, 1814
  - Subgenus Inoceramus (Sphenoceramus) (Böhm, 1915)
- Genus Magadiceramus Heinz, 1932
- Genus Mytiloides Brongniart, 1822
- Genus Neocomiceramus Pokhialainen, 1972
- Genus Neoinoceramus Ihering, 1902
- Genus Parainoceramus Voronetz, 1936
- Genus Platyceramus Heinz, 1932
- Genus Pseudomytiloides Koschelkina, 1963
- Genus Retroceramus Koschelkina, 1958
- Genus Spyridoceramus Cox, 1969
- Genus Tethyoceramus Sornay, 1980
- Genus Trochoceramus Heinz, 1932
- Genus Volviceramus Stoliczka, 1871
