= Turonian =

Second age of the Late Cretaceous epoch

- 93.9 ± 0.2 – 89.8 ± 0.3 Ma
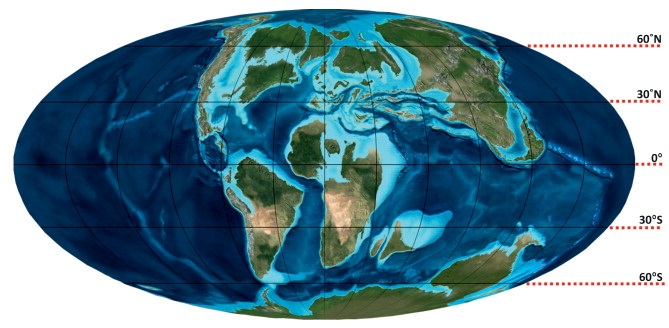
- Paleogeography of the late Turonian (90 Ma), showing the high sea level at the time

Chronology
← / K-Pg mass extinction
Subdivision of the Cretaceous according to the ICS, as of 2024. Vertical axis scale: Millions of years ago

Etymology
- Name formality: Formal

Usage information
- Celestial body: Earth
- Regional usage: Global (ICS)
- Time scale(s) used: ICS Time Scale

Definition
- Chronological unit: Age
- Stratigraphic unit: Stage
- Time span formality: Formal
- Lower boundary definition: FAD of the Ammonite Watinoceras devonense
- Lower boundary GSSP: Rock Canyon, Colorado, USA; 38.2822°N 104.7275°W
- Lower GSSP ratified: September 2003
- Upper boundary definition: Not formally defined
- Upper boundary definition candidates: FAD of the Inoceramid Bivalve Cremnoceramus rotundatus
- Upper boundary GSSP candidate section(s): Słupia Nadbrzeżna, Poland; Pueblo, Colorado, USA; Salzgitter-Salder quarry, Germany

The Turonian is, in the ICS' geologic timescale, the second age in the Late Cretaceous Epoch, or a stage in the Upper Cretaceous Series. It spans the time between 93.9 ± 0.2 Ma and 89.8 ± 0.3 Ma (million years ago). The Turonian is preceded by the Cenomanian Stage and underlies the Coniacian Stage.

At the beginning of the Turonian an oceanic anoxic event (OAE 2) took place, also referred to as the Cenomanian-Turonian boundary event or the "Bonarelli Event". Sea level fall took place in the latter part of the Turonian from the highstand at the beginning of the Turonian.

== Stratigraphic definition ==
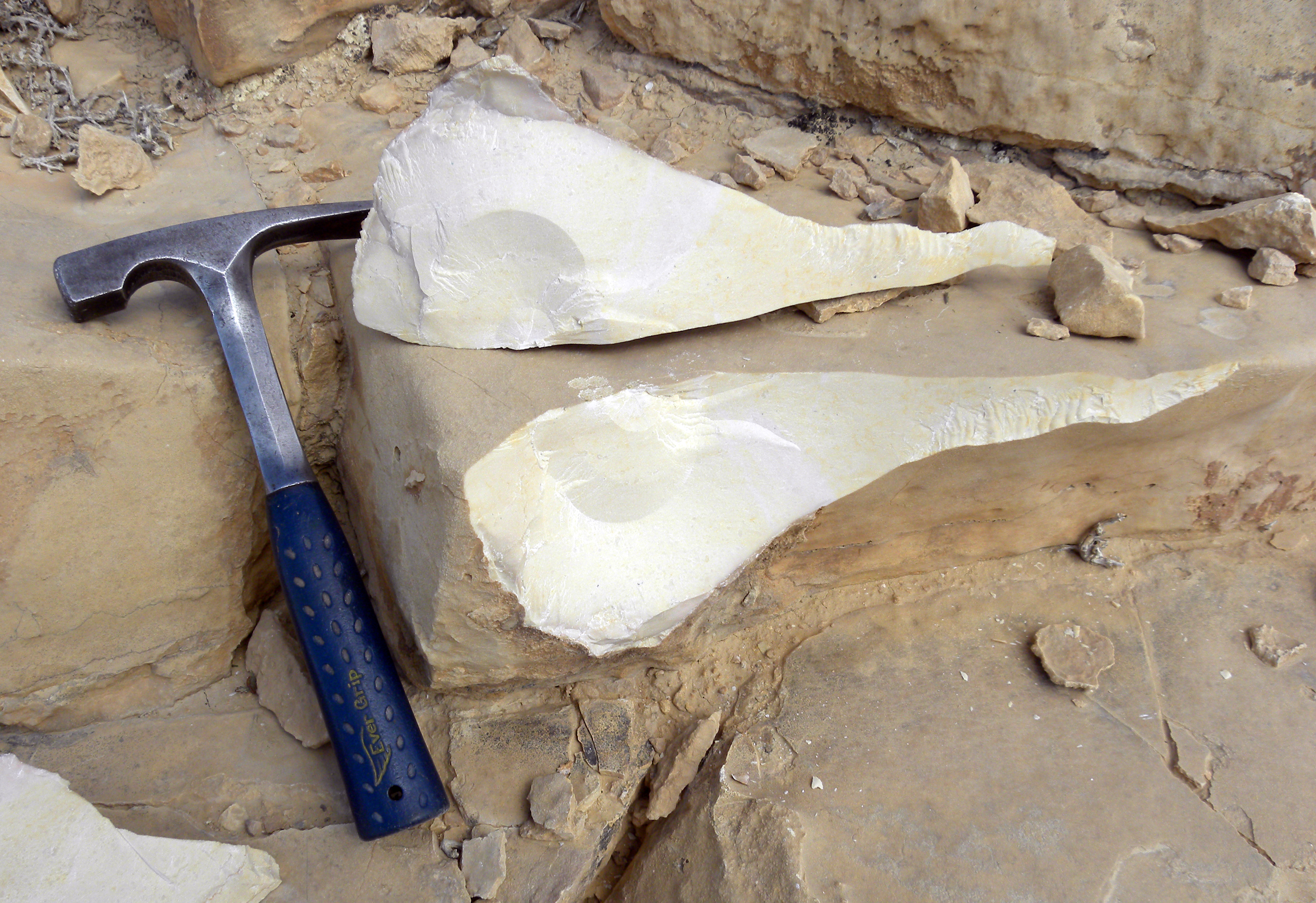
Lithographic limestone from the Gerofit Formation (Turonian) north of Makhtesh Ramon, southern Israel; a variety of Jerusalem stone (meleke).

The Turonian (French: Turonien) was defined by the French paleontologist Alcide d'Orbigny (1802–1857) in 1842. Orbigny named it after the French city of Tours in the region of Touraine (department Indre-et-Loire), which is the original type locality.

The base of the Turonian Stage is defined as the place where the ammonite species Watinoceras devonense first appears in the stratigraphic column. The official reference profile (the GSSP) for the base of the Turonian is located in the Rock Canyon anticline near Pueblo, Colorado (United States, coordinates: 38° 16' 56" N, 104° 43' 39" W).

The top of the Turonian Stage (the base of the Coniacian) is defined as the place in the stratigraphic column where the inoceramid bivalve species Cremnoceramus rotundatus first appears.

=== Subdivision ===
The Turonian is sometimes subdivided in Lower/Early, Middle and Upper/Late substages or subages. In the Tethys domain, it contains the following ammonite biozones:

- zone of Subprionocyclus neptuni (in the Upper Turonian)
- zone of Collignoniceras woollgari (in the Middle Turonian)
- zone of Mammites nodosoides
- zone of Watinoceras coloradoense or Watinoceras devonense (last two both in the Lower Turonian)

Other important index fossils are species of the inoceramid genus Inoceramus (I. schloenbachi, I. lamarcki and I. labiatus). Inoceramids are bivalve Mollusca related to today's mussels.
