= List of the prehistoric life of New Mexico =

This list of the prehistoric life of New Mexico contains the various prehistoric life-forms whose fossilized remains have been reported from within the US state of New Mexico.

== Precambrian ==
The Paleobiology Database records no known occurrences of Precambrian fossils in New Mexico.

== Paleozoic ==
- †Actinoceras
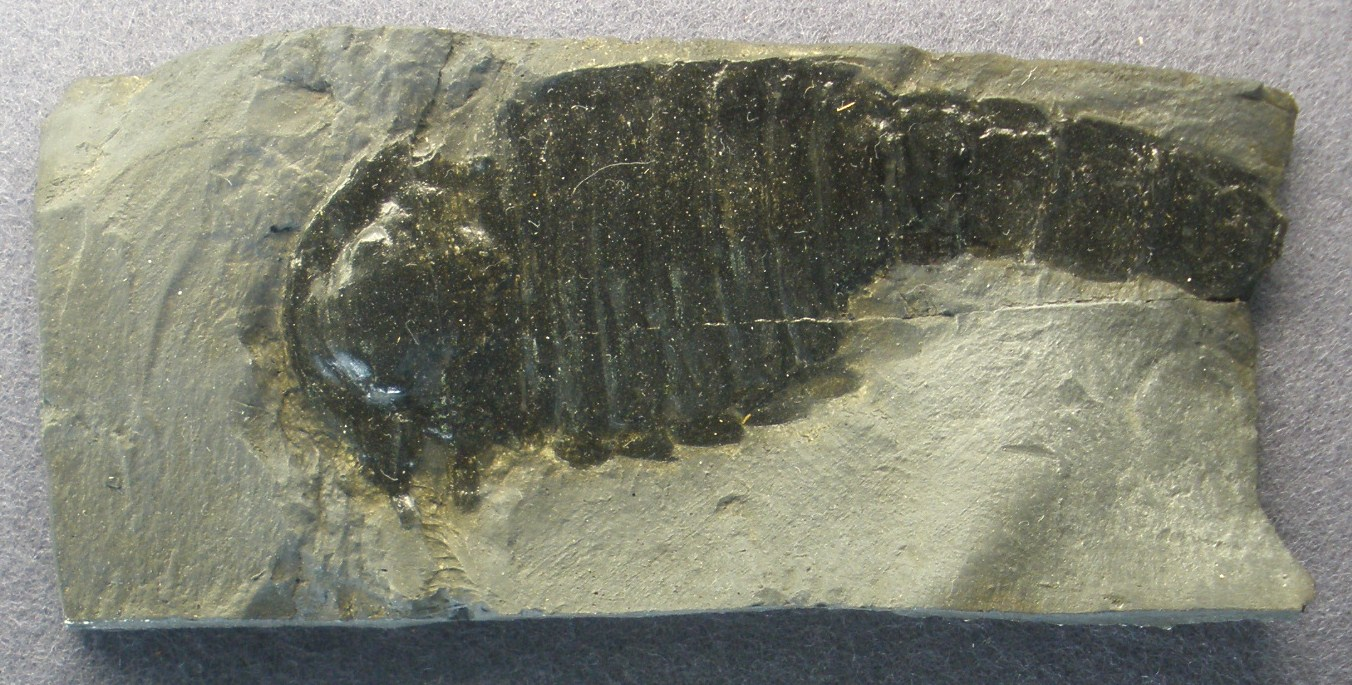
- Fossil of the Early Devonian-Permian eurypterid ("sea scorpion") Adelophthalmus
  †Adelophthalmus
- †Aenigmacaris
- †Aerosaurus – type locality for genus
  - †Aerosaurus wellesi – type locality for species
- †Agassizodus
- †Amphiscapha
- †Ananias
- †Anconastes – type locality for genus
  - †Anconastes vesperus – type locality for species
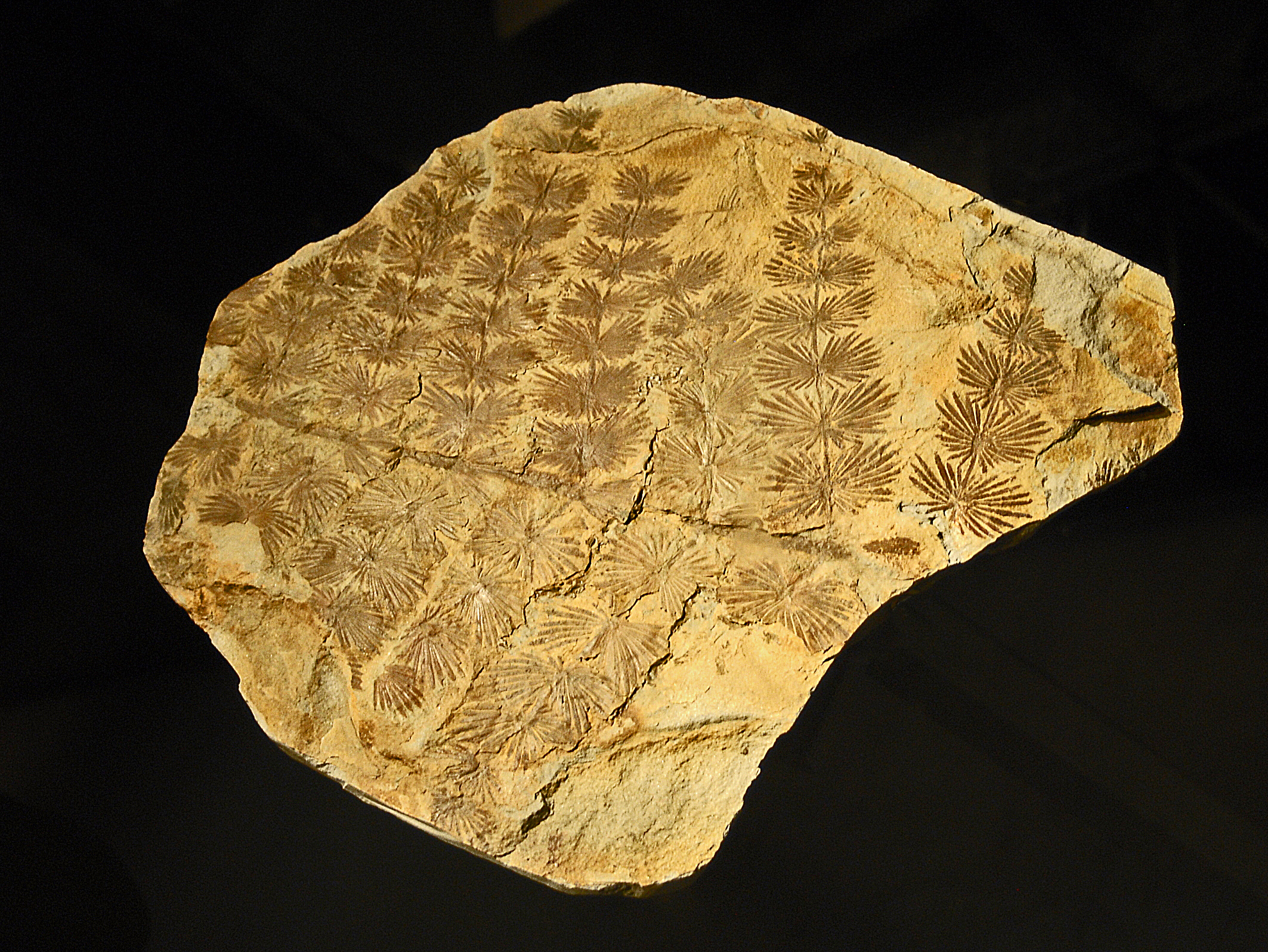
- Fossil of the Carboniferous horsetail relative Annularia
  †Annularia
  - †Annularia radiata
  - †Annularia sphenophylloides
- †Anomphalus
- †Aphlebia
- †Archaeocidaris
- Archaeolithophyllum
- †Archeria
- †Armenoceras
- †Aspidosaurus
- †Athyris
  - †Athyris lamellosa
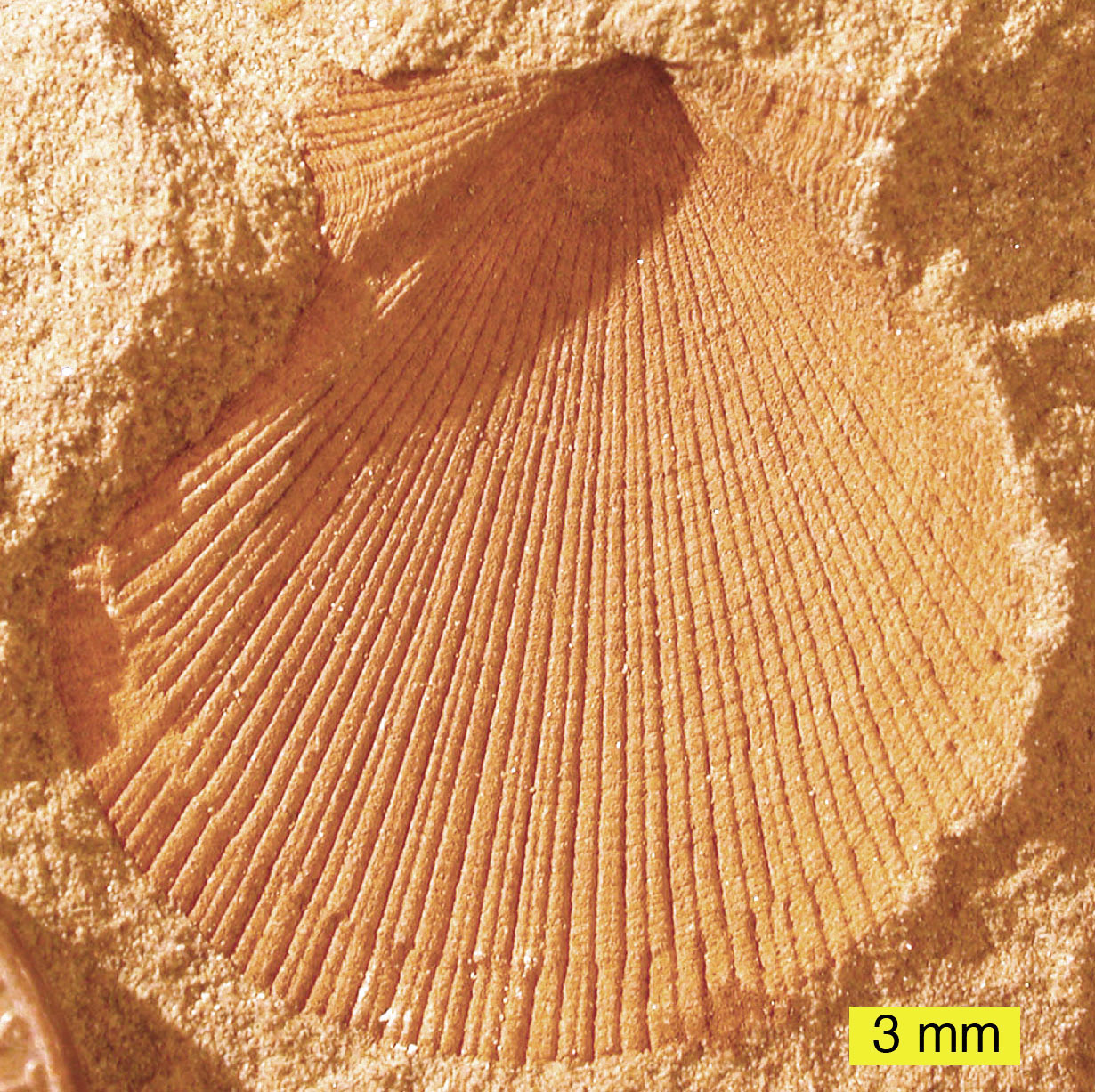
- Mold fossil of a shell of the Early Devonian-Late Triassic bivalve Aviculopecten
  †Aviculopecten
  - †Aviculopecten arctisulcatus
  - †Aviculopecten basilicus
  - †Aviculopecten coryeanus – type locality for species
  - †Aviculopecten moorei – or unidentified comparable form
- †Baldwinonus – type locality for genus
- †Bellerophon
  - †Bellerophon graphicus
- †Bourbonnella – or unidentified comparable form
- †Brachyphyllum
- †Calamites
  - †Calamites cistii
- †Callipteris
  - †Callipteris conferta
  - †Callipteris lyratifolia
- †Caninia
- †Cardiocarpus
- †Catenipora
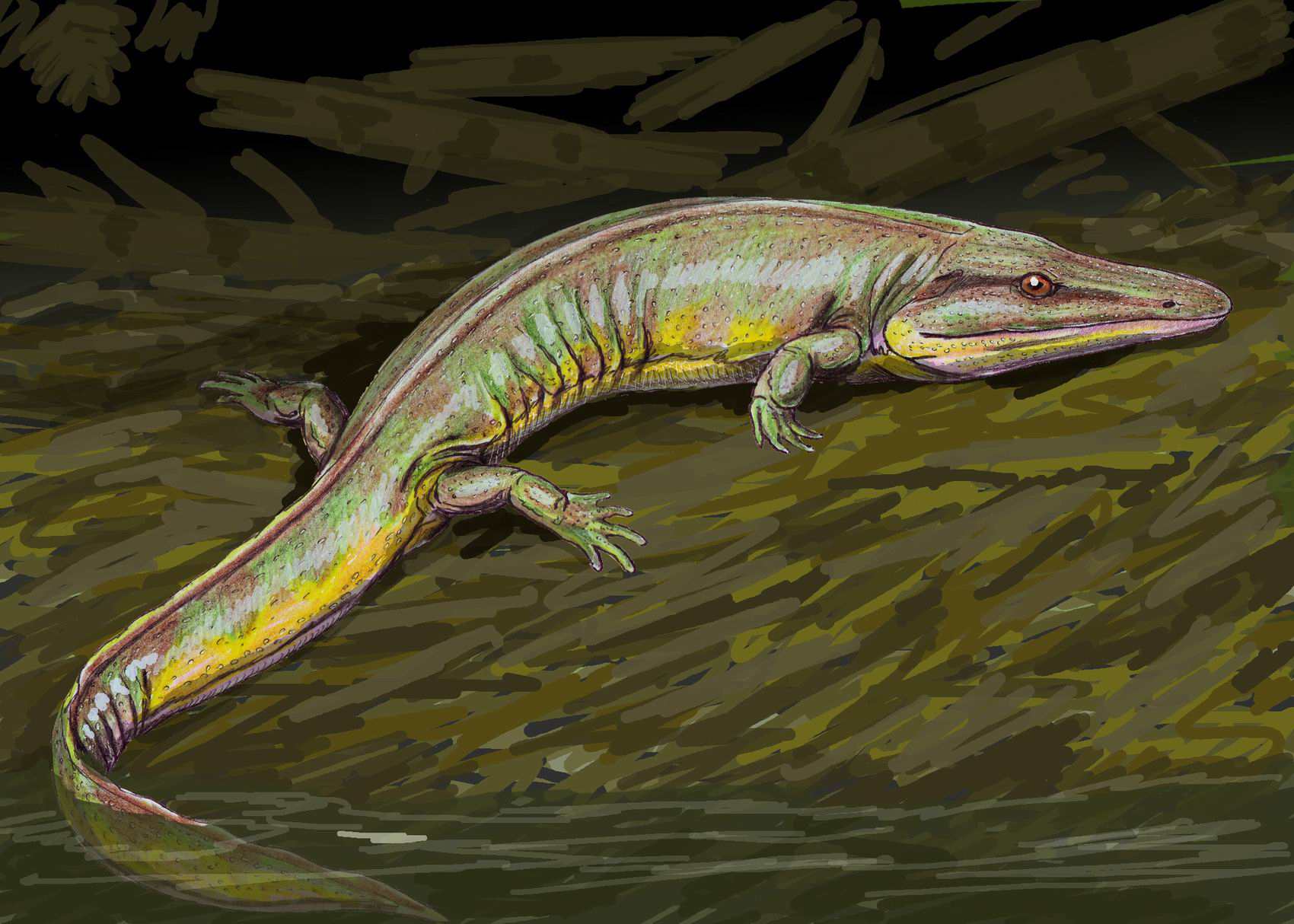
- Restoration of the Carboniferous-Permian amphibian Chenoprosopus
  †Chenoprosopus – type locality for genus
  - †Chenoprosopus milleri – type locality for species
- †Chonetes
  - †Chonetes illinoisensis
  - †Chonetes mesoloba
- †Cleiothyridina
  - †Cleiothyridina hirsuta
  - †Cleiothyridina pilularis
- †Collemataria
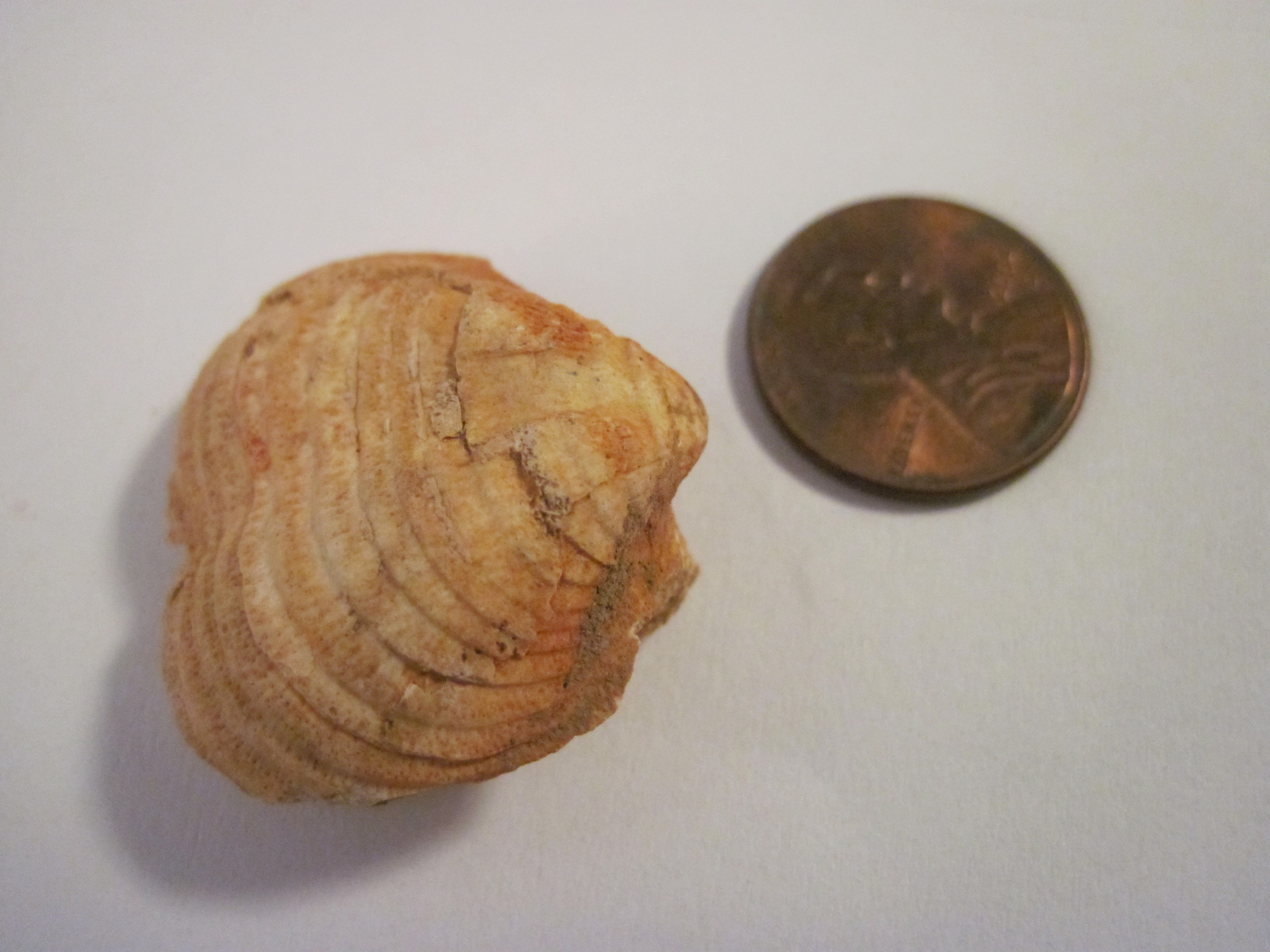
- Fossilized shell of the Late Devonian-Permian brachiopod Composita
  †Composita
  - †Composita affinis
  - †Composita bucculenta
  - †Composita cracens
  - †Composita emarginata
  - †Composita ovata
  - †Composita subtilita
- †Conjunctio – type locality for genus
  - †Conjunctio multidens – type locality for species
- †Cordaites
- †Crania
- †Ctenacanthus – or unidentified comparable form
- †Cyclopteris
- †Cypricardinia
- †Cyptendoceras – tentative report
- †Cystodictya
- †Cystothalamia
  - †Cystothalamia nodulifera
- †Dakeoceras
- †Desmatodon
- †Diadectes
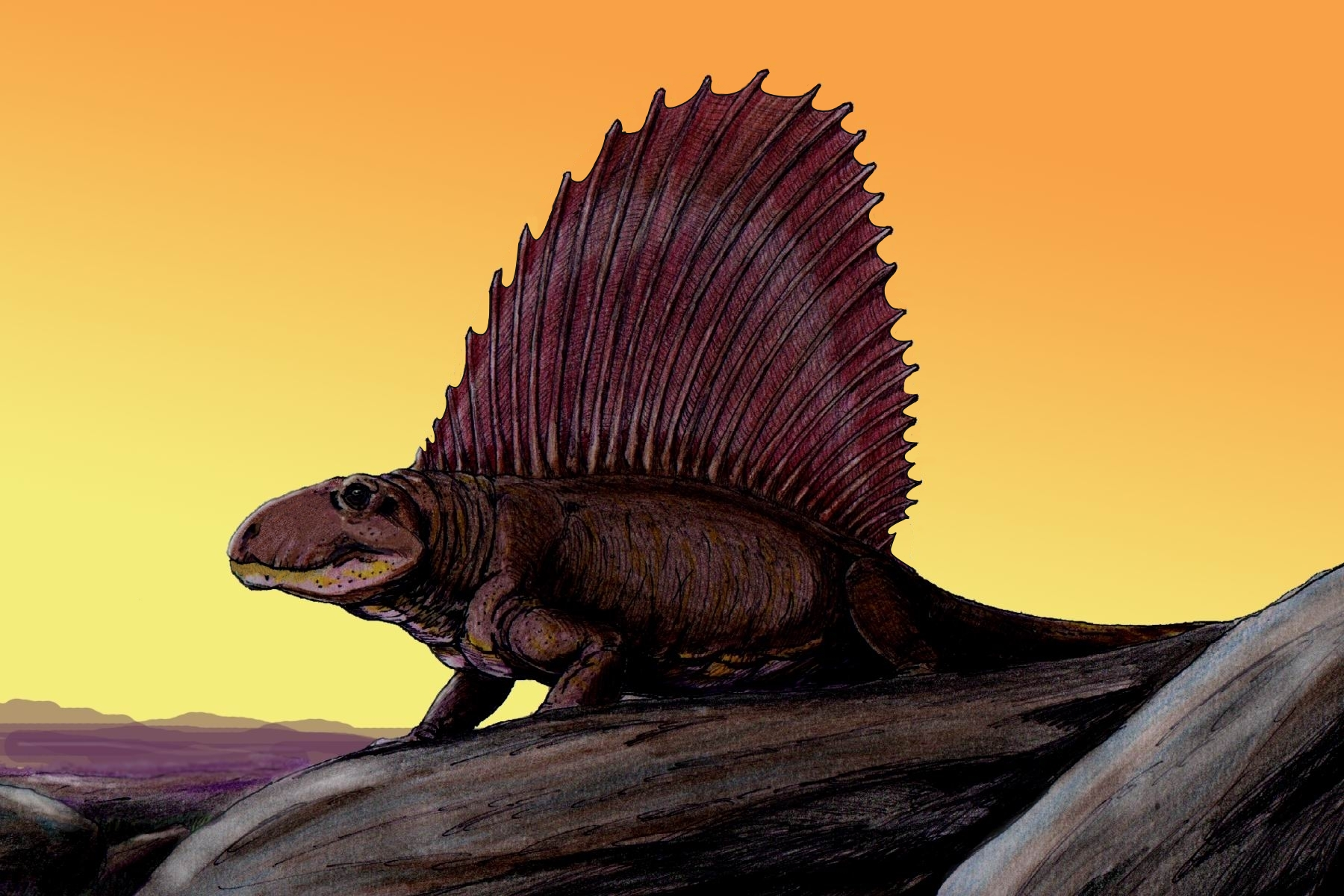
- Life restoration of the Permian synapsid (mammal precursor) Dimetrodon
  †Dimetrodon
  - †Dimetrodon occidentalis – type locality for species
- †Diplocaulus
- †Domatoceras
- †Earlandia
- †Echinaria
- †Edaphosaurus
  - †Edaphosaurus novomexicanus – type locality for species
- †Edmondia
- †Eldredgeops
  - †Eldredgeops rana
- †Ellesmeroceras
- †Endorioceras – type locality for genus
- Eocaudina
- †Error
- †Eryops
- †Euomphalus
- †Fenestella
- †Fusulina
- †Girvanella
- †Glenopteris – or unidentified comparable form
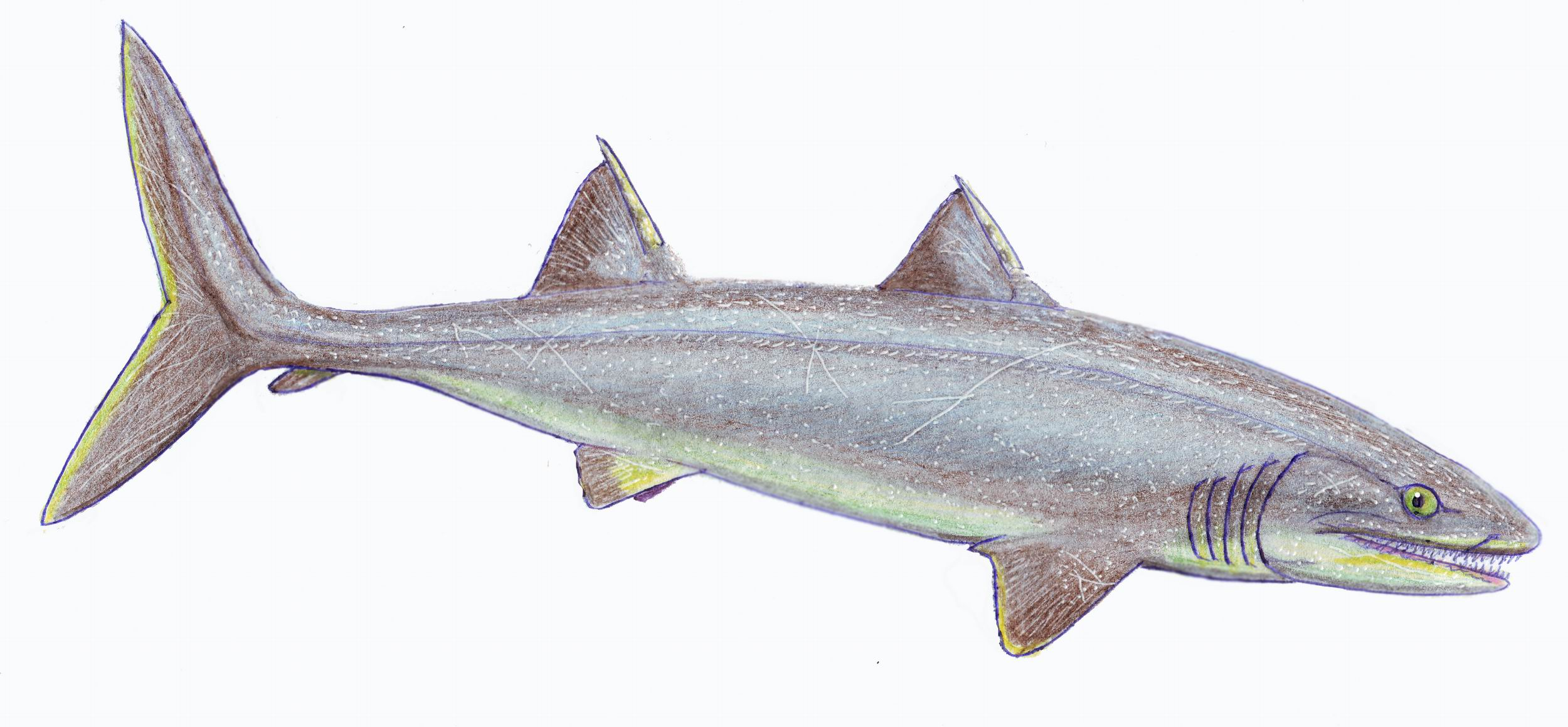
- Life restoration of the Carboniferous shark Glikmanius
  †Glikmanius
  - †Glikmanius occidentalis
- †Gnathorhiza
- †Grewingkia
- †Guadalupia
- †Hedstroemia
- †Hexagonaria
- †Isogramma
- †Komia
- †Lambeoceras
- †Lepidodendron
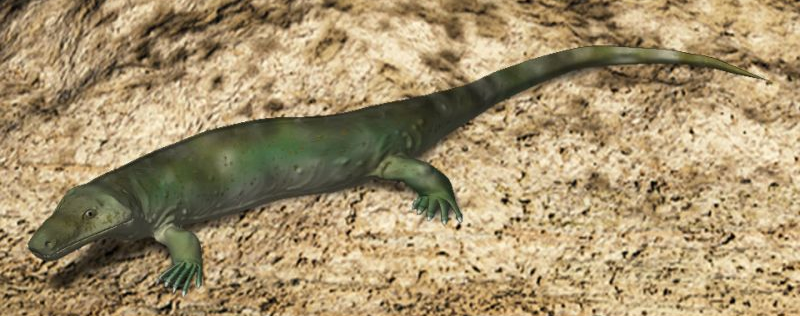
- Life restoration of the Permian reptile precursor Limnoscelis
  †Limnoscelis
  - †Limnoscelis paludis
- †Lingula
- †Lioestheria – or unidentified comparable form
- †Liroceras
- Lithophaga
- †Lloydia
- † Madera – type locality for genus
- †Mariceras
- †Martinia
- †Metabaltoceras
- †Metacoceras
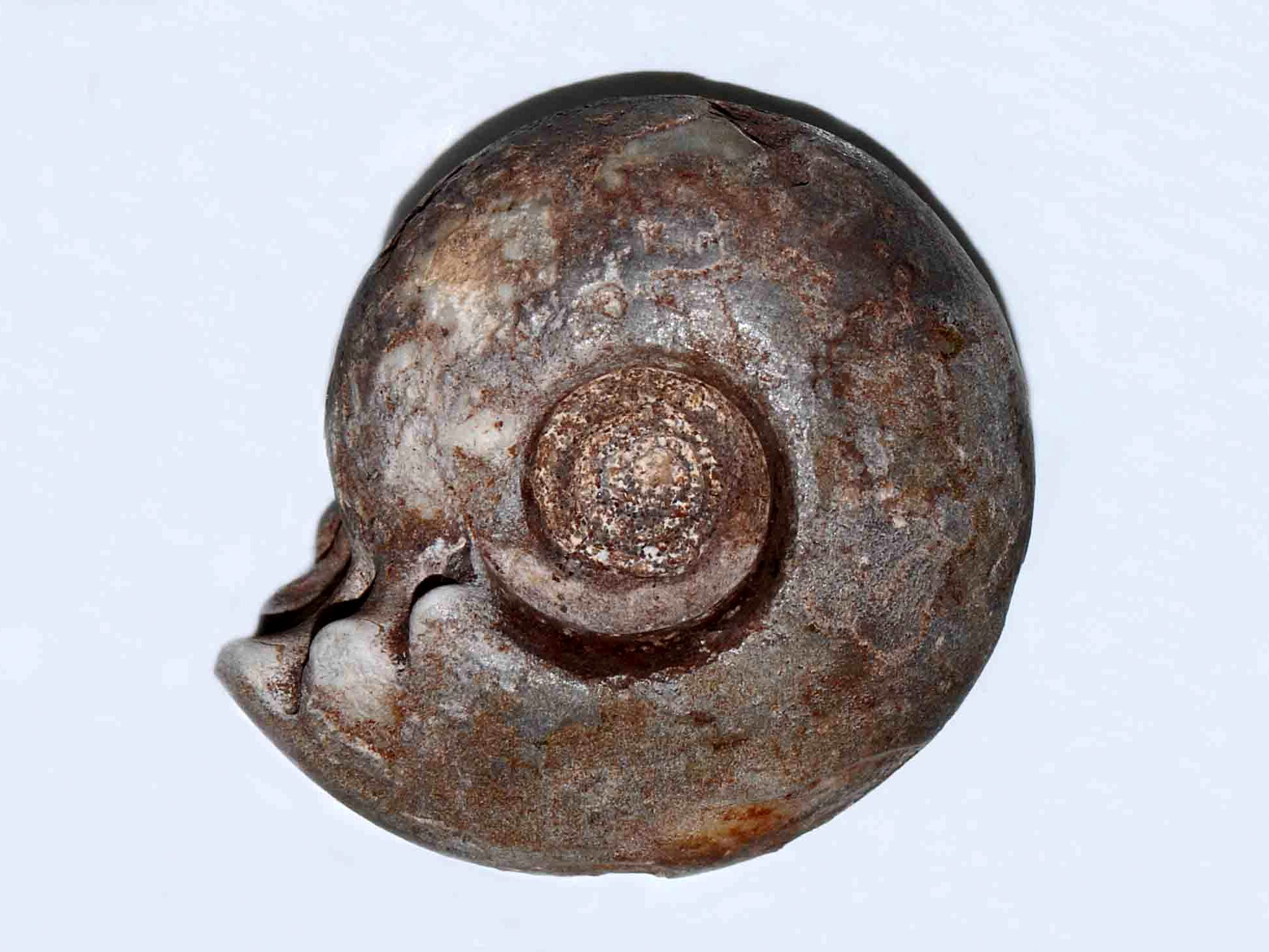
- Fossilized shell of the Permian ammonoid cephalopod Metalegoceras
  †Metalegoceras
- †Murchisonia
- †Naticopsis
  - †Naticopsis judithae – or unidentified related form
  - †Naticopsis scintilla
- †Neospirifer
  - †Neospirifer cameratus
  - †Neospirifer dunbari – or unidentified comparable form
  - †Neospirifer goreii
  - †Neospirifer latus – or unidentified comparable form
  - †Neospirifer triplicatus
- †Neuropteris
  - †Neuropteris ovata
  - †Neuropteris scheuchzeri
- †Nitosaurus – type locality for genus
- Nucula – report made of unidentified related form or using admittedly obsolete nomenclature
- †Oedaleops – type locality for genus
  - †Oedaleops campi – type locality for species
- †Onchiodon – tentative report
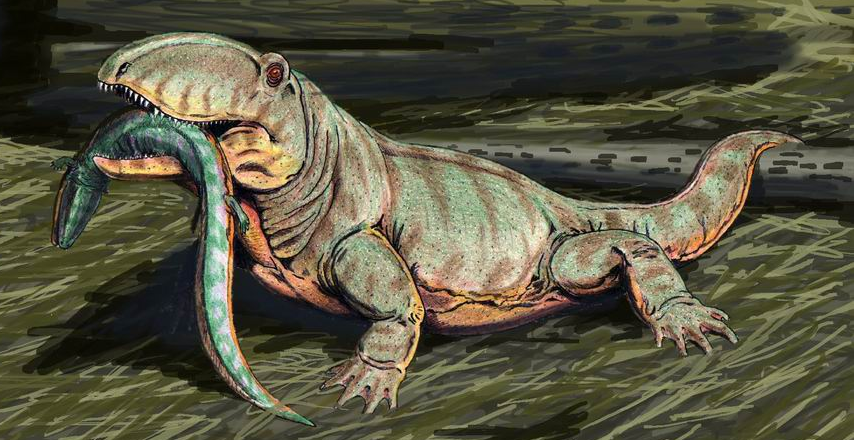
- Life restoration of the Carboniferous-Permian synapsid (mammal precursor) Ophiacodon
  †Ophiacodon – type locality for genus
  - †Ophiacodon mirus – type locality for species
  - †Ophiacodon navajovicus – type locality for species
- †Ozarkodina
- †Pachyphyllum
- †Palmatolepis
- †Paraceltites
- †Paraschwagerina
- †Pecopteris
  - †Pecopteris feminaeformis
- †Pentremites
- †Petalodus
- †Phillipsia
- †Plaesiomys
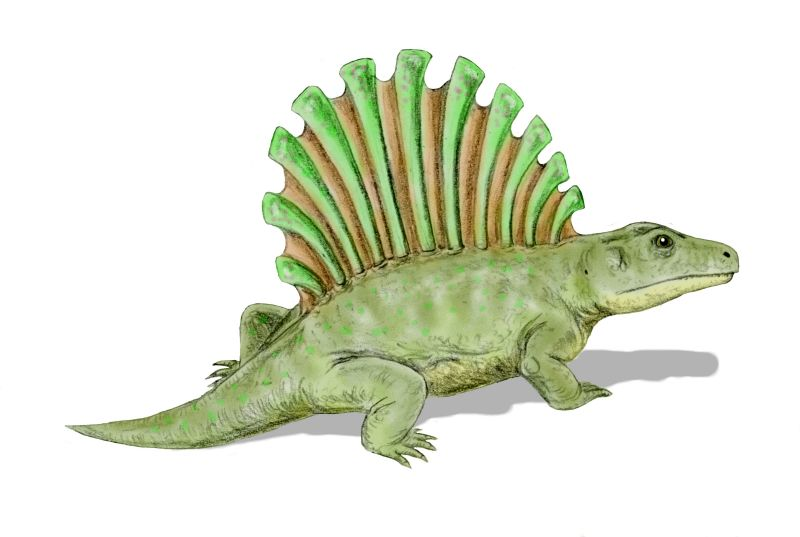
- Life restoration of the Carboniferous-Permian sail-backed amphibian Platyhystrix
  †Platyhystrix
  - †Platyhystrix rugosus
- †Platystrophia
- †Plicochonetes – tentative report
- †Polygnathus
- †Posidonia – tentative report
- †Prodentalium
- †Rhiodenticulatus – type locality for genus
  - †Rhiodenticulatus heatoni – type locality for species
- †Rhynchonella – report made of unidentified related form or using admittedly obsolete nomenclature
- †Rioceras – type locality for genus
- †Ruthiromia – type locality for genus
  - †Ruthiromia elcobriensis – type locality for species
- †Sallya
- †Samaropsis
- †Sandia
- †Schwagerina
- †Sigillaria
  - †Sigillaria brardii
- Solemya
- †Solenopora
- †Spathognathodus
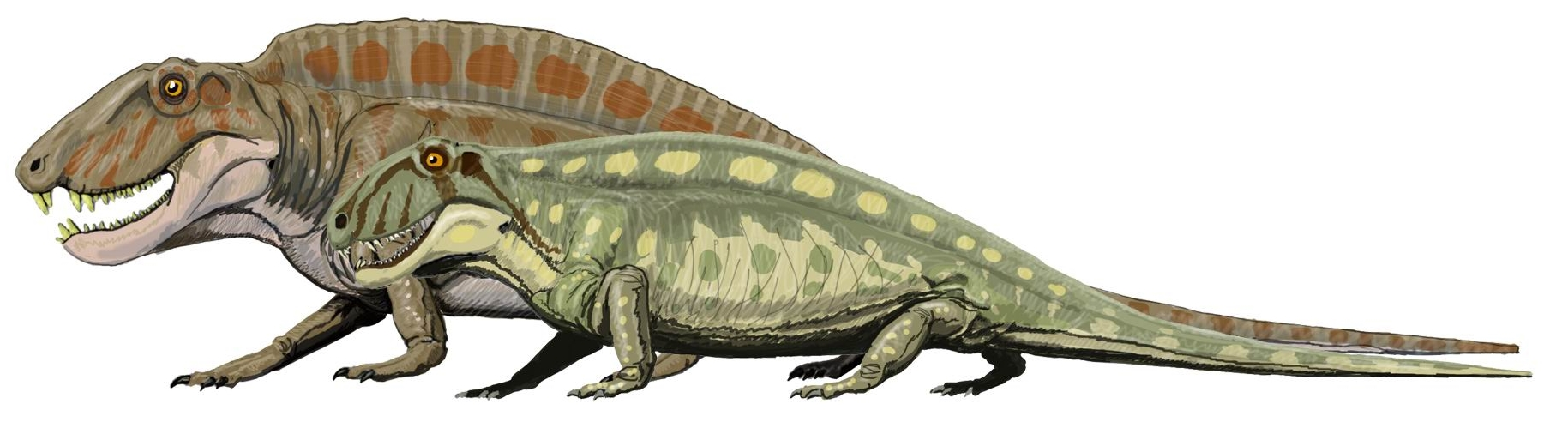
- S. ferox and the larger S. ferocior
  Sphenacodon – type locality for genus
  - †Sphenacodon ferox – type locality for species
- †Sphenophyllum
  - †Sphenophyllum cuneifolium
- †Sphenopteris
- †Spirifer
  - †Spirifer grimesi
  - †Spirifer rockymontanus
- Spirorbis
- †Stearoceras
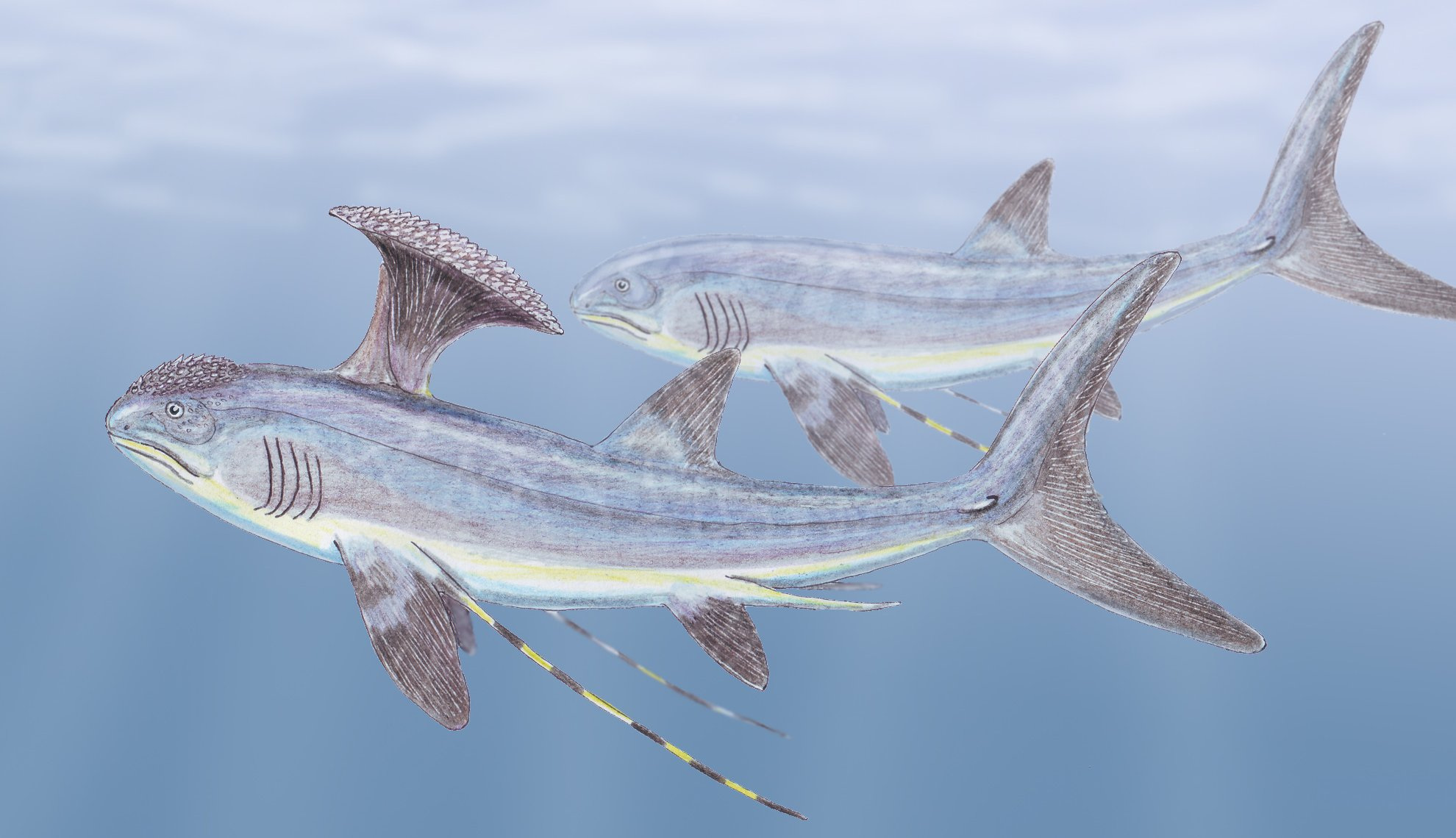
- Life restorations of a male (foreground) and female (background) of the Late Devonian-Carboniferous Chimaera relative Stethacanthus
  †Stethacanthus
- †Streptognathodus
- †Strophomena
  - †Strophomena neglecta
- †Syringopora
- †Tainoceras
- †Tetrataxis
- Textularia
- †Trimerorhachis
- †Walchia
- †Wilkingia
- †Worthenia
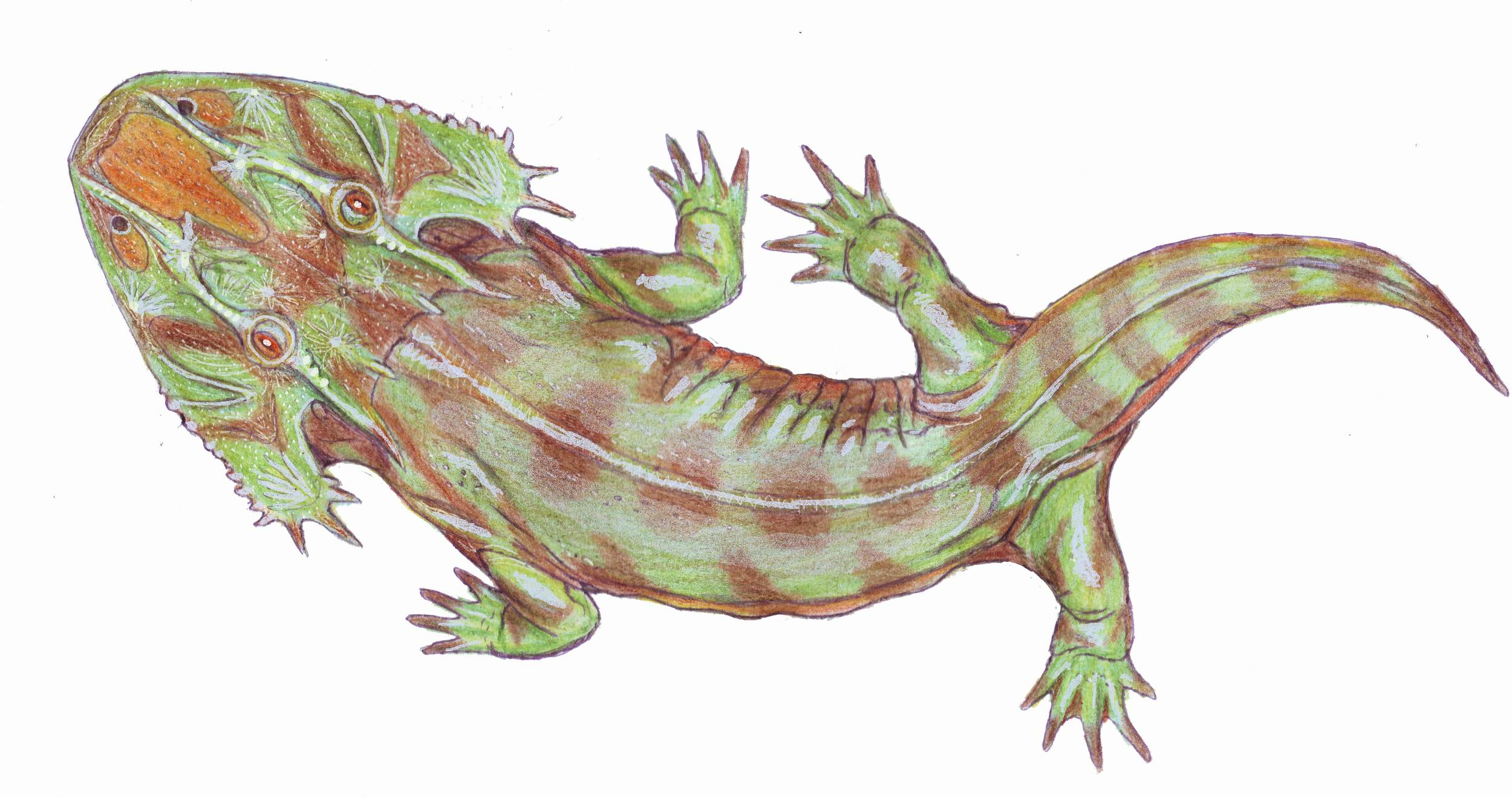
- Life restoration of the Permian amphibian Zatrachys
  †Zatrachys
- †Zia

== Mesozoic ==
- †Acanthoceras
  - †Acanthoceras amphibolum
- Acipenser
- †Adocus
- †Ahshislepelta – type locality for genus
  - †Ahshislepelta minor – type locality for species
- Diagram illustrating the sizes of three specimens of the Late Cretaceous long-necked dinosaur Alamosaurus, with an anachronistic human to scale
  †Alamosaurus – type locality for genus
  - †Alamosaurus sanjuanensis – type locality for species
- †Albanerpeton
  - †Albanerpeton nexuosus
- †Albertosaurus – tentative report
- †Allocrioceras
- †Allosaurus
- †Alphadon
  - †Alphadon halleyi
  - †Alphadon marshi
- †Amblydactylus
- Amia
- †Anasazisaurus – type locality for genus
  - †Anasazisaurus horneri – type locality for species
- Anatina
- †Anchisauripus
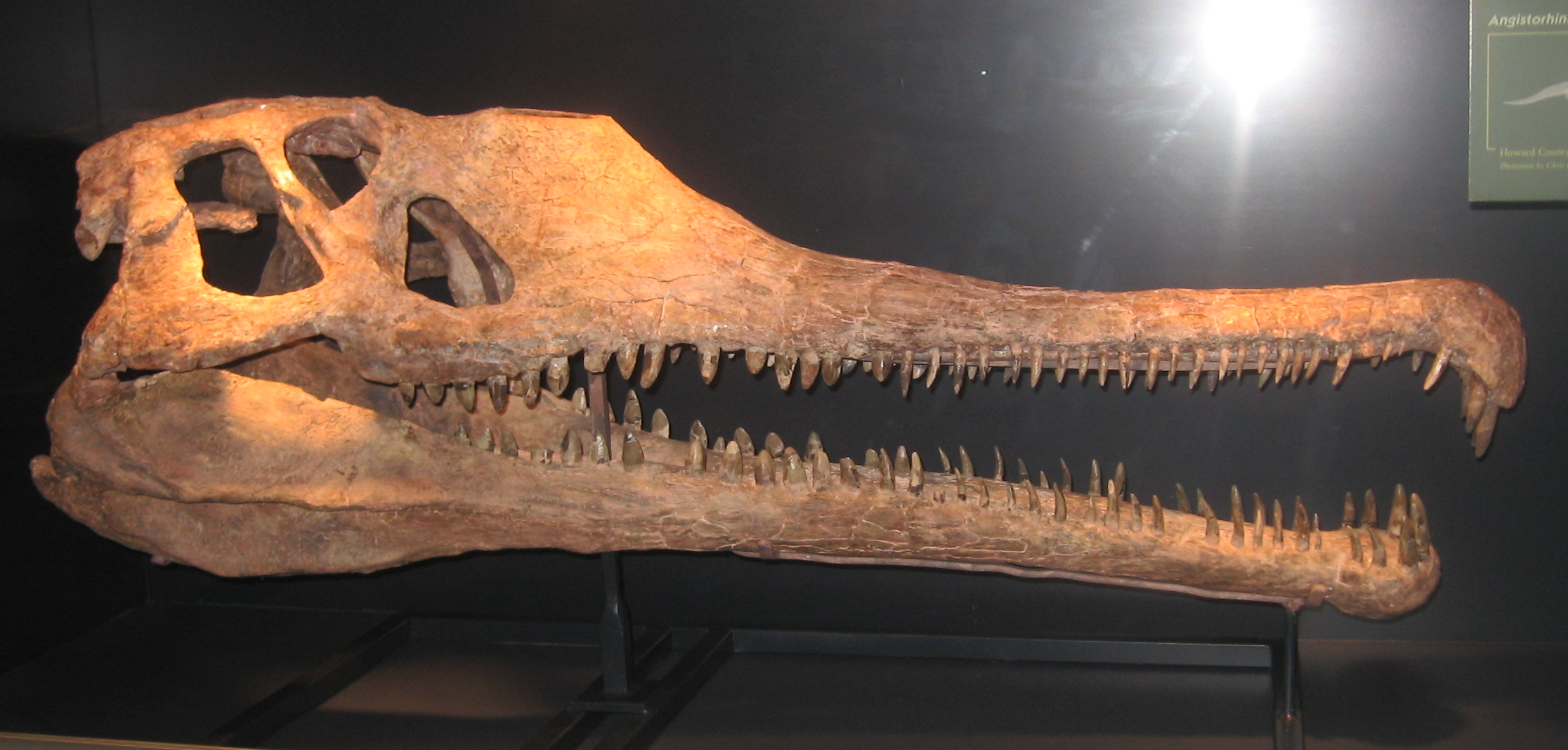
- Fossilized skull of the Late Triassic phytosaur Angistorhinus
  †Angistorhinus
- †Anisoceras
- †Ankylosaurus – tentative report
- †Anomia
- †Anomoepus – tentative report
- †Anomotodon
- †Apachesaurus
  - †Apachesaurus gregorii
- †Apachesuchus – type locality for genus
- †Apatopus
- †Apatosaurus
- †Araucarioxylon
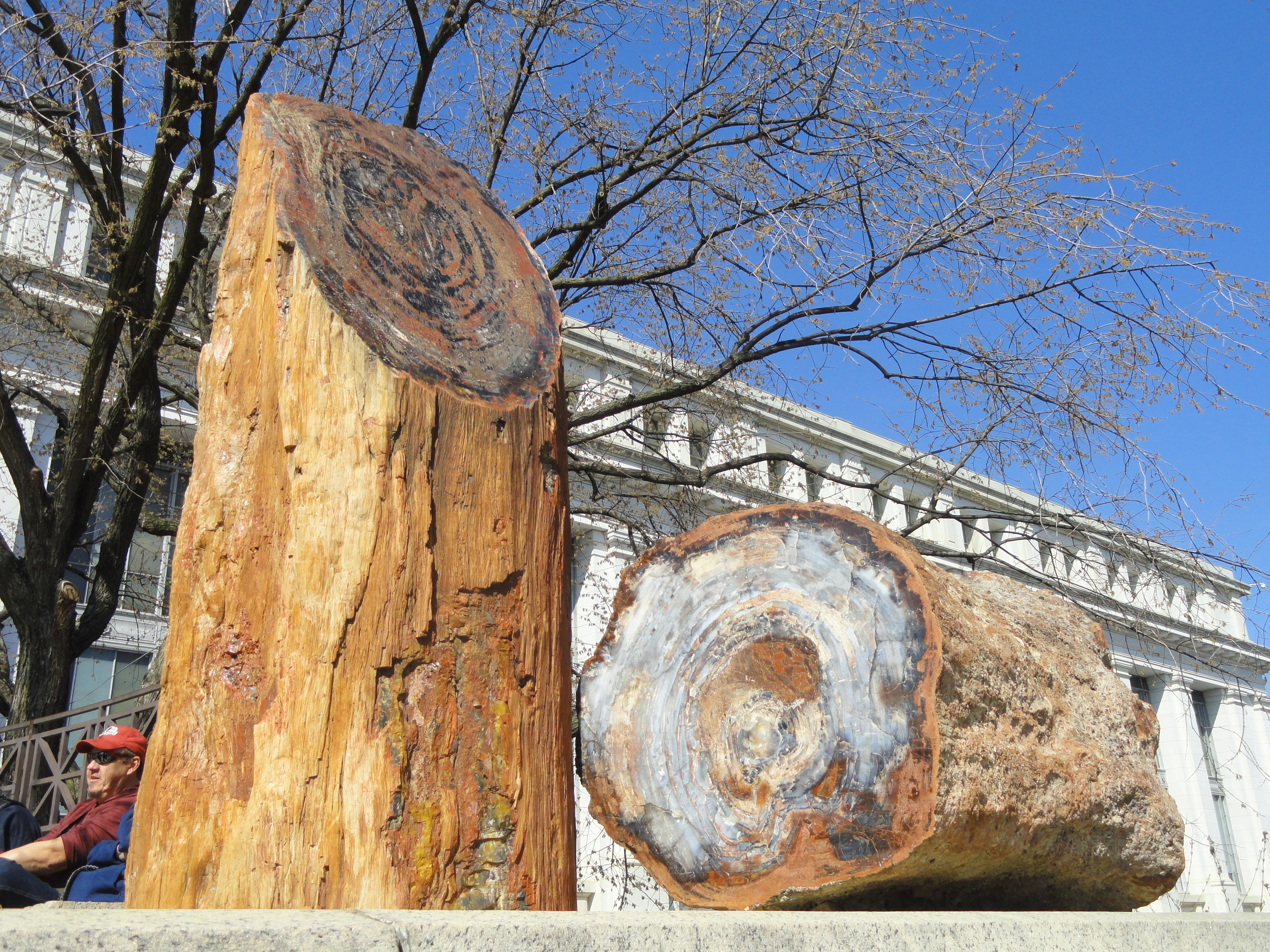
  - Petrified trunk segments of the Permian-Late Triassic conifer tree Araucarioxylon arizonicum
    †Araucarioxylon arizonicum
- †Arganodus
  - †Arganodus dorotheae
- †Arizonasaurus
  - †Arizonasaurus babbitti
- †Asplenium
- Astarte
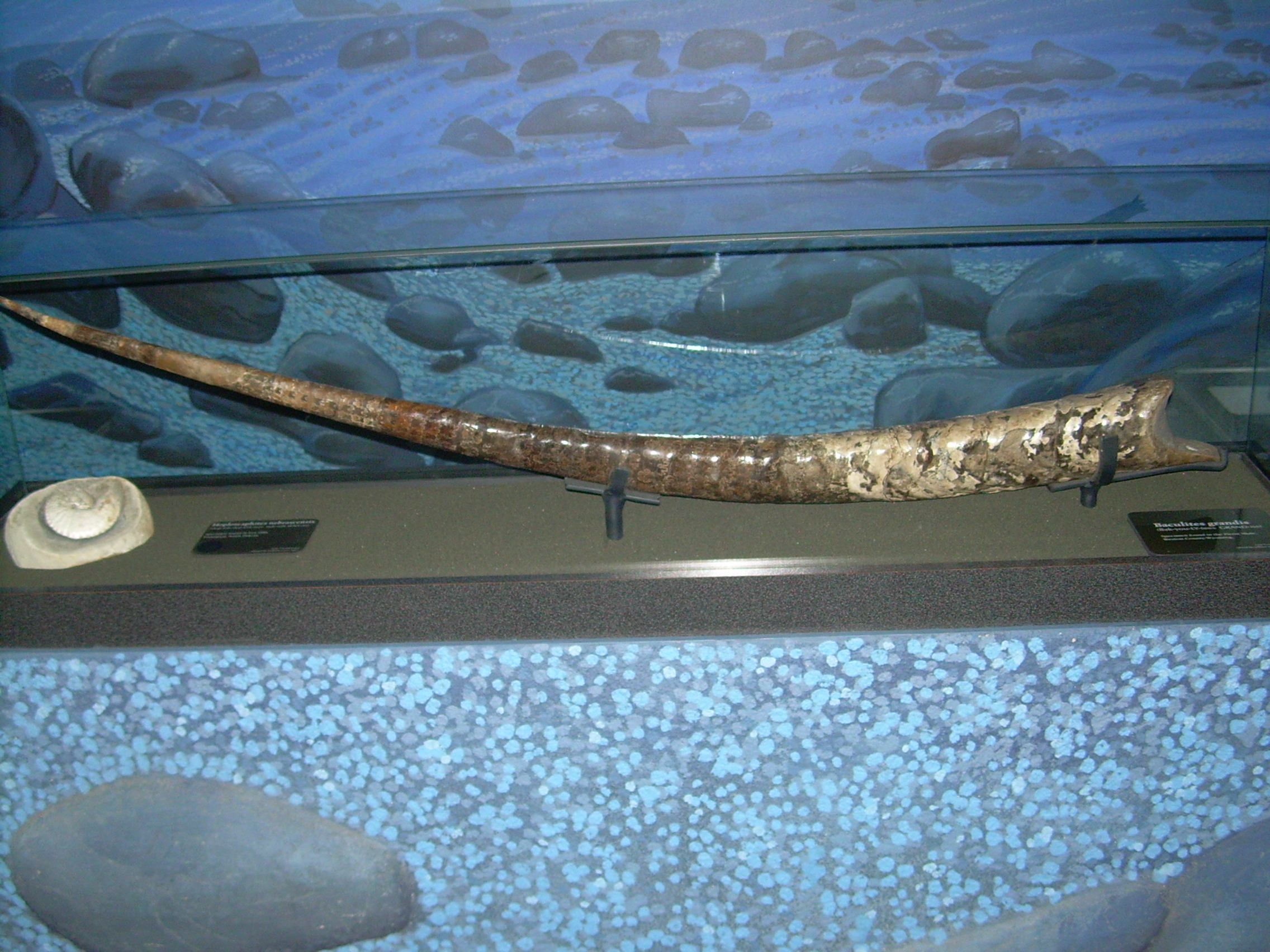
- Fossilized shell of the Late Cretaceous ammonoid cephalopod Baculites
  †Baculites
  - †Baculites asper
  - †Baculites asperiformis – or unidentified comparable form
  - †Baculites codyensis
  - †Baculites gregoryensis
  - †Baculites haresi
  - †Baculites maclearni
  - †Baculites obtusus – or unidentified comparable form
  - †Baculites perplexus
  - †Baculites pseudovatus
  - †Baculites rugosus
  - †Baculites scotti – or unidentified related form
  - †Baculites thomi
  - †Baculites yokoyamai
- †Baiera
- †Basilemys
  - †Basilemys gaffneyi – type locality for species
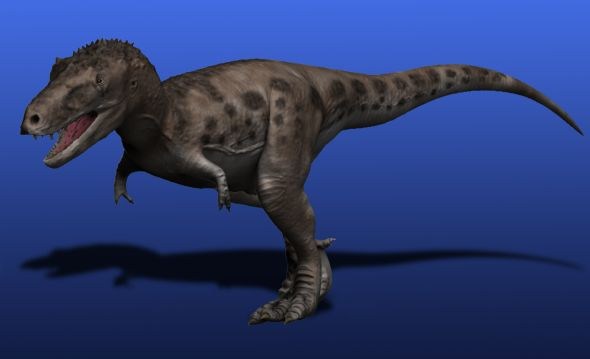
- Restoration of the Late Cretaceous tyrannosaur Bistahieversor
  †Bistahieversor
  - †Bistahieversor sealeyi
- †Brachychampsa
  - †Brachychampsa montana
  - †Brachychampsa sealeyi – type locality for species
- †Brachyphyllum
- †Buettneria
- Cadulus
- Callianassa
- Calliostoma
- †Calycoceras
- †Calyptosuchus – type locality for genus
  - †Calyptosuchus wellesi – type locality for species
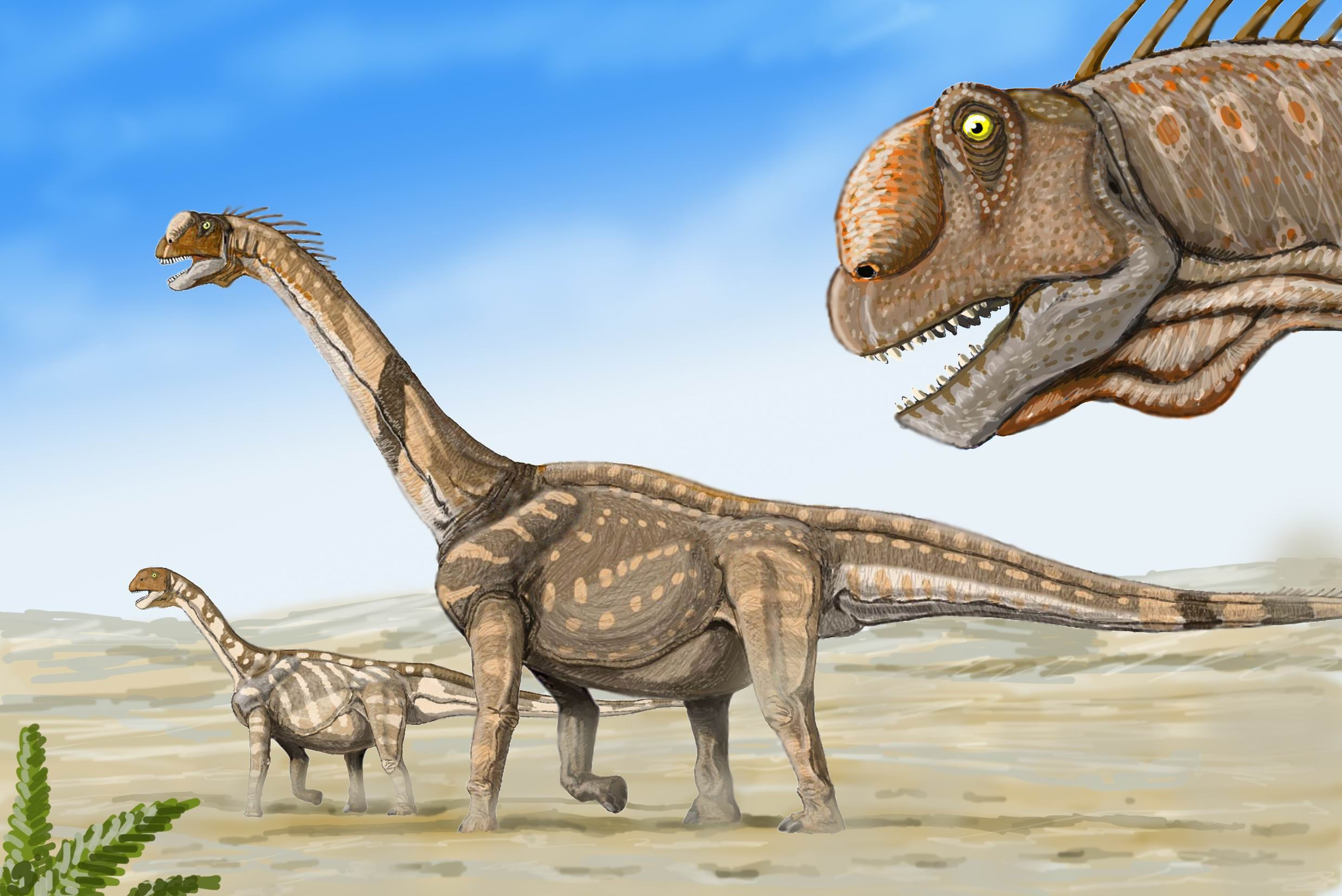
- Life restoration of a herd of the Late Jurassic sauropod dinosaur Camarasaurus
  †Camarasaurus
  - †Camarasaurus grandis
- † Canna – tentative report
- †Caririchnium
- Carota
- Carya
- Caryophyllia
- †Caseosaurus – or unidentified comparable form
- †Ceratops
- Cercidiphyllum
- Cerithiopsis
  - †Chedighaii hutchisoni – type locality for species
- Chiloscyllium
- †Chindesaurus
  - †Chindesaurus bryansmalli
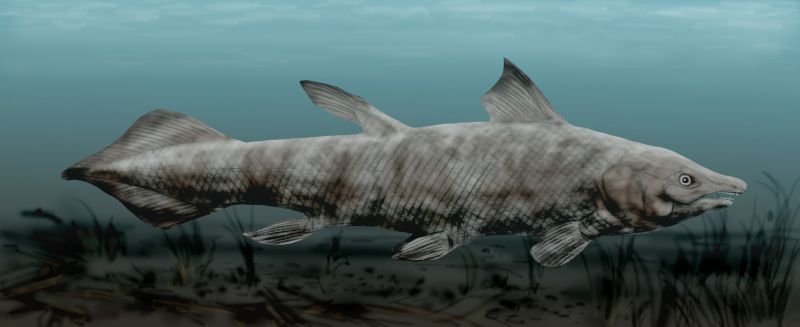
- Restoration of the Late Triassic coelacanth fish Chinlea
  †Chinlea
- †Chirotherium
- †Cibolaites
- †Cimolestes – or unidentified comparable form
- †Cimolodon
  - †Cimolodon electus
- †Cimolomys
- Cinnamomum
- Cissus
- Cladophlebis
- †Coelodus
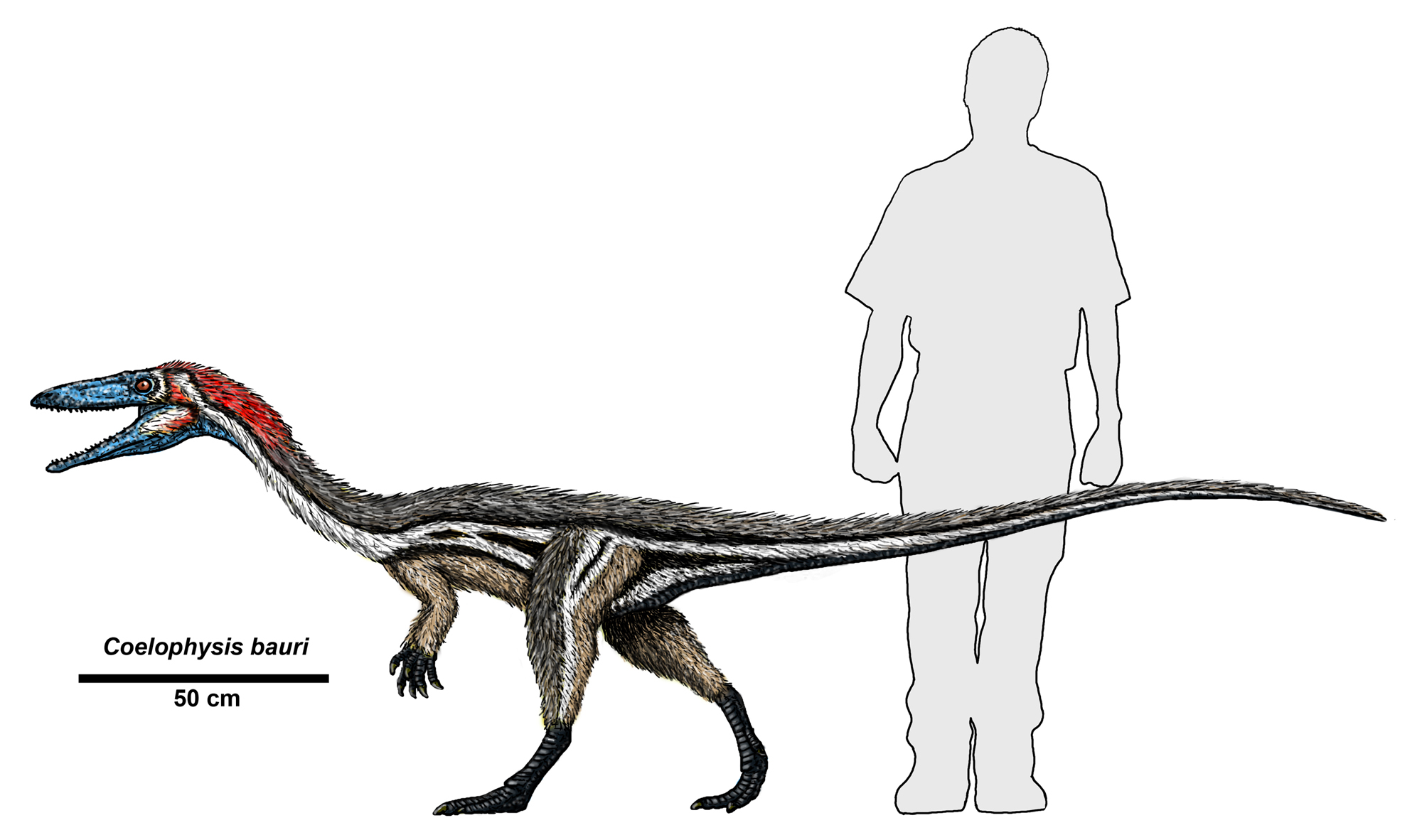
- Life restoration of the Late Triassic-Early Jurassic theropod dinosaur Coelophysis with an anachronistic human to scale
  †Coelophysis
  - †Coelophysis bauri – type locality for species
- †Coelosaurus
  - †Coelosaurus antiquus
- †Coelurosaurichnus
- †Coilopoceras
  - †Coilopoceras colleti
  - †Coilopoceras inflatum – type locality for species
  - †Coilopoceras springeri
- †Collignoniceras
  - †Collignoniceras woollgari
- †Compsemys
- †Coniophis
- †Conlinoceras
- †Continuoolithus
- Corbula
- Crassostrea
- †Cretolamna
  - †Cretolamna appendiculata
- †Crosbysaurus
  - †Crosbysaurus harrisae
- Cucullaea
- †Cunningtoniceras
- †Cymatoceras
- †Daemonosaurus – type locality for genus
  - †Daemonosaurus chauliodus – type locality for species
- †Daspletosaurus
- †Deinodon
  - †Deinodon horridus
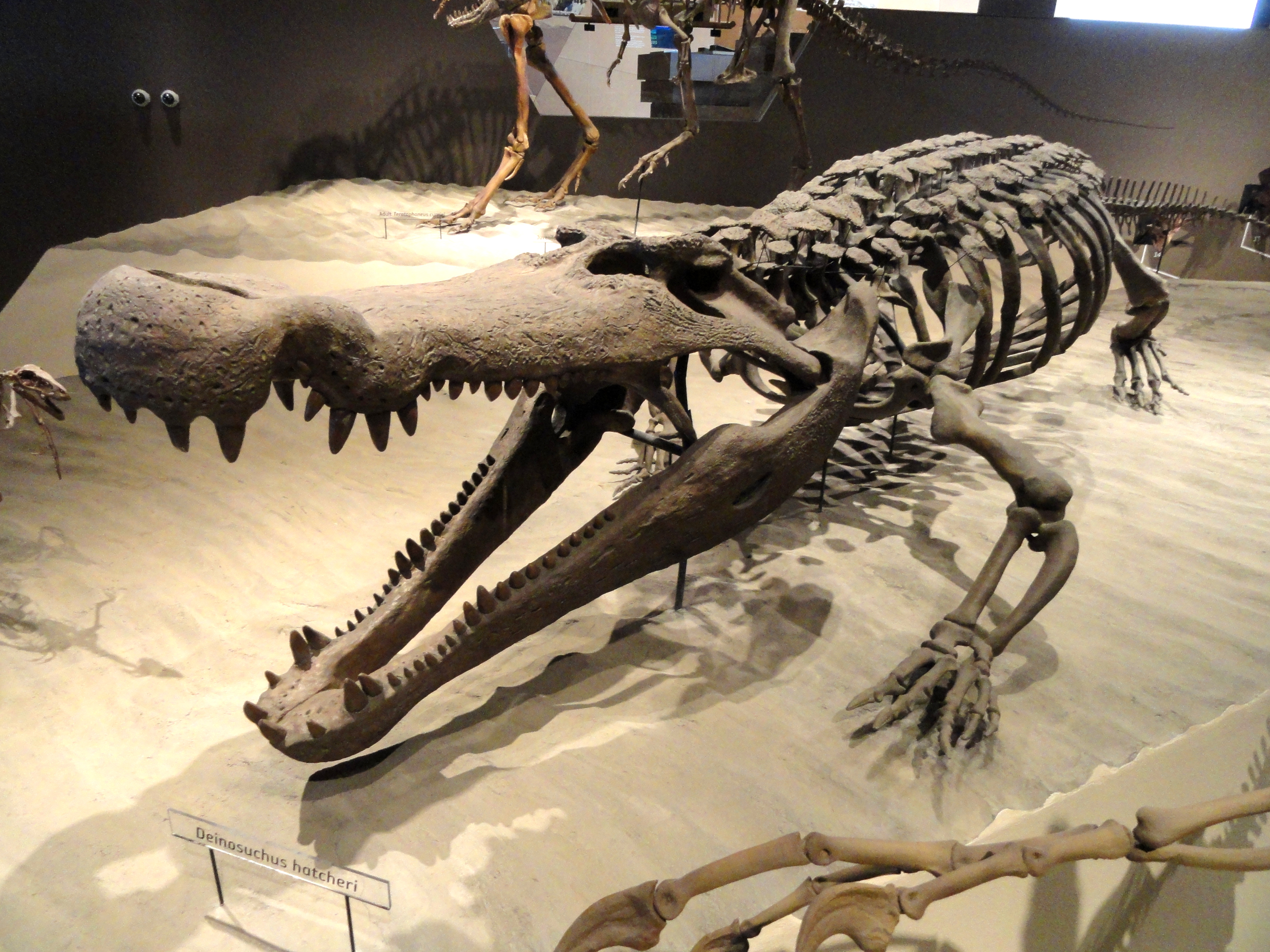
- Mounted fossilized skeleton of the Late Cretaceous Alligator relative Deinosuchus
  †Deinosuchus
  - †Deinosuchus rugosus
- †Denazinemys
  - †Denazinemys nodosa – type locality for species
- †Denazinosuchus
  - †Denazinosuchus kirtlandicus
- Dentalium
- †Desmatosuchus
  - †Desmatosuchus haplocerus
  - †Desmatosuchus spurensis
- †Desmoceras
  - †Desmoceras bassleri
  - †Desmoceras erdmanni
- †Didymoceras
  - †Didymoceras cheyennense
  - †Didymoceras nebrascense
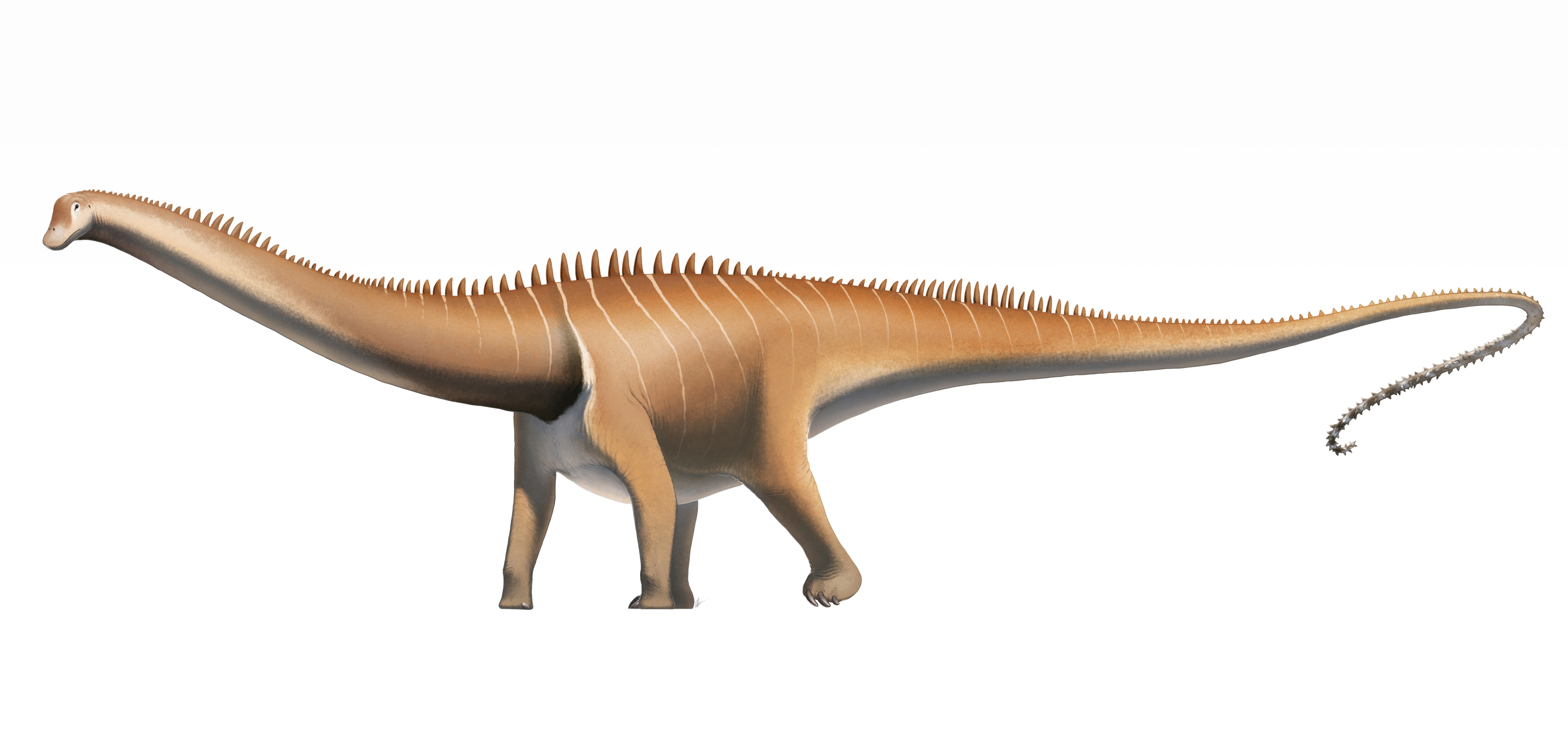
- Life restoration of the Late Jurassic long-necked dinosaur Diplodocus
  †Diplodocus
  - †Diplodocus carnegii
  - †Diplodocus hallorum
- †Dolabrosaurus – type locality for genus
  - †Dolabrosaurus aquatilis – type locality for species
- †Doswellia
  - †Doswellia sixmilensis – type locality for species
- †Drepanosaurus
- †Dromomeron – type locality for genus
  - †Dromomeron romeri – type locality for species
- †Durania
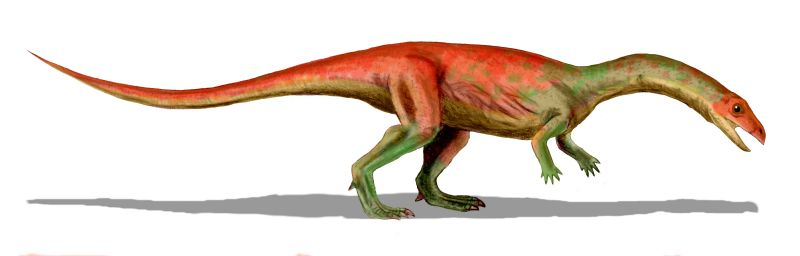
- Restoration of the Late Triassic distant crocodilian relative Effigia
  †Effigia – type locality for genus
  - †Effigia okeeffeae – type locality for species
- †Enchodus
- †Eodelphis – or unidentified comparable form
- †Eopelobates – tentative report
- †Essonodon
  - †Essonodon browni
- †Eubostrychoceras
- †Eucalycoceras
- †Eucoelophysis – type locality for genus
  - †Eucoelophysis baldwini – type locality for species
- †Euomphaloceras
- †Euspira
- †Eutrephoceras
- †Exiteloceras
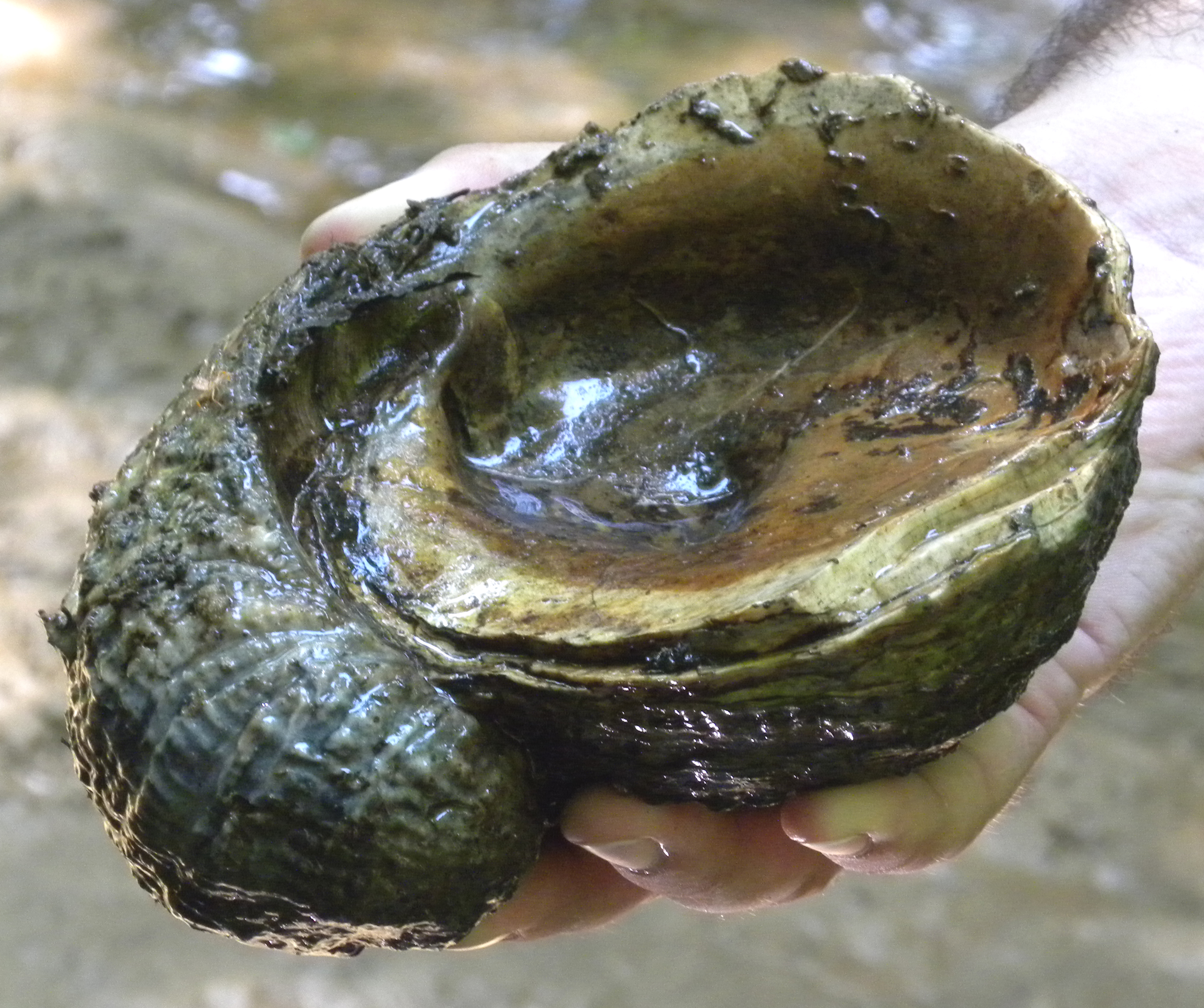
- Interior of a fossilized shell of the Jurassic-Cretaceous foam oyster Exogyra
  †Exogyra
  - †Exogyra acroumbonata – or unidentified related form
  - †Exogyra clarki
  - †Exogyra levis
  - †Exogyra trigeri
  - †Exogyra whitneyi
- †Fagesia
  - †Fagesia superstes
- Fasciolaria – tentative report
- Ficus
- Gerrhonotus – or unidentified comparable form
- Glossus – report made of unidentified related form or using admittedly obsolete nomenclature
- †Glyptodontopelta – type locality for genus
  - †Glyptodontopelta mimus – type locality for species
- †Glyptops
- †Gojirasaurus – type locality for genus
  - †Gojirasaurus quayi – type locality for species
- †Grallator
- †Hemicalypterus
- †Herrickiceras
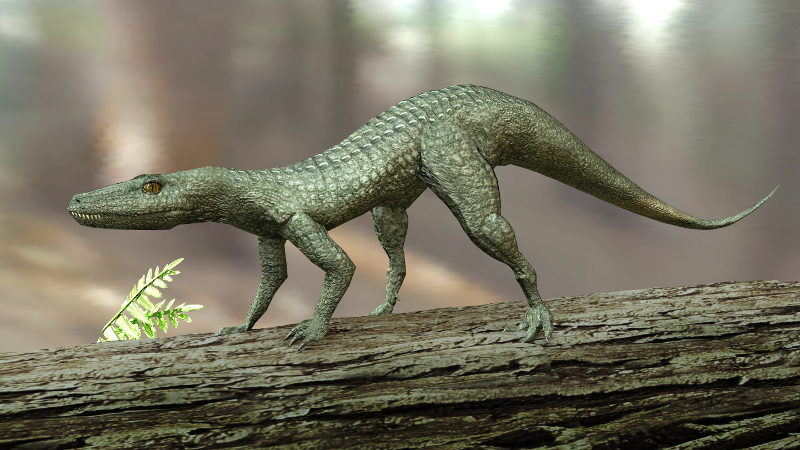
- Life restoration of the Late Triassic crocodile relative Hesperosuchus
  †Hesperosuchus
- †Hoplitoides
  - †Hoplitoides koeneni – or unidentified comparable form
  - †Hoplitoides sandovalensis – type locality for species
  - †Hoplitoides wohltmanni – or unidentified comparable form
- †Hoploscaphites
  - †Hoploscaphites gilli
  - †Hoploscaphites nodosus
- †Hybodus
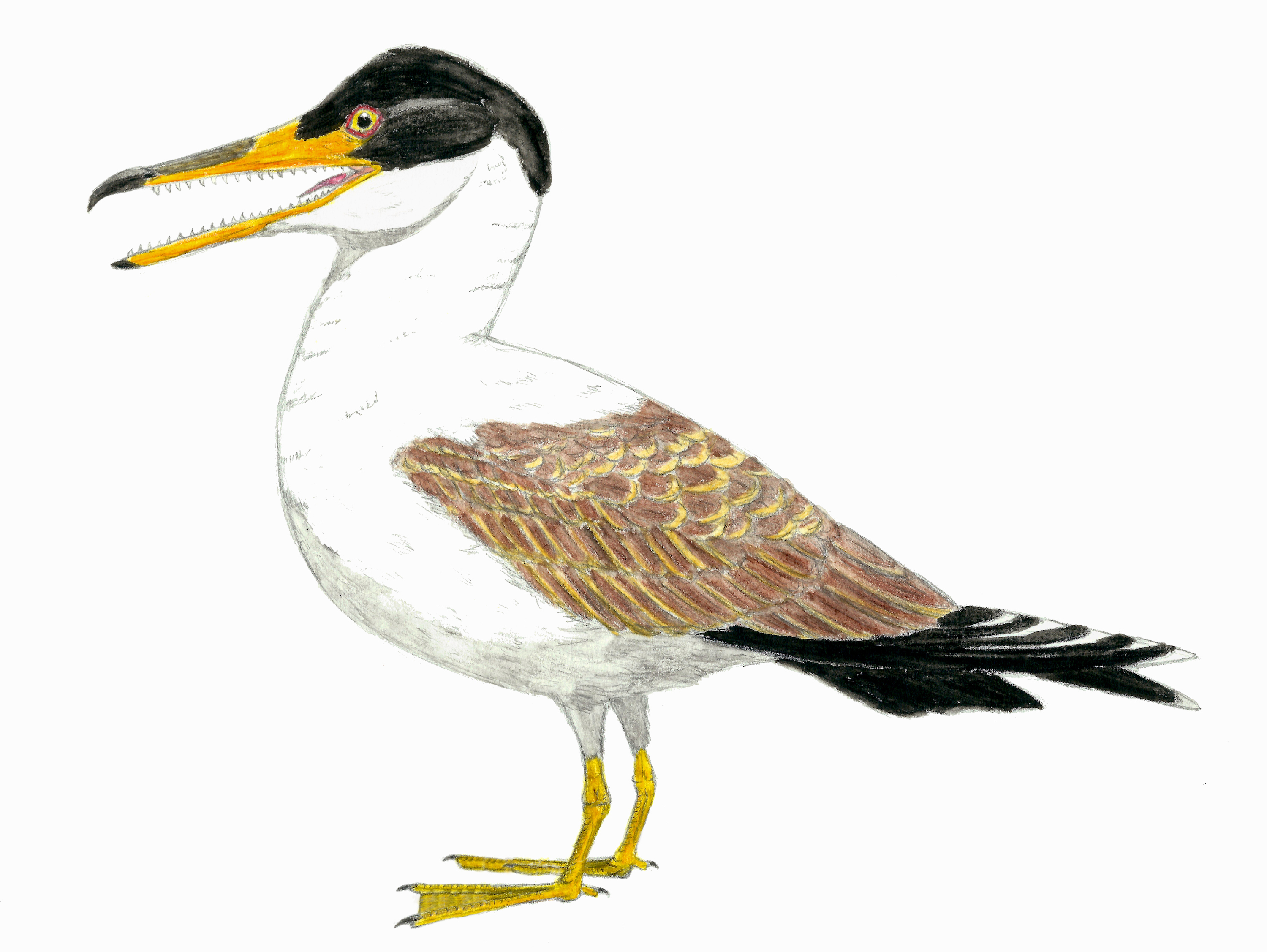
- Restoration of the Late Cretaceous toothed bird Ichthyornis
  †Ichthyornis
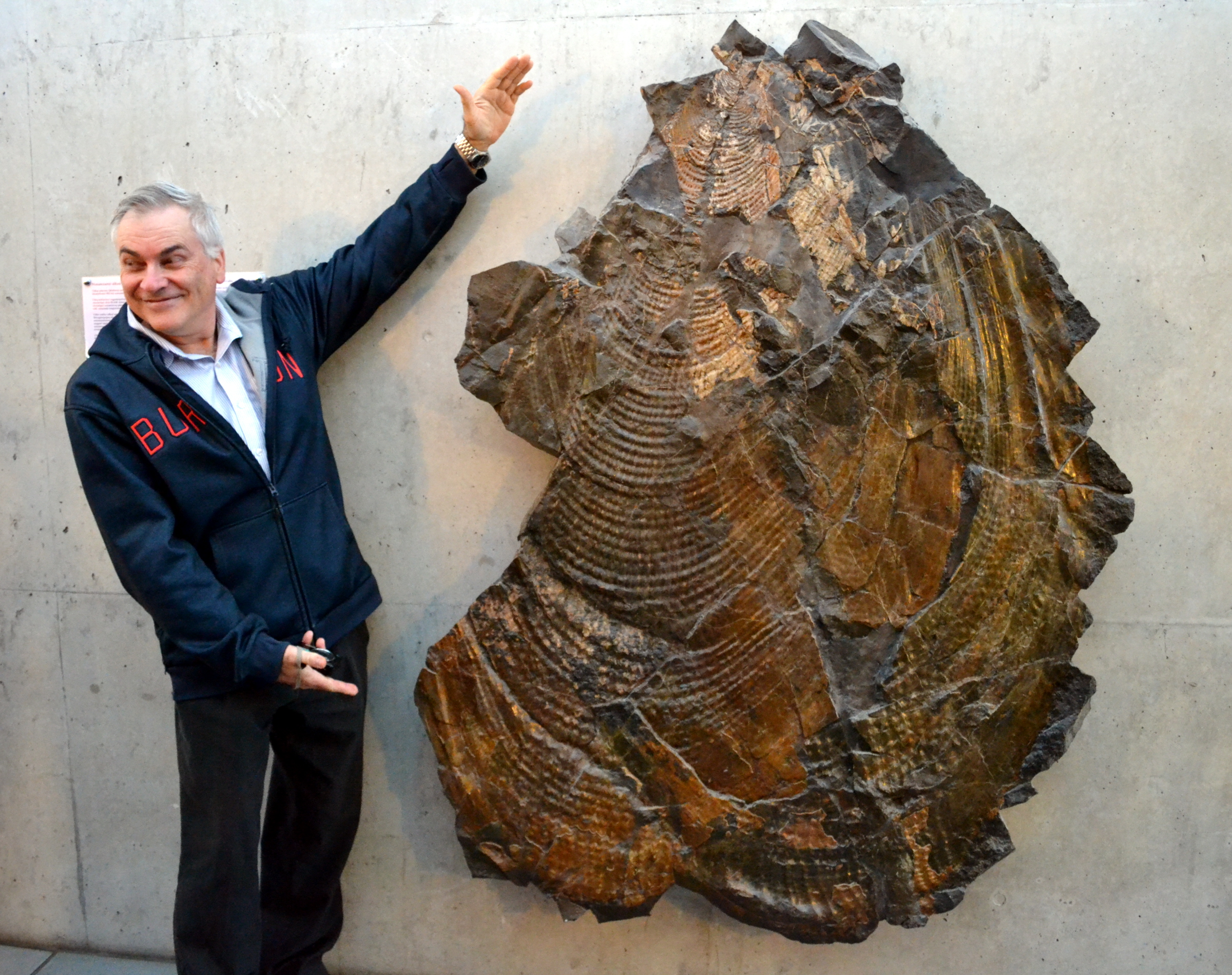
- Fossilized shell of the Early Jurassic-Late Cretaceous marine bivalve Inoceramus with a human indicating its size
  †Inoceramus
  - †Inoceramus arvanus
  - †Inoceramus balticus
  - †Inoceramus bellvuensis
  - †Inoceramus browni
  - †Inoceramus bueltenensis
  - †Inoceramus cordiformis
  - †Inoceramus cuvieri
  - †Inoceramus deformis
  - †Inoceramus dimidius
  - †Inoceramus grandis
  - †Inoceramus howelli
  - †Inoceramus incertus
  - †Inoceramus labiatoidiformis – or unidentified related form
  - †Inoceramus longealatus
  - †Inoceramus lundbreckensis
  - †Inoceramus lundbrekensis
  - †Inoceramus muelleri
  - †Inoceramus mytiloidiformis
  - †Inoceramus parvus
  - †Inoceramus pertenuis – or unidentified related form
  - †Inoceramus pictus
  - †Inoceramus proximus – or unidentified related form
  - †Inoceramus robertsoni – type locality for species
  - †Inoceramus sagensis
  - †Inoceramus schloenbachi
  - †Inoceramus simpsoni
  - †Inoceramus soukupi – or unidentified related form
  - †Inoceramus subcompressus
  - †Inoceramus turgidus – or unidentified related form
  - †Inoceramus undabundus
  - †Inoceramus vanuxemi
- †Ischyrhiza
  - †Ischyrhiza avonicola
  - †Ischyrhiza mira
  - †Ischyrhiza schneideri – or unidentified comparable form
- †Isopodichnus
- Isurus
- †Jeyawati – type locality for genus
  - †Jeyawati rugoculus – type locality for species
- †Kamerunoceras
- †Kimbetohia – or unidentified comparable form
- †Koskinonodon
- †Kouphichnium
- †Kritosaurus – type locality for genus
  - †Kritosaurus navajovius – type locality for species
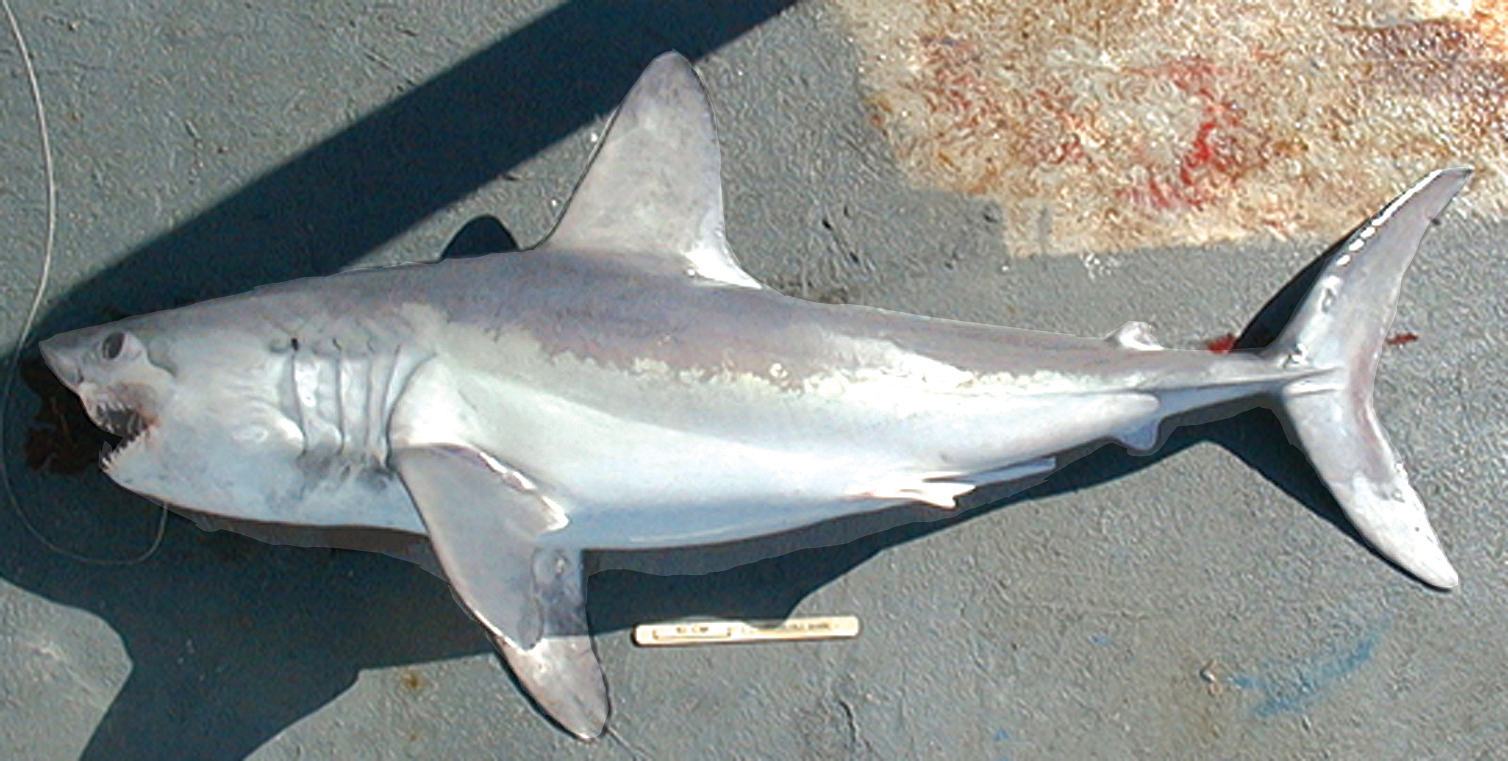
- A modern Lamna mackerel shark
  Lamna
- Lepisosteus
- †Leptalestes
  - †Leptalestes cooki
  - †Leptalestes prokrejcii – type locality for species
- Lima
- †Linearis – tentative report
- Linuparus
- †Lissodus
- †Lonchidion
- Lopha
- †Lucianosaurus – type locality for genus
  - †Lucianosaurus wildi – type locality for species
- † Lucina
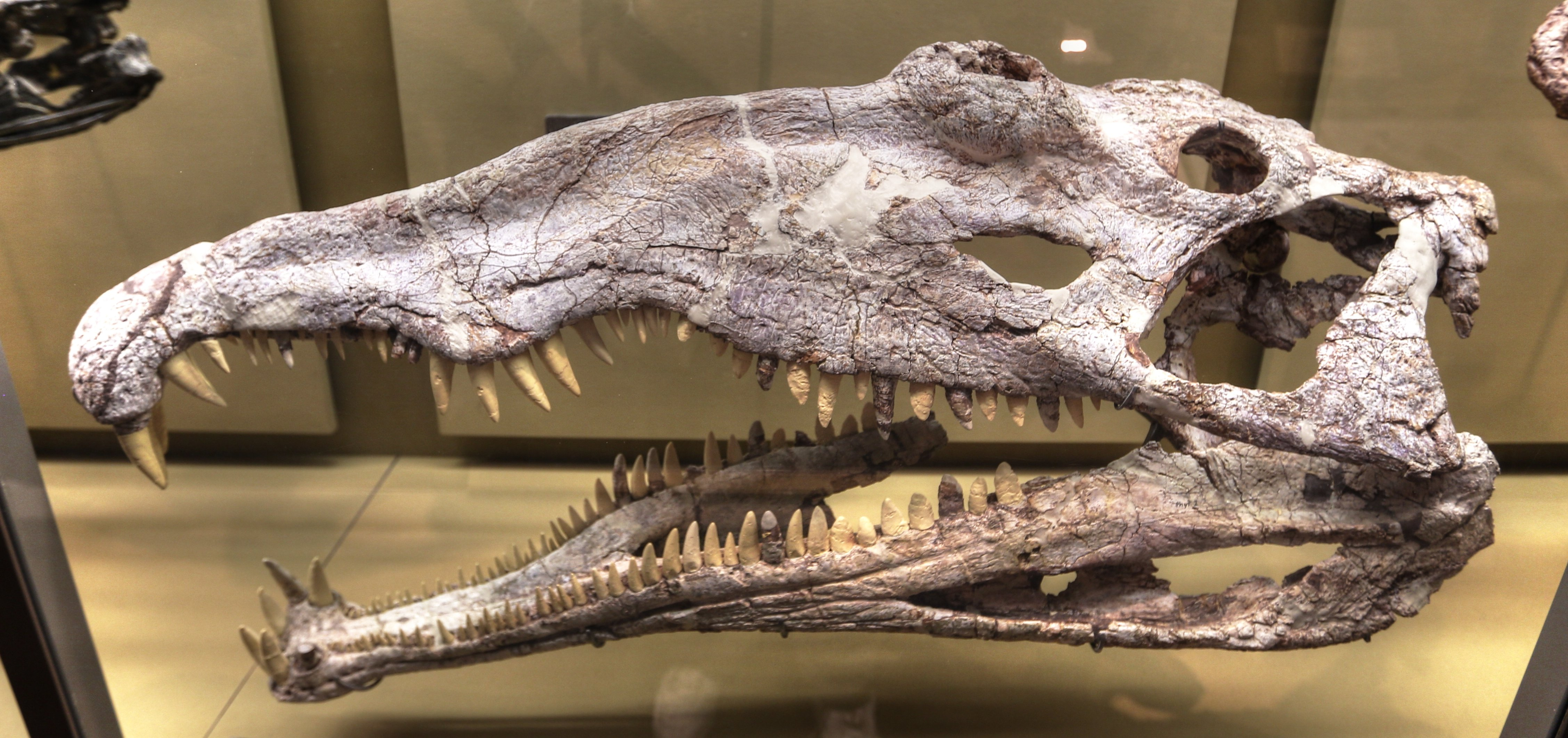
- Fossilized skull of the Late Triassic phytosaur Machaeroprosopus
  †Machaeroprosopus
  - †Machaeroprosopus bucercos
  - †Machaeroprosopus buceros – type locality for species
  - †Machaeroprosopus pristinus
- †Magnoavipes
- Magnolia
- †Mammites
- †Mantelliceras
- †Megalosauripus
- †Melvius
  - †Melvius chauliodous
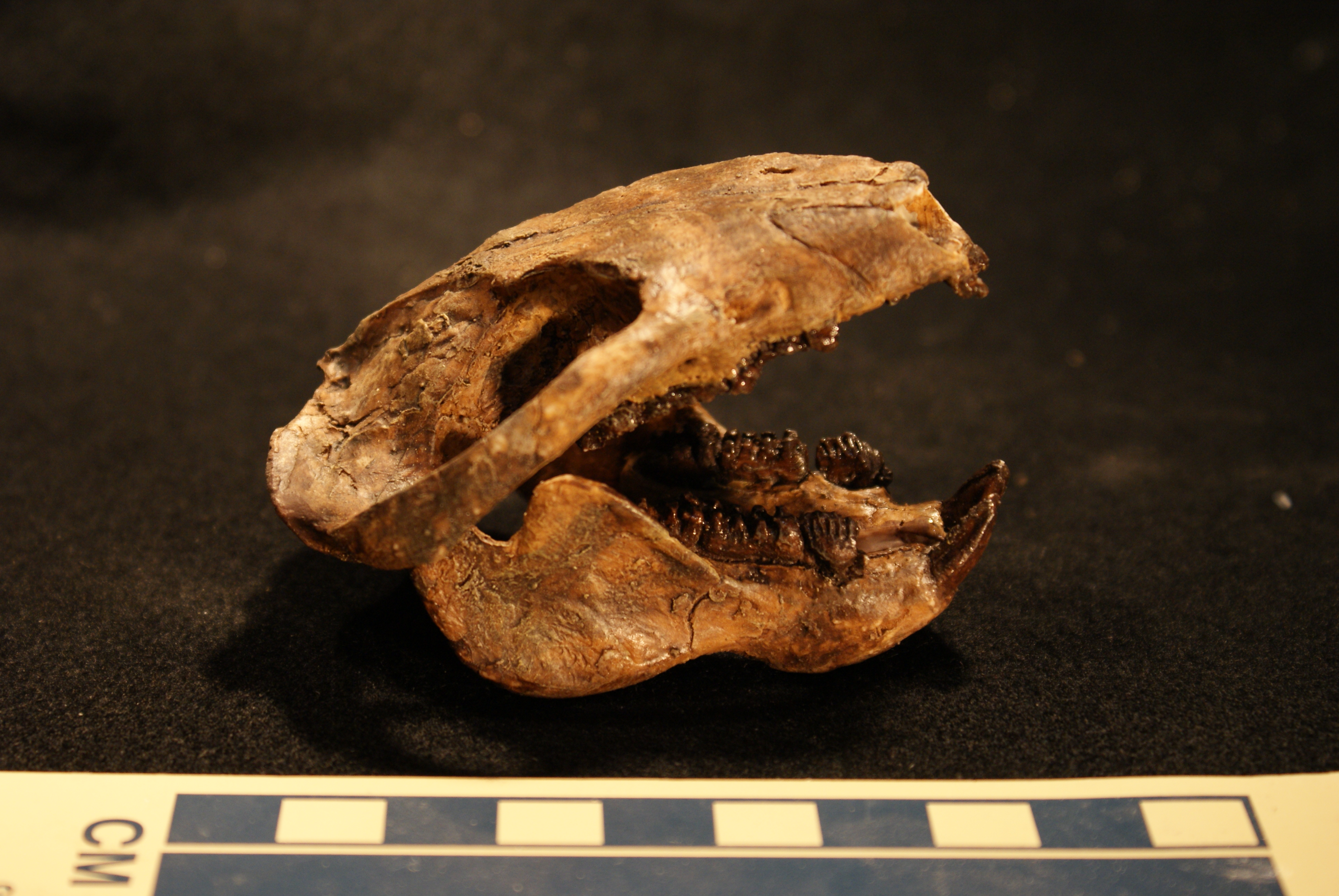
- Fossilized skull of the Late Cretaceous multituberculate mammal Meniscoessus
  †Meniscoessus
  - †Meniscoessus intermedius
- †Menuites
- †Mesodma
  - †Mesodma formosa
  - †Mesodma senecta
- †Metoicoceras
  - †Metoicoceras geslinianum
  - †Metoicoceras mosbyense – or unidentified comparable form
- †Modiolus
- †Monoclonius
- †Morrowites
  - †Morrowites depressus
  - †Morrowites subdepressus – type locality for species
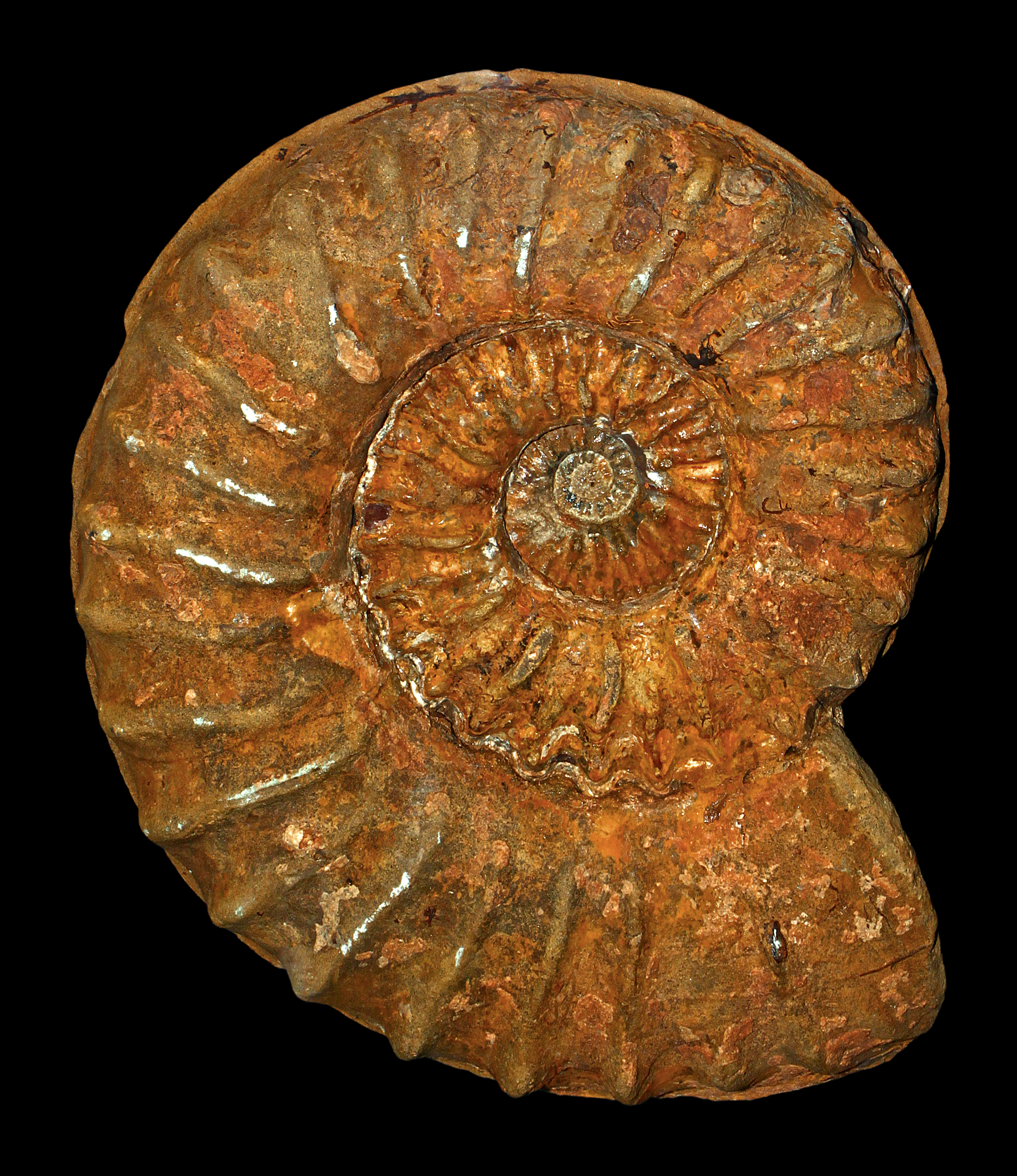
- Fossilized shell of the Early Cretaceous ammonoid cephalopod Mortoniceras
  †Mortoniceras
- †Myledaphus
  - †Myledaphus bipartitus
- †Naashoibitosaurus – type locality for genus
  - †Naashoibitosaurus ostromi – type locality for species
- †Navajodactylus – type locality for genus
  - †Navajodactylus boerei – type locality for species
- †Neithea
- †Neocalamites
- †Neocardioceras
  - †Neocardioceras juddii
- †Neoptychites
- Nicaisolopha
- †Nodocephalosaurus – type locality for genus
  - †Nodocephalosaurus kirtlandensis – type locality for species
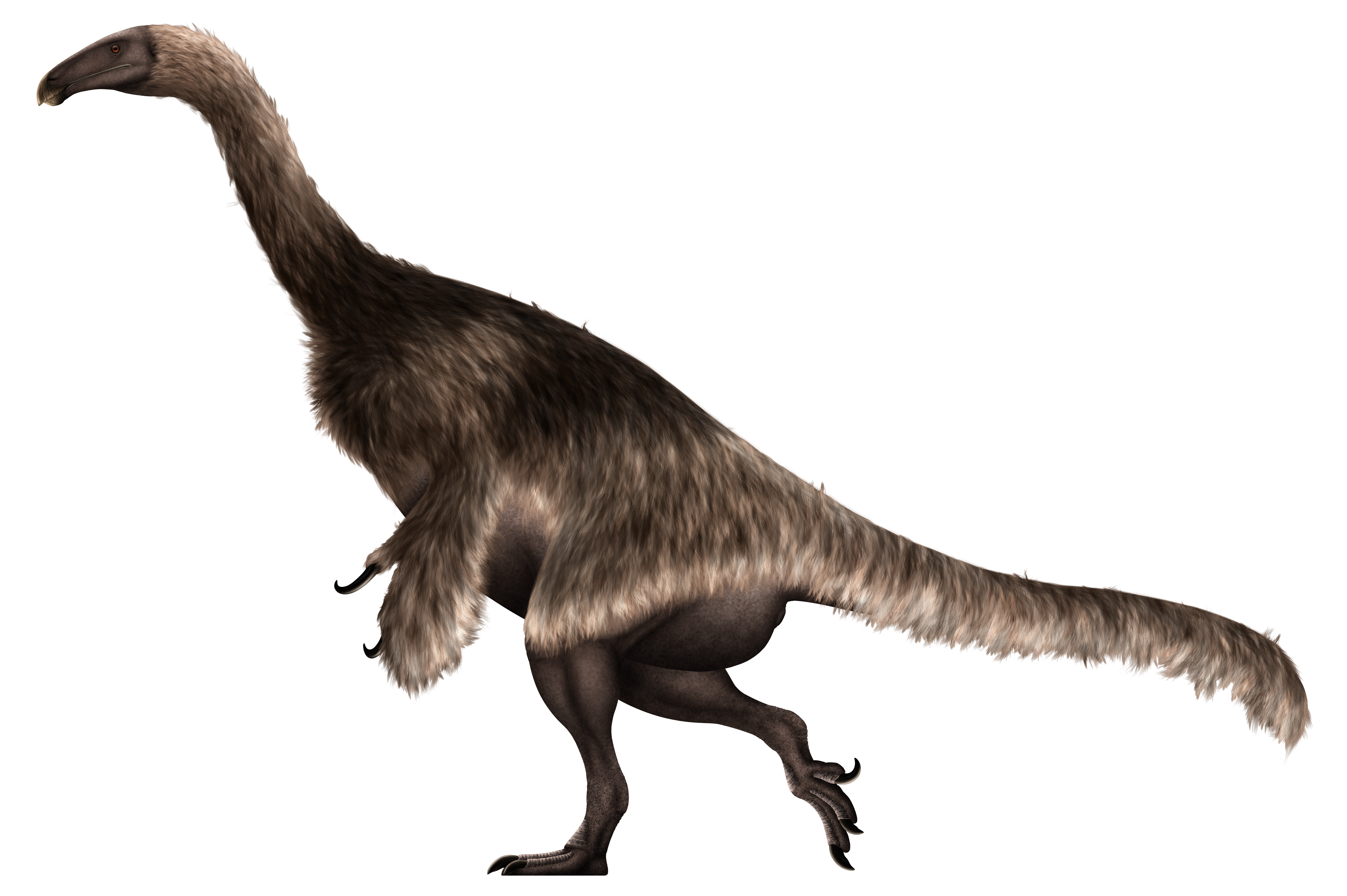
- Life restoration of the Late Cretaceous therizinosaur Nothronychus
  †Nothronychus – type locality for genus
  - †Nothronychus mckinleyi – type locality for species
- Odontaspis
  - †Odontaspis cheethami
  - †Odontaspis sanguinei – or unidentified comparable form
- †Ojoceratops – type locality for genus
  - †Ojoceratops fowleri – type locality for species
- †Ojoraptorsaurus – type locality for genus
  - †Ojoraptorsaurus boerei – type locality for species
- †Ophiomorpha
- †Opisthotriton
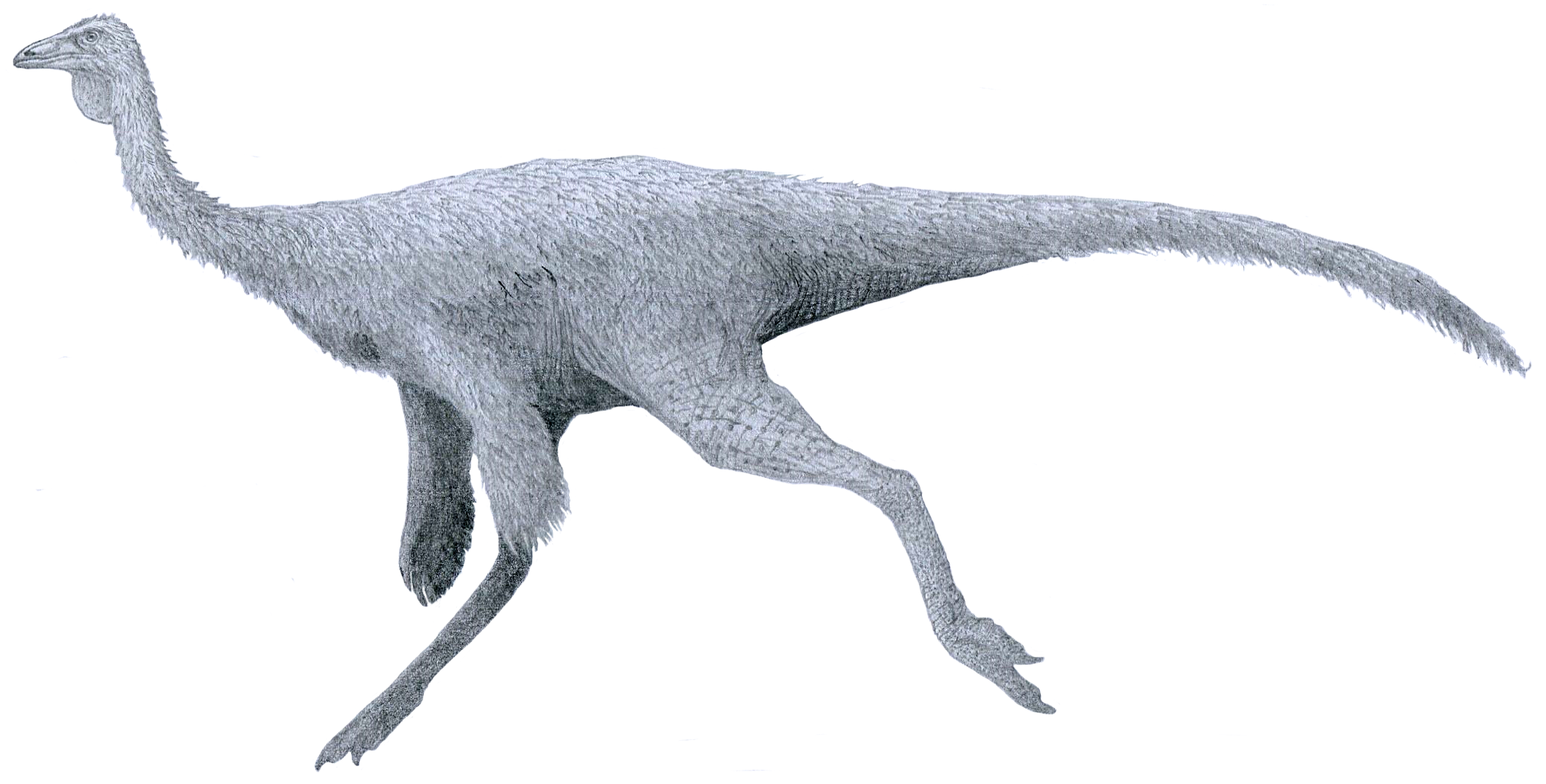
- Life restoration of the Late Cretaceous ostrich dinosaur Ornithomimus
  †Ornithomimus
  - †Ornithomimus edmontonicus
- Ostrea
- †Pachydesmoceras
- †Pagiophyllum
  - †Pagiophyllum duttonia
  - †Pagiophyllum navajoensis
  - †Pagiophyllum newberryi
  - †Pagiophyllum readiana
  - †Pagiophyllum zuniana
- †Paleopsephurus
  - †Paleopsephurus wilsoni
- †Panoplosaurus – tentative report
- †Paracimexomys
  - †Paracimexomys judithae
- †Paralbula
- †Parasaurolophus – type locality for genus
  - †Parasaurolophus cyrtocristatus – type locality for species
  - †Parasaurolophus tubicen – type locality for species
- †Paratypothorax
- †Paronychodon
  - †Paronychodon lacustris
- †Parrishia
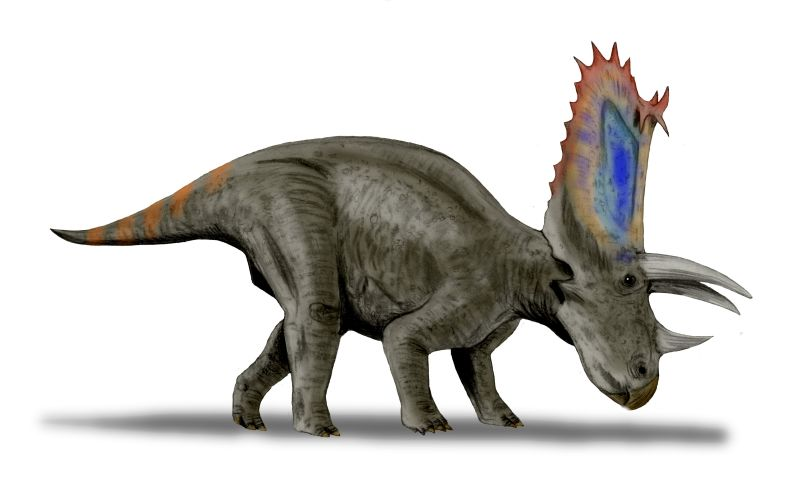
- Life restoration of the Late Cretaceous horned dinosaur Pentaceratops
  †Pentaceratops – type locality for genus
  - †Pentaceratops sternbergii – type locality for species
- Pholadomya
- †Pinna
- †Placenticeras
  - †Placenticeras cumminsi
  - †Placenticeras meeki
  - †Placenticeras pseudoplacenta
- †Planolites
- Platanus
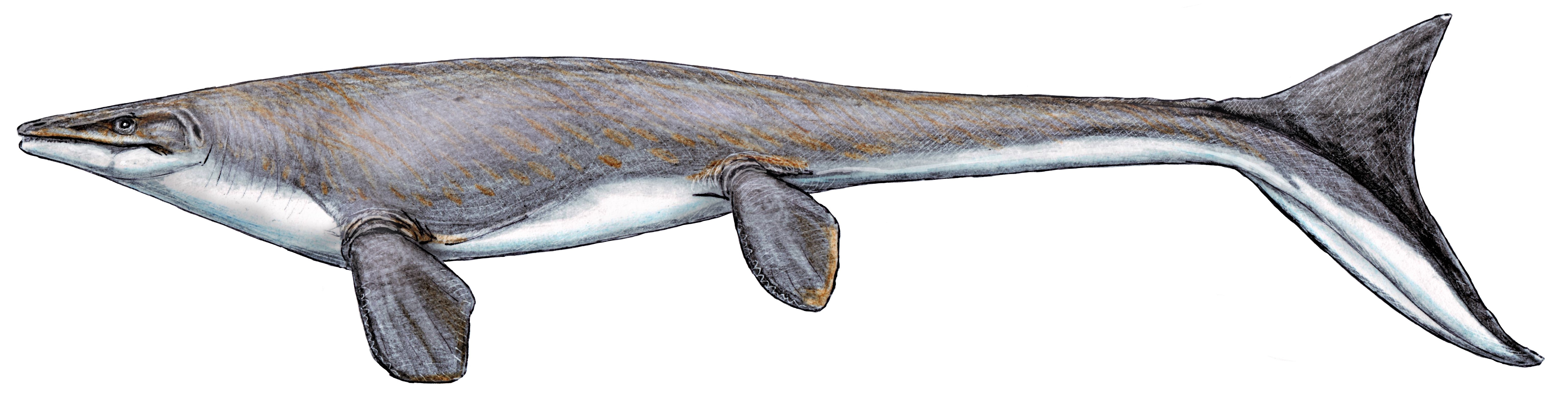
- Restoration of the Late Cretaceous mosasaur Platecarpus
  †Platecarpus – or unidentified comparable form
- †Platyceramus
  - †Platyceramus cycloides
  - †Platyceramus ezoensis - or unidentified loosely related form
  - †Platyceramus heinei
  - †Platyceramus mantelli - or unidentified loosely related form
  - †Platyceramus platinus
- Plicatula
- †Porituberoolithus
- †Postosuchus
- †Prenocephale
- †Prismatoolithus
- †Prodesmodon
- †Proganochelys – type locality for genus
- †Protocardia
- †Pseudocorax
- †Pseudoegertonia – or unidentified comparable form
- †Pseudoperna
  - †Pseudoperna congesta
- †Pseudotetrasauropus
- †Pterotrigonia
- †Ptychodus
  - †Ptychodus anonymus
  - †Ptychodus polygyrus
  - †Ptychodus whipplei
- †Ptychotrygon
  - †Ptychotrygon blainensis
  - †Ptychotrygon boothi
  - †Ptychotrygon triangularis
- Pycnodonte
  - †Pycnodonte kellumi
  - †Pycnodonte newberryi
- Quercus – or unidentified comparable form
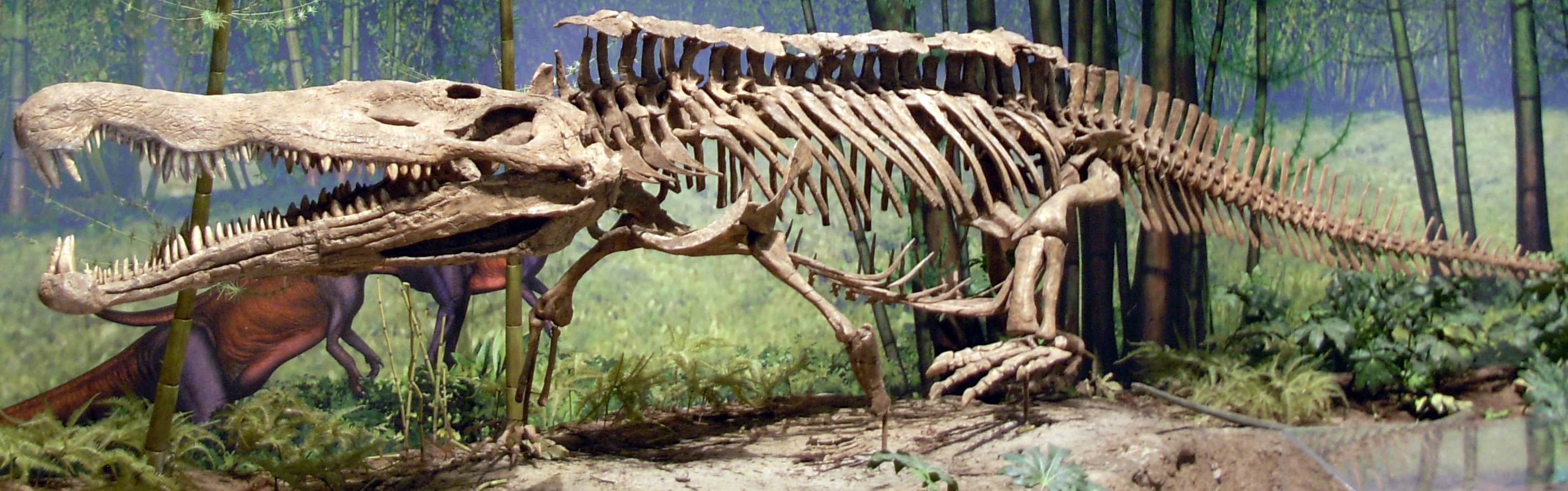
- Fossilized skeleton of the Late Triassic phytosaur Redondasaurus
  †Redondasaurus – type locality for genus
  - †Redondasaurus bermani – type locality for species
  - †Redondasaurus gregorii – type locality for species
- †Redondasuchus – type locality for genus
- †Redondavenator – type locality for genus
  - †Redondavenator quayensis – type locality for species
- †Revueltosaurus – type locality for genus
  - †Revueltosaurus callenderi – type locality for species
- †Rhamnus
- †Richardoestesia
  - †Richardoestesia isosceles – or unidentified comparable form
- †Rioarribasuchus
  - †Rioarribasuchus chamaensis – type locality for species
- †Romaniceras
- †Rutiodon
- Sabal
- Salix
- †Salvinia
- †Samaropsis
  - †Samaropsis bigelowii – type locality for species
  - †Samaropsis finchii – type locality for species
  - †Samaropsis lamyensis – type locality for species
  - †Samaropsis romeri – type locality for species
  - †Samaropsis whitensis – type locality for species
- †Saurolophus – tentative report
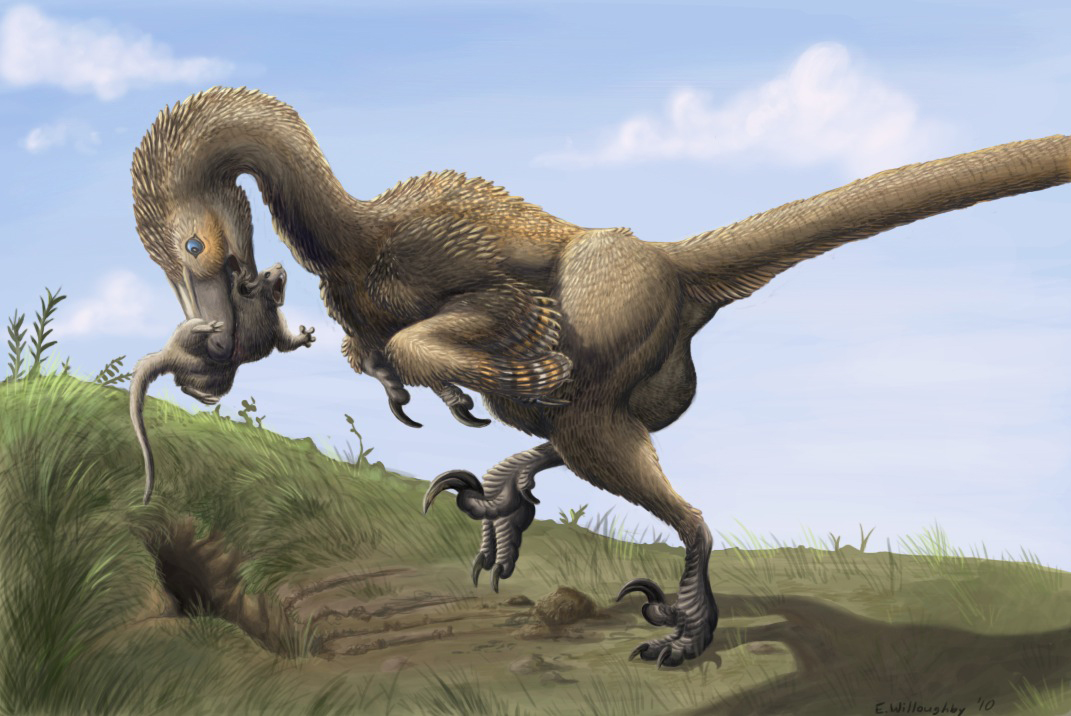
- Life restoration of the Late Cretaceous dromaeosaurid Saurornitholestes preying upon a multituberculate mammal
  †Saurornitholestes
  - †Saurornitholestes sullivani – type locality for species
- †Scapanorhynchus
  - †Scapanorhynchus rhaphiodon
- †Scaphites
  - †Scaphites ferronensis
  - †Scaphites hippocrepis
  - †Scaphites leei
  - †Scaphites rioensis
  - †Scaphites warreni
  - †Scaphites whitfieldi
- †Scotiophryne
- †Scoyenia
- †Semionotus
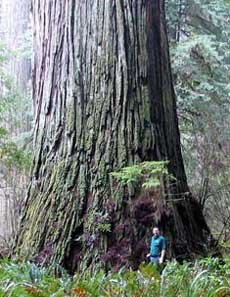
- Base of the trunk of a living Sequoia tree with a human to scale
  †Sequoia
- Serpula
- †Shuvosaurus
  - †Shuvosaurus inexpectatus
- Solemya
- †Sphaerotholus – type locality for genus
  - †Sphaerotholus goodwini – type locality for species
- Spirorbis – report made of unidentified related form or using admittedly obsolete nomenclature
- Squalicorax
  - †Squalicorax falcatus
  - †Squalicorax kaupi
- Squatina
- †Squatirhina
  - †Squatirhina americana
- †Stagonolepis
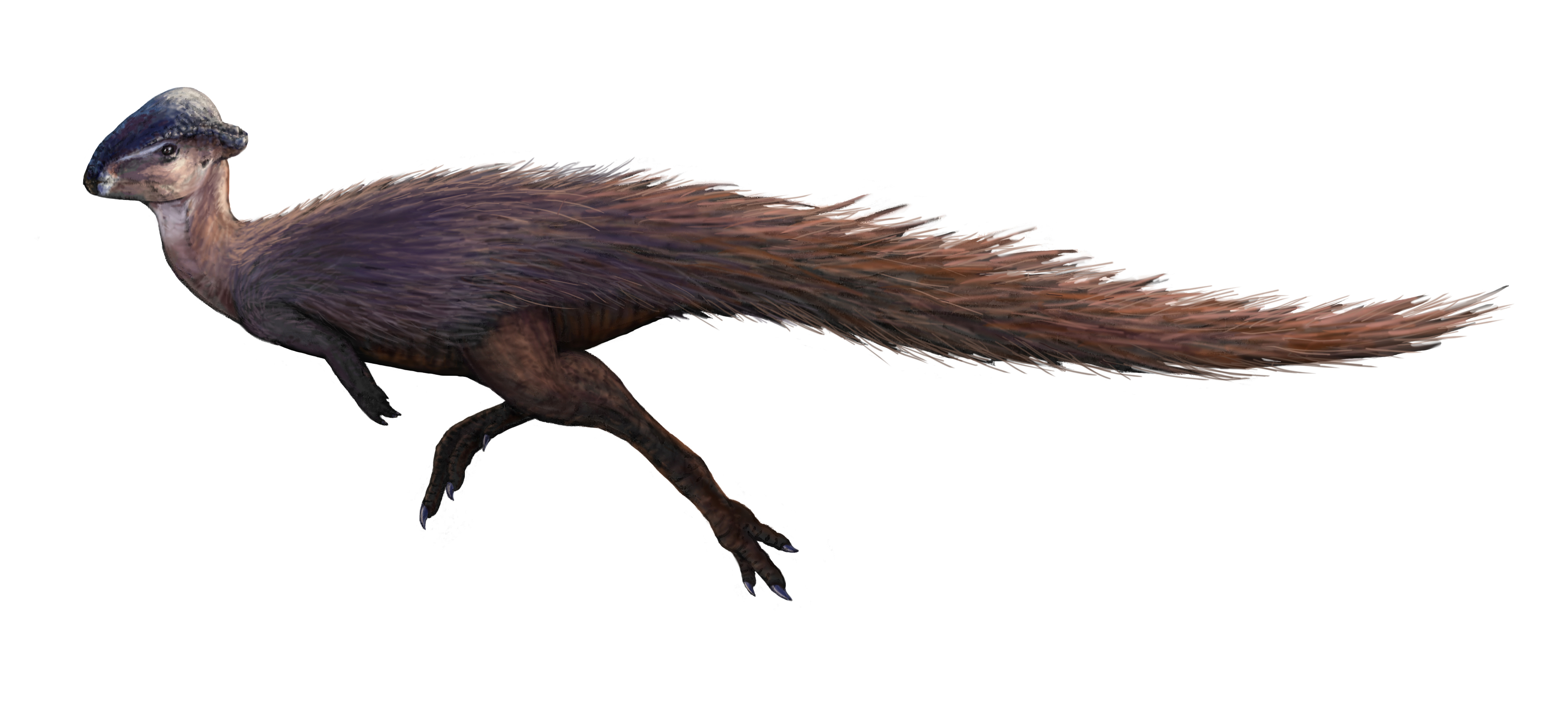
- Life restoration of the Late Cretaceous dome-headed dinosaur Stegoceras
  †Stegoceras – type locality for genus
  - †Stegoceras novomexicanum – type locality for species
  - †Stegoceras validum
- †Struthiomimus – or unidentified comparable form
  - †Struthiomimus altus
- †Tawa – type locality for genus
  - †Tawa hallae – type locality for species
- †Tecovasuchus
  - †Tecovasuchus chatterjeei
- Tellina
- †Teredina
- †Tetrasauropus – tentative report
- †Thalassinoides
- †Thescelosaurus – tentative report
- †Thoracosaurus – tentative report
- †Titanoceratops – type locality for genus
  - †Titanoceratops ouranos – type locality for species
- †Torosaurus
- †Tragodesmoceras
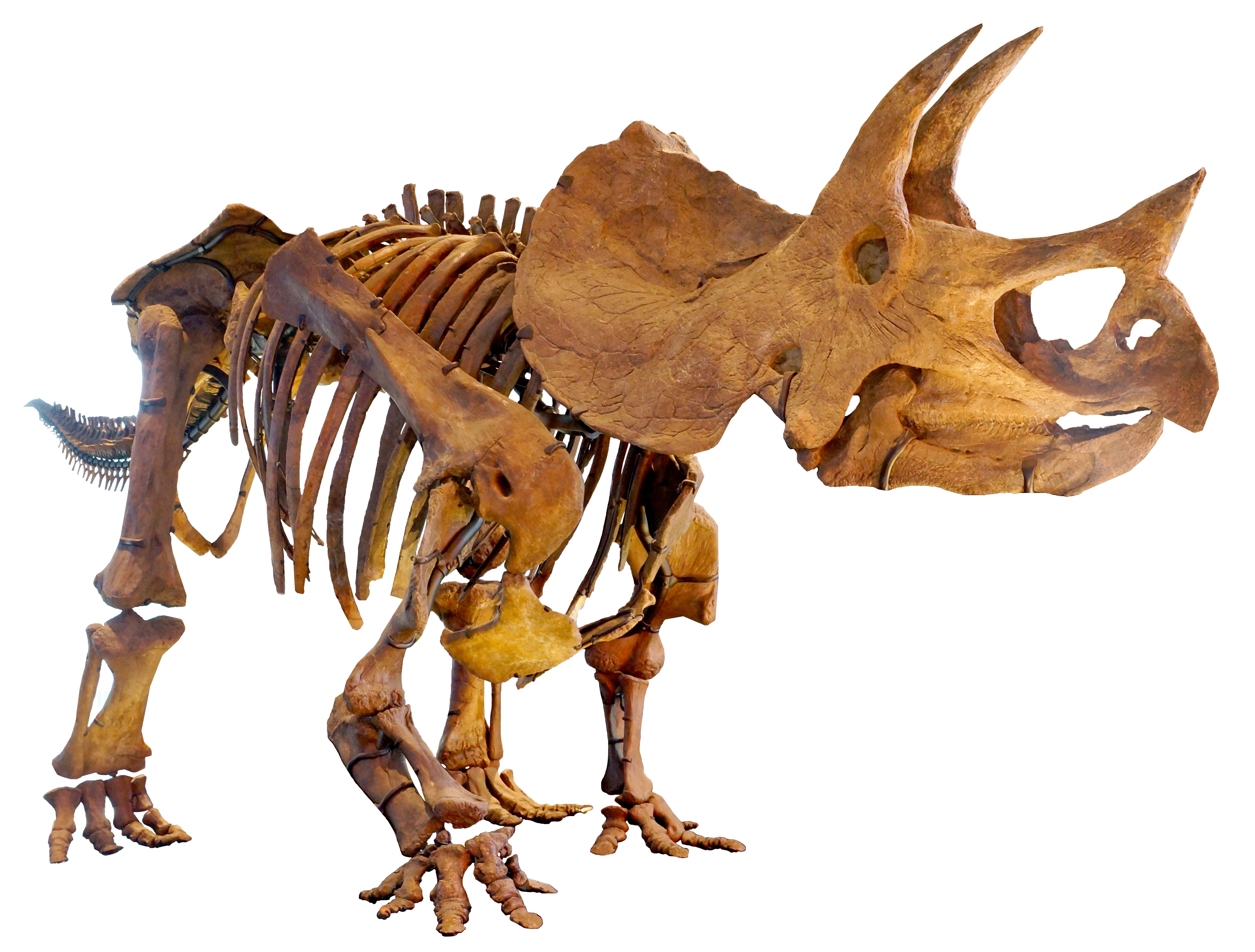
- Mounted fossilized skeleton of the Late Cretaceous horned dinosaur Triceratops
  †Triceratops
- †Trilophosaurus
  - †Trilophosaurus jacobsi
- †Triodus
- †Trochactaeon
- †Turrilites
  - †Turrilites acutus
  - †Turrilites costatus
- Turritella
- †Typothorax – type locality for genus
- †Tyrannosauripus – type locality for genus
  - †Tyrannosauripus pillmorei – type locality for species
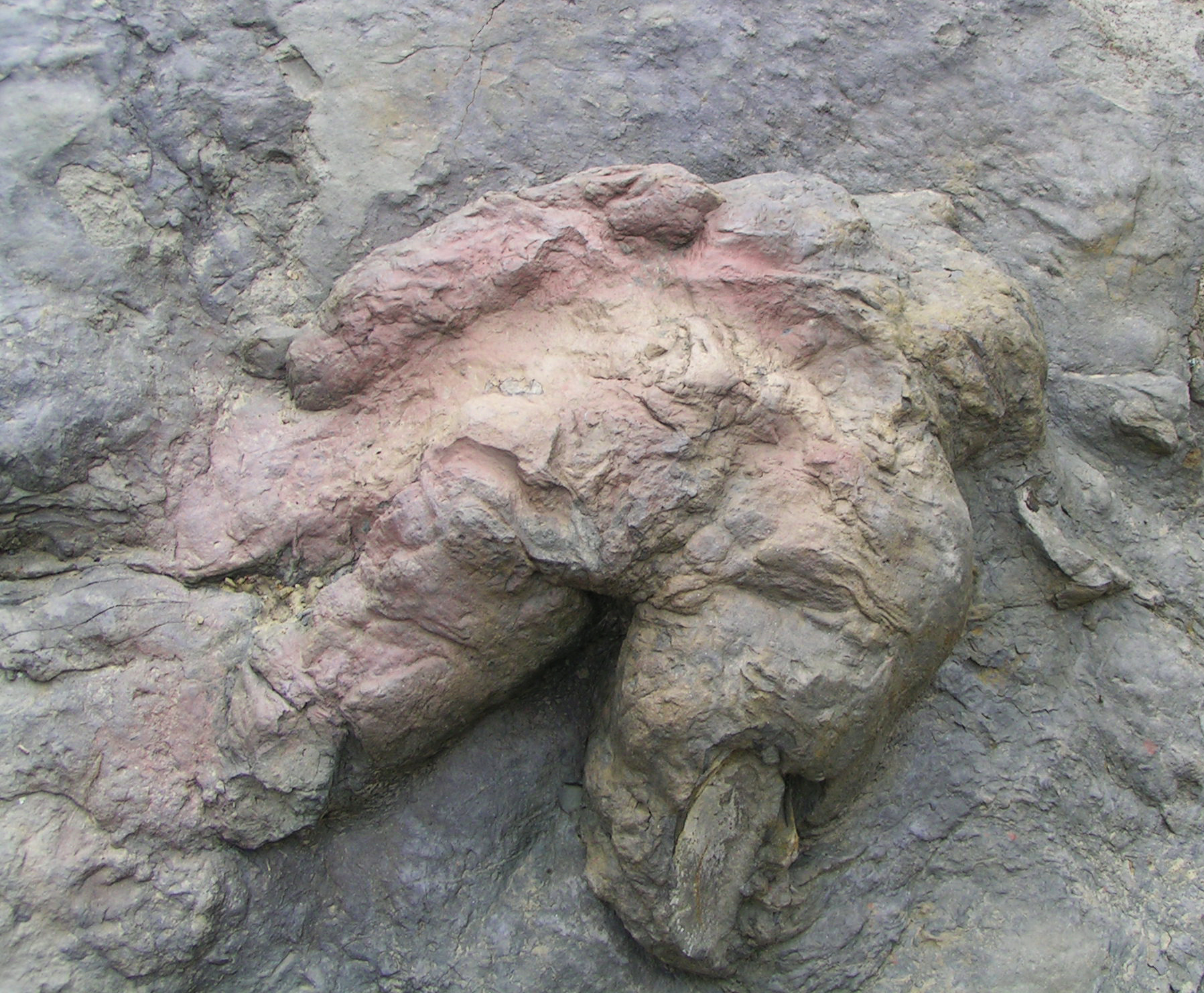
- Probable footprint from New Mexico
  †Tyrannosaurus
  - †Tyrannosaurus rex
- Unio
- †Vancleavea
  - †Vancleavea campi
- †Vascoceras
- †Viburnum
- †Vinella
- †Vivaron – type locality for genus
- †Volviceramus
- †Watinoceras
- †Whitakersaurus – type locality for genus
  - †Whitakersaurus bermani – type locality for species
- †Williamsonia
- †Woodwardia – tentative report
- †Xenacanthus – report made of unidentified related form or using admittedly obsolete nomenclature
- Xenophora
- †Zamites
  - †Zamites occidentalis
  - †Zamites powellii
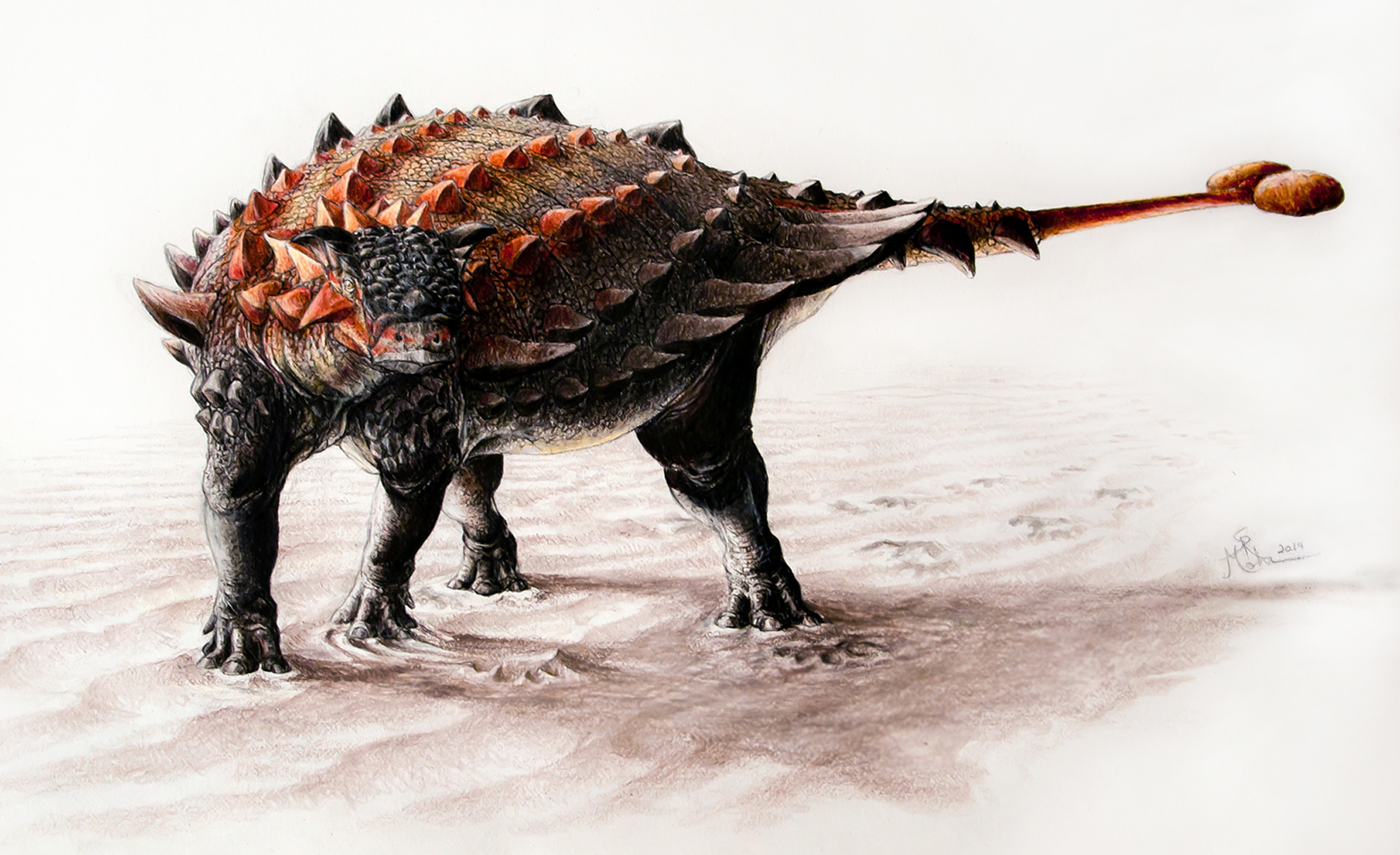
- Life restoration of the Late Cretaceous armored dinosaur Ziapelta
  †Ziapelta – type locality for genus
  - †Ziapelta sanjuanensis – type locality for species
- Zizyphus
- †Zuniceratops – type locality for genus
  - †Zuniceratops christopheri – type locality for species

== Cenozoic ==
- Accipiter
- †Acritohippus
  - †Acritohippus isonesus
- Aechmophorus
  - †Aechmophorus occidentalis
- †Aelurodon
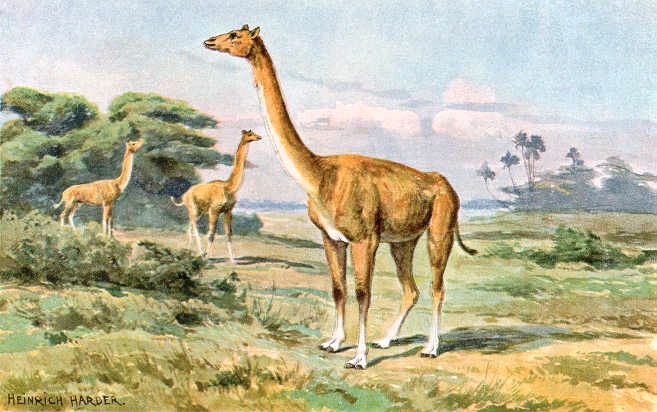
- Life restoration of the Miocene camel Aepycamelus, or the long-necked camel. Heinrich Harder (1920).
  †Aepycamelus
- Aix
  - †Aix sponsa
- †Akanthosuchus – type locality for genus
  - †Akanthosuchus langstoni – type locality for species
- †Alforjas
- †Ambystoma
  - †Ambystoma tigrinum
- Ammospermophilus
  - †Ammospermophilus leucurus – or unidentified comparable form
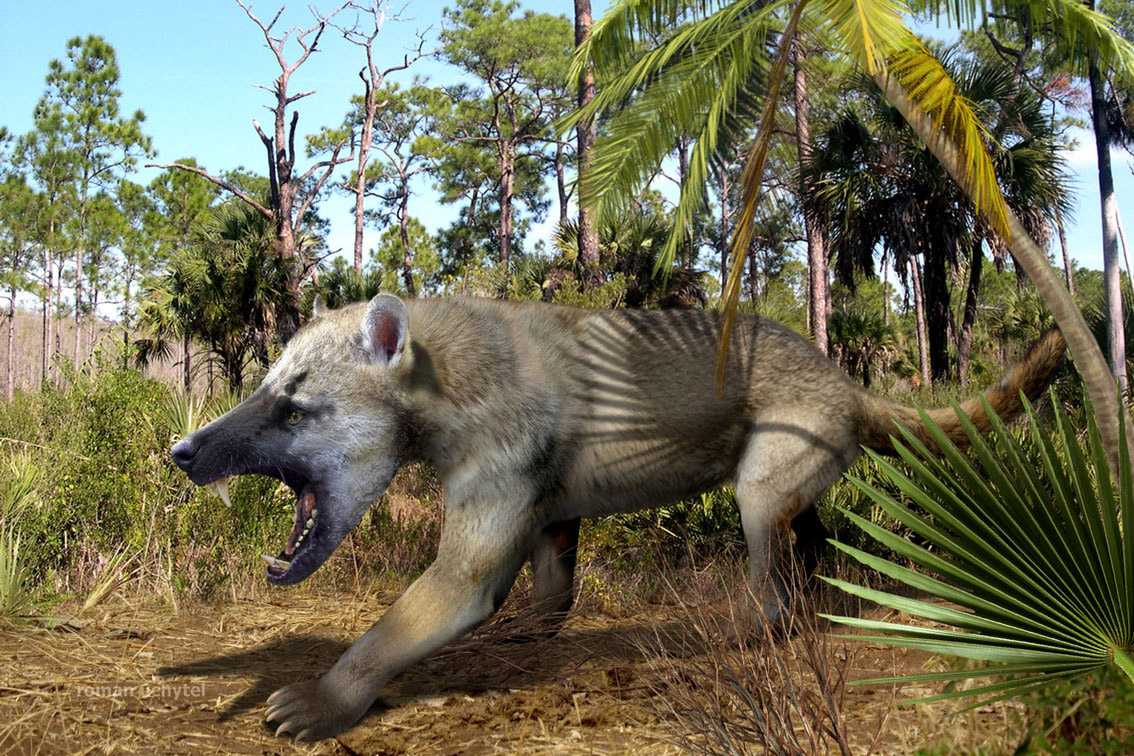
- Life restoration of the Miocene-Pliocene beardog Amphicyon
  †Amphicyon
  - †Amphicyon ingens
- †Anabernicula
- Anas
  - †Anas acuta
  - †Anas carolinensis – tentative report
  - †Anas platyrhynchos
- †Anconodon
- †Ankalagon
  - †Ankalagon saurognathus
- Antilocapra
  - †Antilocapra americana
- Antrozous
  - †Antrozous pallidus
- Aphelocoma
  - †Aphelocoma coerulescens
- †Aphelops
- Aquila
  - †Aquila chrysaetos
- †Archaeohippus
- †Arctocyon
- †Arctodus
  - †Arctodus simus
- †Artocarpus
- Asio
  - †Asio flammeus
- †Astrohippus
- †Athene cunicularia
- †Australocamelus
- Aythya
  - †Aythya valisineria
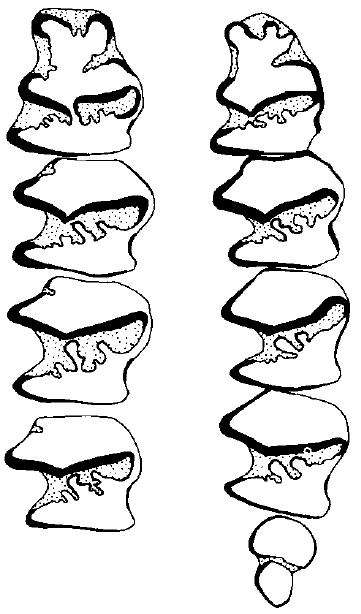
- Fossilized teeth of the Pliocene-Pleistocene rabbit relative Aztlanolagus
  †Aztlanolagus
- †Baena
- Baiomys
- Bassariscus
  - †Bassariscus astutus
- †Betonnia – type locality for genus
- Bison
  - †Bison antiquus
  - †Bison latifrons
- †Blancocamelus
- †Blastomeryx
  - †Blastomeryx gemmifer
- †Borealosuchus
  - †Borealosuchus acutidentatus
- †Borophagus
  - †Borophagus hilli
  - †Borophagus secundus
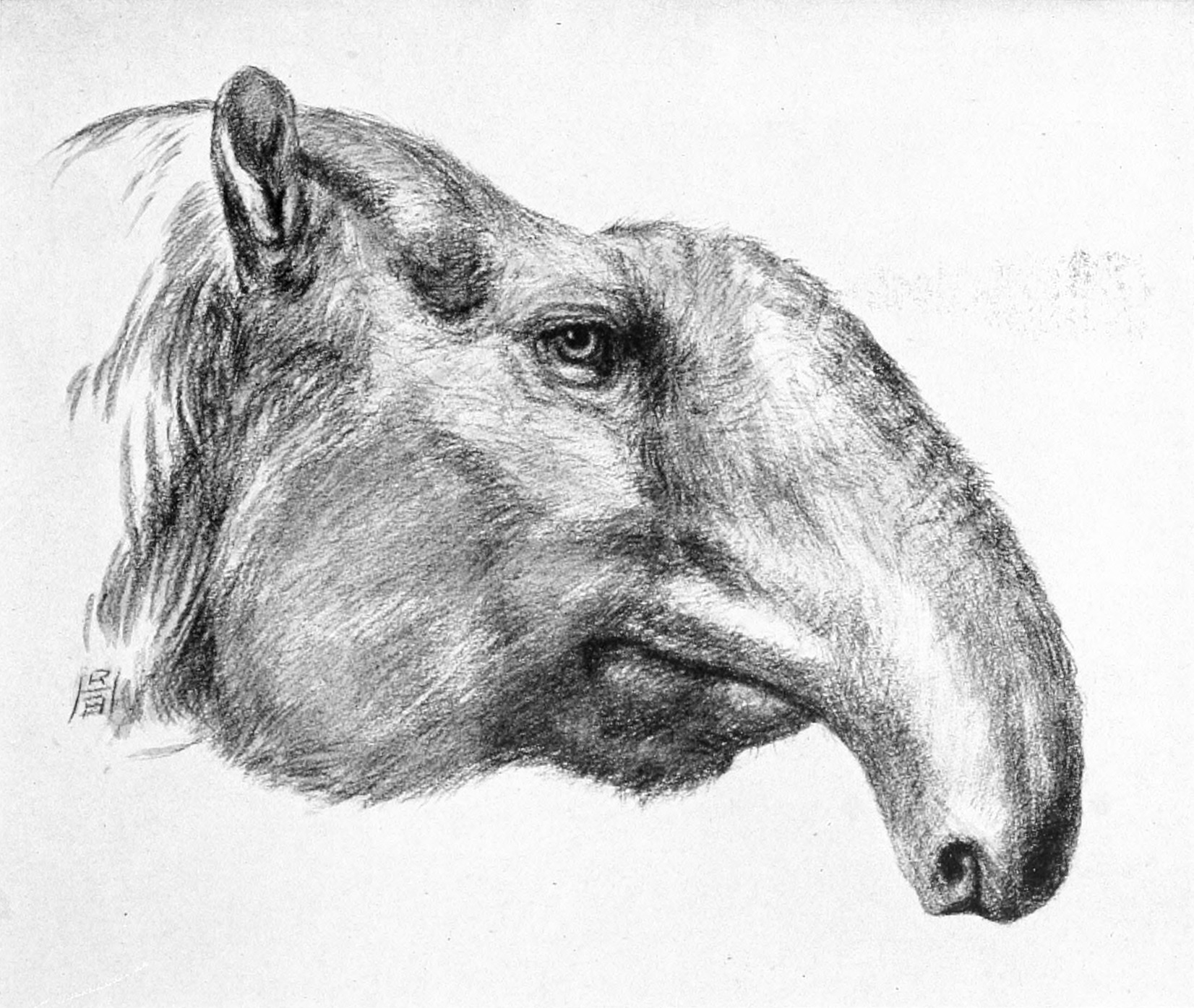
- Restorative portrait of the Miocene oreodont mammal Brachycrus
  †Brachycrus
- †Brachyhyops
- †Breagyps
  - †Breagyps clarki
- Bubo
  - †Bubo virginianus
- Bufo
  - †Bufo punctatus
  - †Bufo woodhousei
- Burhinus
- Buteo
  - †Buteo jamaicensis
  - †Buteo lagopus
  - †Buteo nitidus
  - †Buteo swainsoni
- Callipepla – or unidentified comparable form
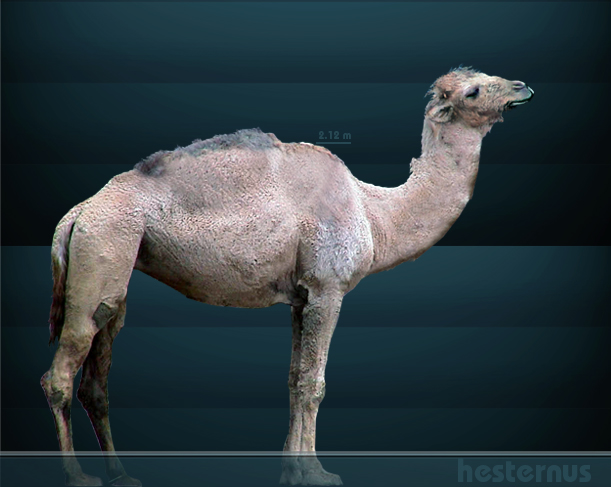
- Life restoration of the Pliocene-Holocene camel Camelops
  †Camelops
  - †Camelops hesternus
- Canis
  - †Canis armbrusteri
  - †Canis dirus
  - †Canis latrans
  - †Canis lepophagus
  - †Canis lupus
  - †Canis rufus
- †Cantius
  - †Cantius angulatus
  - †Cantius frugivorus
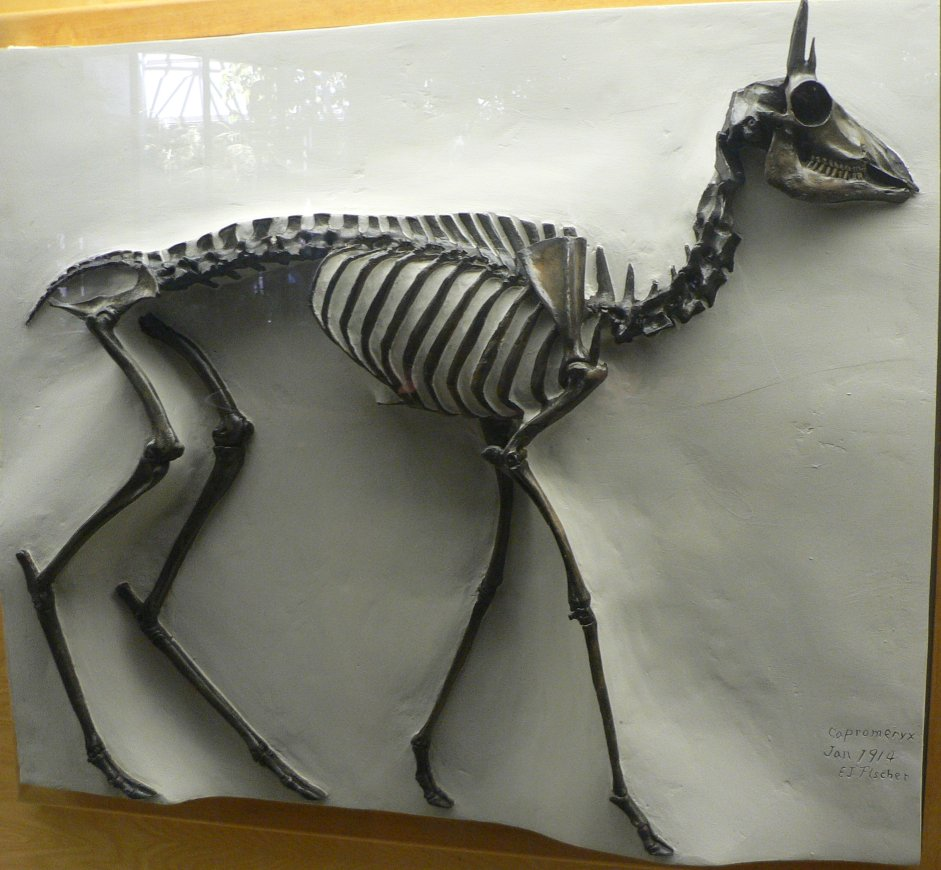
- Fossilized skeleton of the Pleistocene dwarf pronghorn Capromeryx
  †Capromeryx
- Caracara
- †Carpocyon
- Castor
  - †Castor canadensis
- Cathartes
  - †Cathartes aura
- †Catopsalis
  - †Catopsalis fissidens
  - †Catopsalis foliatus
- Celtis
- †Cephalogale
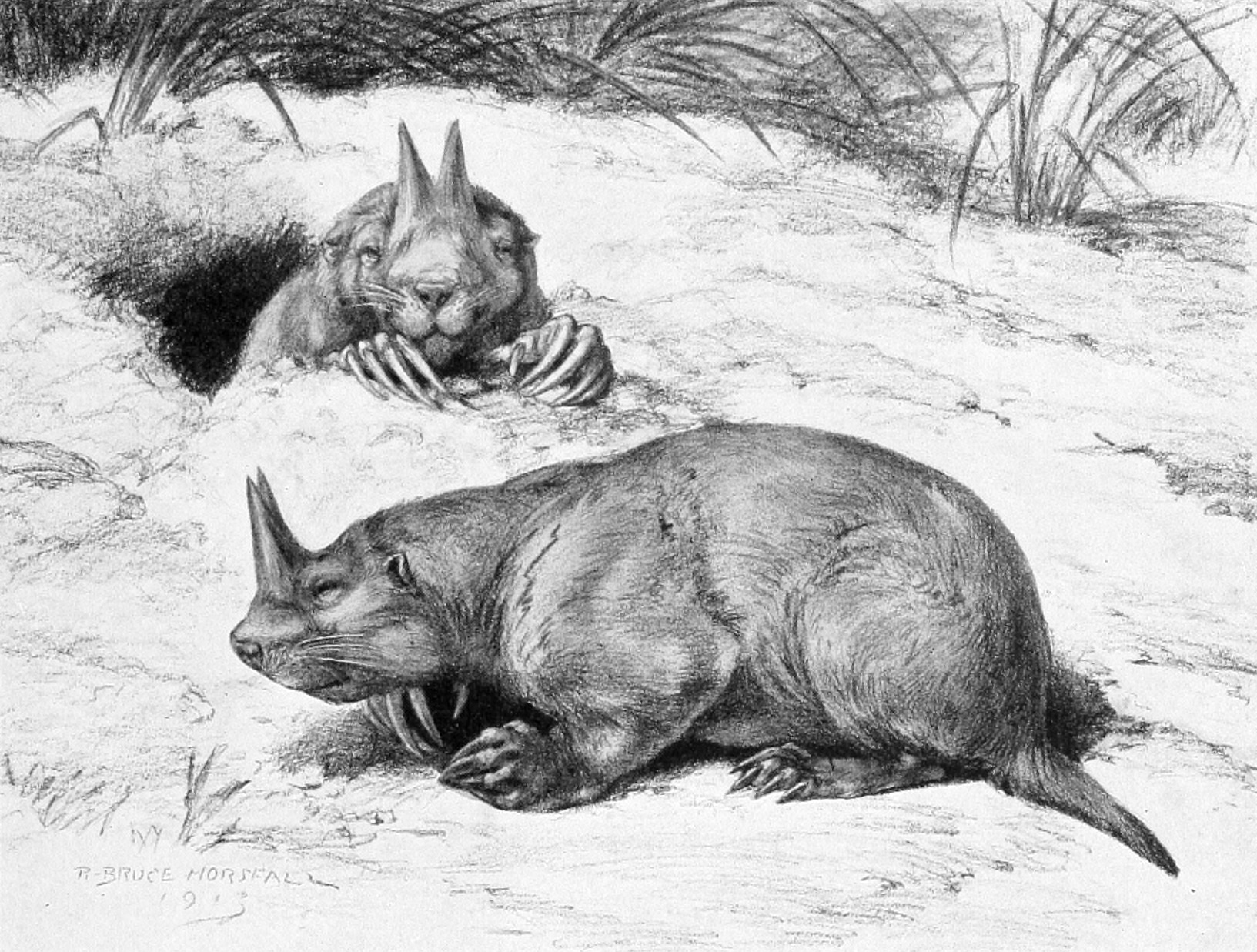
- Life restoration of the Miocene-Pleistocene horned gopher Ceratogaulus. Robert Bruce Horsfall (1913).
  †Ceratogaulus
- Cercidiphyllum
- †Cerdocyon
- †Chacomylus – type locality for genus
- †Chacopterygus – type locality for genus
- Chaetodipus
  - †Chaetodipus intermedius
- †Chriacus
- Cissus
- Clethrionomys
  - †Clethrionomys rutilus – or unidentified comparable form
- Cnemidophorus
- Colaptes
  - †Colaptes auratus
- Colinus – tentative report
  - †Colinus virginianus
- †Compsemys
- Conepatus
  - †Conepatus leuconotus
- †Copecion
- †Copelemur
- †Cophosaurus – tentative report
  - †Cophosaurus texanus
- Coragyps
  - †Coragyps atratus
  - †Coragyps occidentalis
- †Cormohipparion
- Corvus
  - †Corvus corax
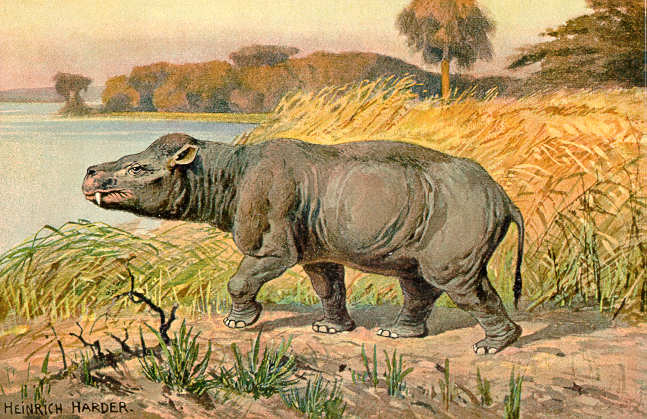
- Life restoration of the Paleocene-Eocene pantodont mammal Coryphodon. Heinrich Harder (1920).
  †Coryphodon
- †Cosoryx
- †Cranioceras
- Cratogeomys
  - †Cratogeomys castanops
- Crotalus
  - †Crotalus atrox
- Crotaphytus
  - †Crotaphytus collaris
- Cryptotis
  - †Cryptotis parva
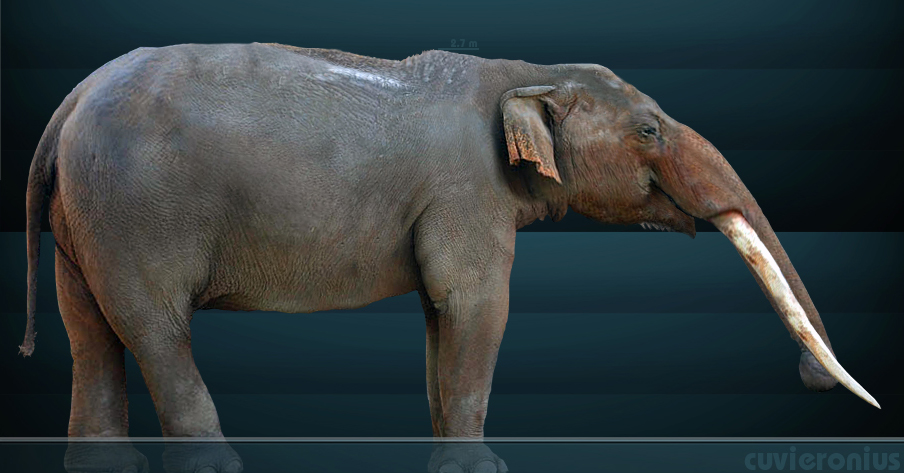
- Life restoration of the Pliocene-Holocene elephant relative Cuvieronius
  †Cuvieronius
  - †Cuvieronius tropicus
- Cyanocitta – tentative report
- †Cynarctoides
  - †Cynarctoides acridens
  - †Cynarctoides gawnae – type locality for species
- †Cynelos
- Cynomys
  - †Cynomys gunnisoni
  - †Cynomys ludovicianus
- Cyrtonyx – or unidentified comparable form
  - †Cyrtonyx montezumae
- †Daphoenodon
- †Desmatippus
- †Desmatochoerus
- †Desmocyon
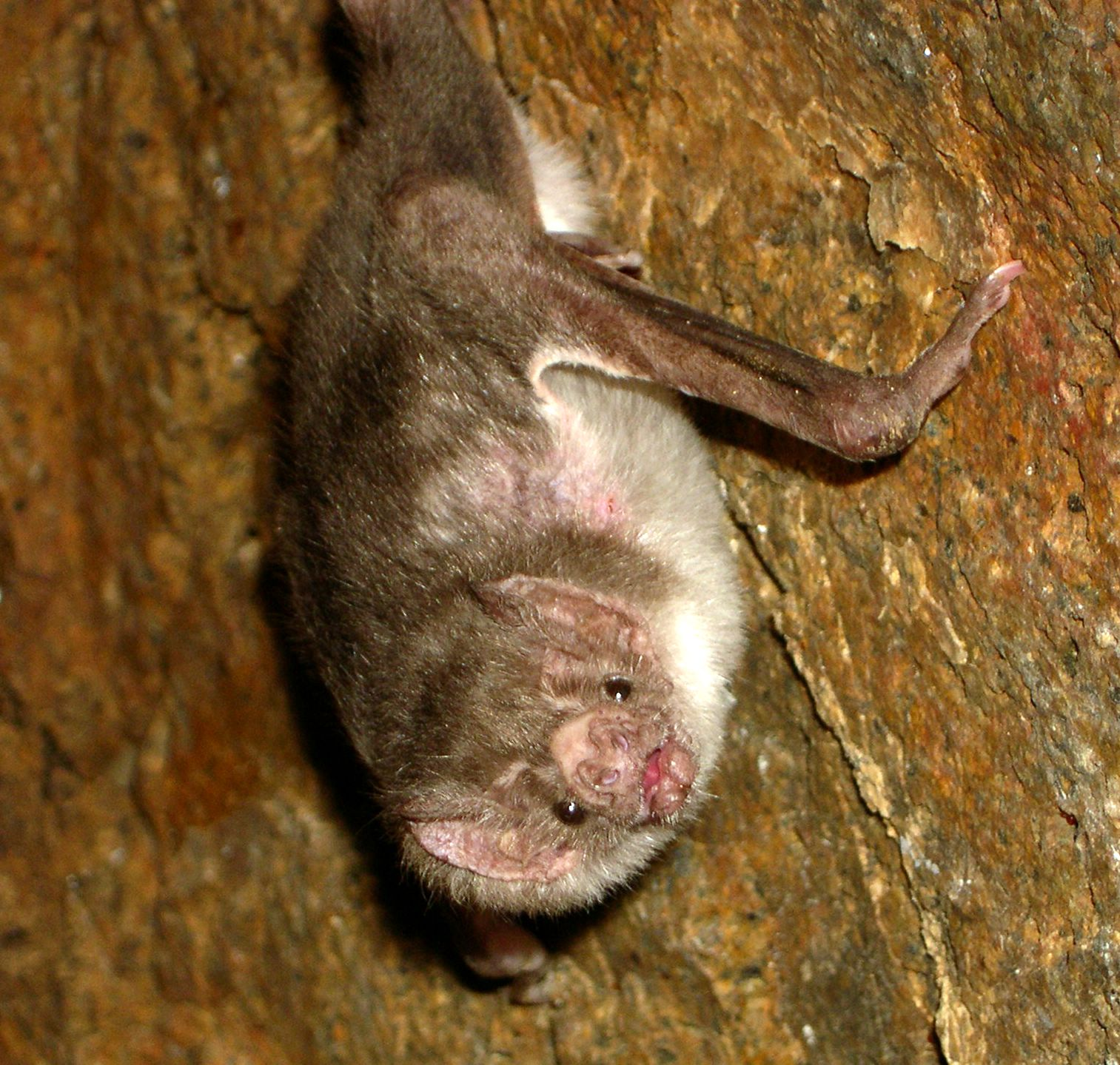
- A living Desmodus, or vampire bat
  Desmodus
  - †Desmodus stocki
- †Diacodexis
- †Didymictis
- †Dinohippus
- Dipodomys
  - †Dipodomys merriami
  - †Dipodomys ordii
  - †Dipodomys spectabilis
- †Dipoides
- †Dissacus
- †Dromomeryx
  - †Dromomeryx borealis
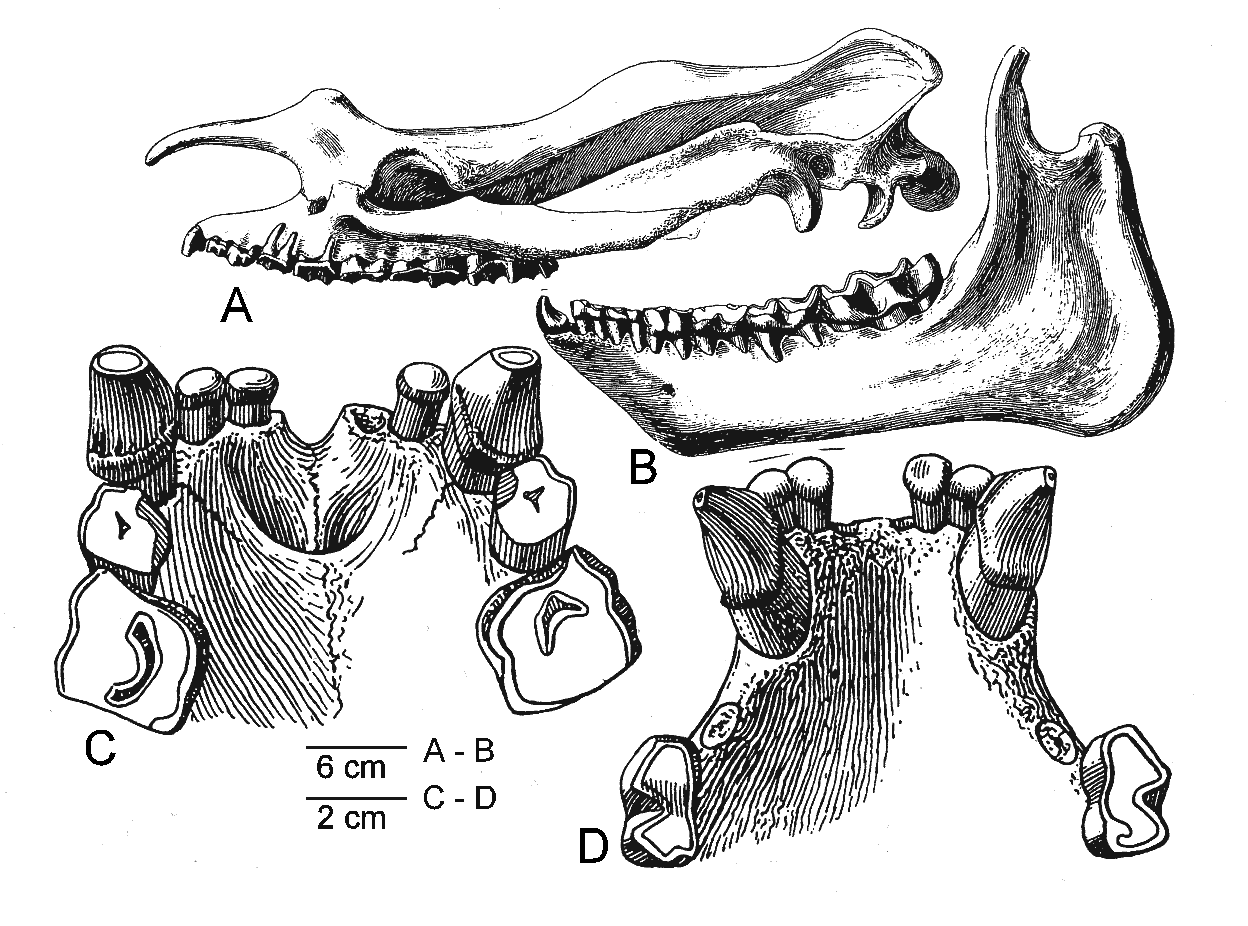
- Illustration of the fossilized jaws and teeth of the Eocene brontothere mammal Duchesneodus
  †Duchesneodus
- †Echmatemys
- †Ectoconus
- †Ectopistes
  - †Ectopistes migratorius
- Elaphe
- †Eoconodon
  - †Eoconodon coryphaeus
  - †Eoconodon ginibitohia – type locality for species
- †Eohippus
  - †Eohippus angustidens
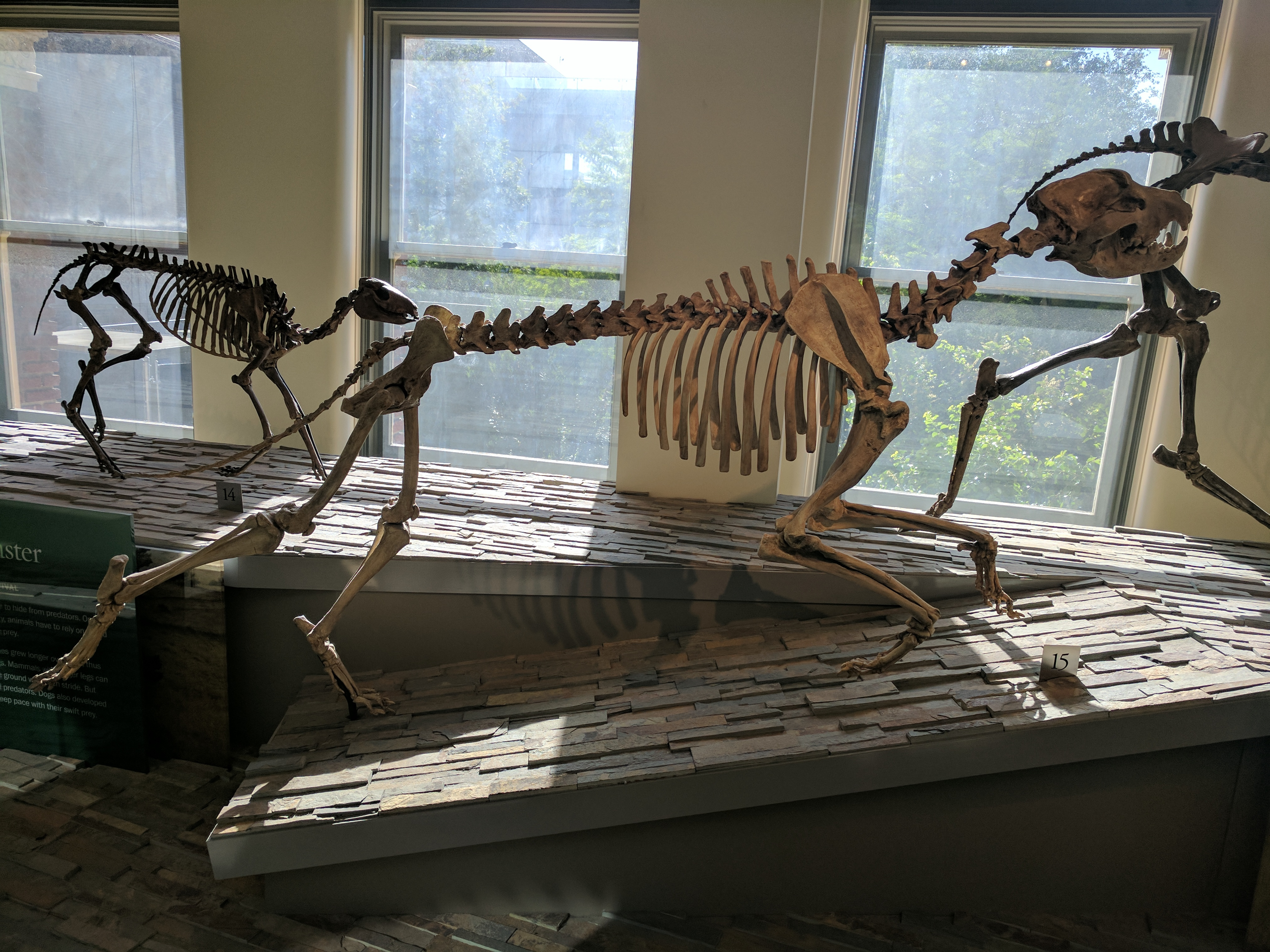
- Fossilized skeleton of the Miocene bone-crushing dog Epicyon
  †Epicyon
  - †Epicyon haydeni
- Eptesicus
  - †Eptesicus fuscus
- Equus
  - †Equus conversidens
  - †Equus francisci
  - †Equus niobrarensis – or unidentified comparable form
  - †Equus scotti
  - †Equus simplicidens
- Erethizon
  - †Erethizon dorsatum
- †Eucastor
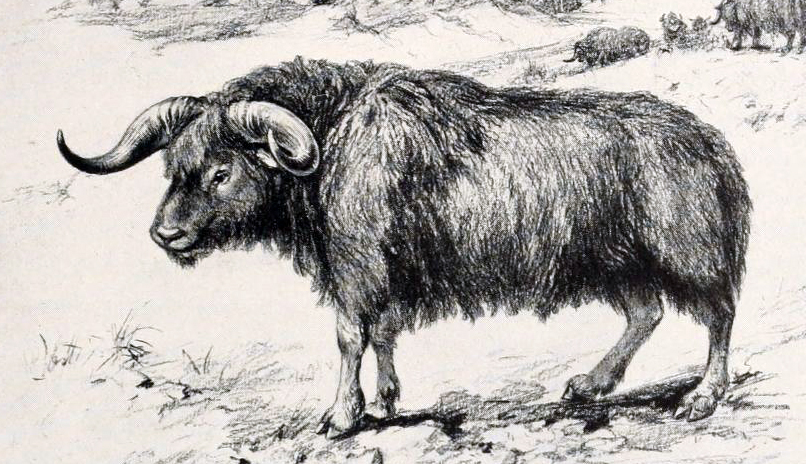
- Life restoration of the Pleistocene bovid Euceratherium, or the shrub ox. Robert Bruce Horsfall (1913).
  †Euceratherium
  - †Euceratherium collinum
- †Eucommia
- †Eucosmodon
  - †Eucosmodon americanus
  - †Eucosmodon primus – type locality for species
- †Eucyon
  - †Eucyon davisi
  - †Eucyon ferox
- Eutamias
  - †Eutamias minimus
- Falco
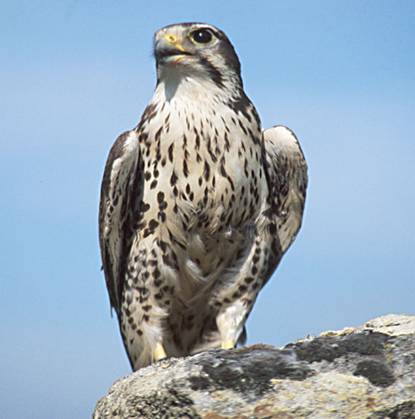
  - A living Falco mexicanus, or prairie falcon
    †Falco mexicanus
  - †Falco peregrinus – tentative report
  - †Falco sparverius
  - †Falco swarthi
- Ficus
- †Fulica
  - †Fulica americana
- †Gaillardia
- †Geococcyx
  - †Geococcyx californianus
- Geomys
- †Gigantocamelus
- †Glossotherium – or unidentified comparable form
- Glyptostrobus
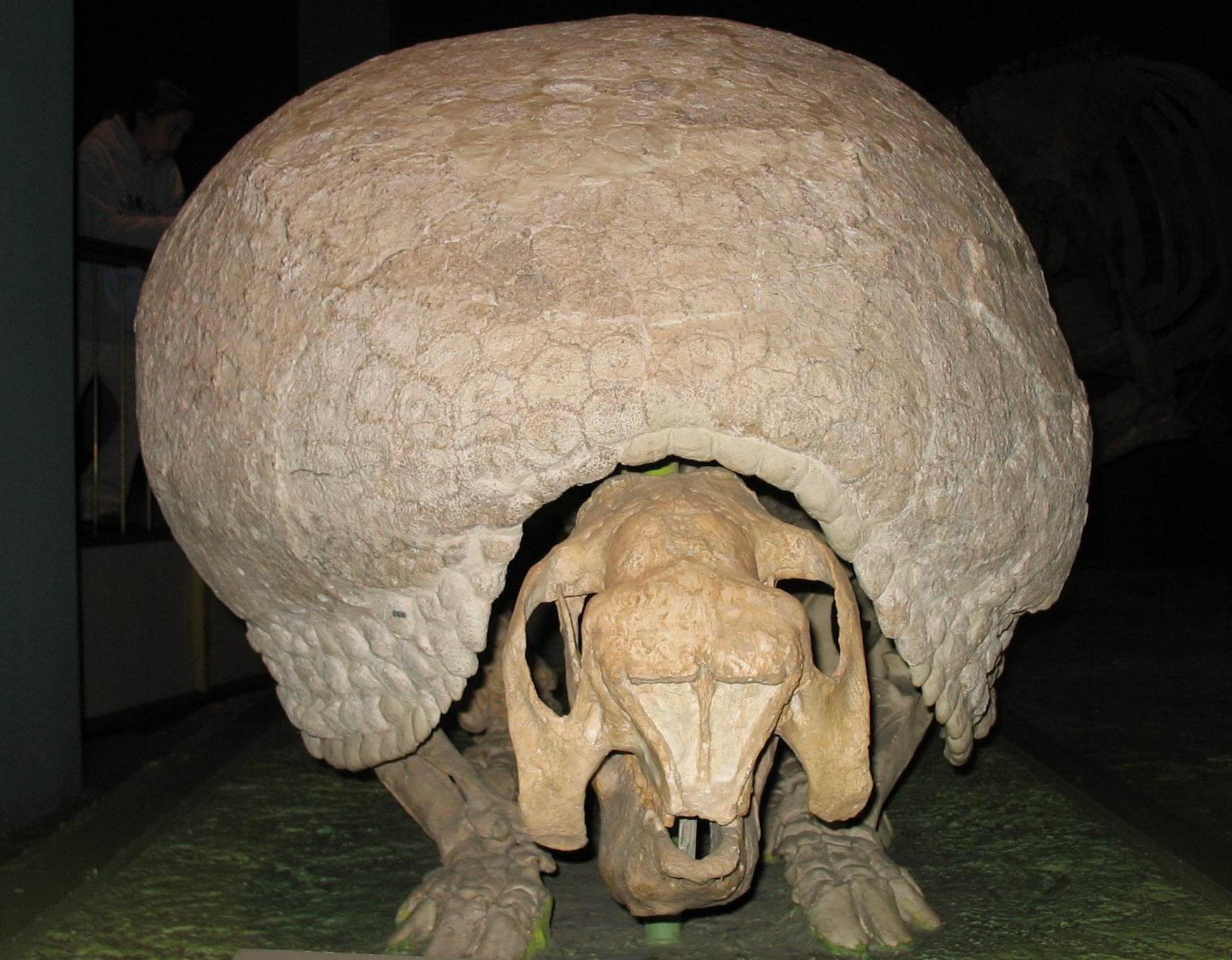
- Mounted fossilized skeleton of the Pleistocene armadillo relative Glyptotherium
  †Glyptotherium
- †Gomphotherium
- †Goniacodon
- Gopherus
  - †Gopherus agassizii
- Grus
  - †Grus canadensis
- Gymnogyps
  - †Gymnogyps californianus
- †Habrosaurus
  - †Habrosaurus dilatus
- †Hadrianus
- †Hemiauchenia
  - †Hemiauchenia macrocephala
- †Heptodon
- †Hesperotestudo
- †Hippotherium
- Homo
  - †Homo sapiens
- †Homogalax – or unidentified comparable form
- †Hoplochelys
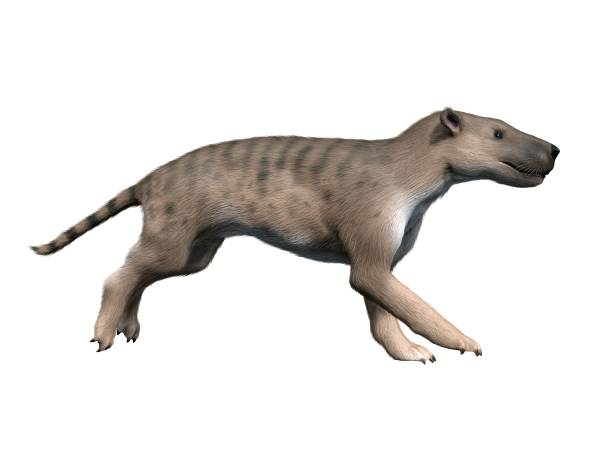
- Life restoration of the Eocene-Miocene creodont mammal Hyaenodon
  †Hyaenodon
  - †Hyaenodon horridus
- †Hydromystria
- †Hyopsodus
- †Hypohippus
- †Hypolagus
- †Hyracodon – or unidentified comparable form
- †Hyracotherium
  - †Hyracotherium vasacciense
- †Intyrictis
- †Kimbetohia – type locality for genus
- †Kimbetopsalis – type locality for genus
  - †Kimbetopsalis simmonsae – type locality for species
- Kinosternon
  - †Kinosternon flavescens
- Lagurus
- Lampropeltis
  - †Lampropeltis getulus
- Laurus
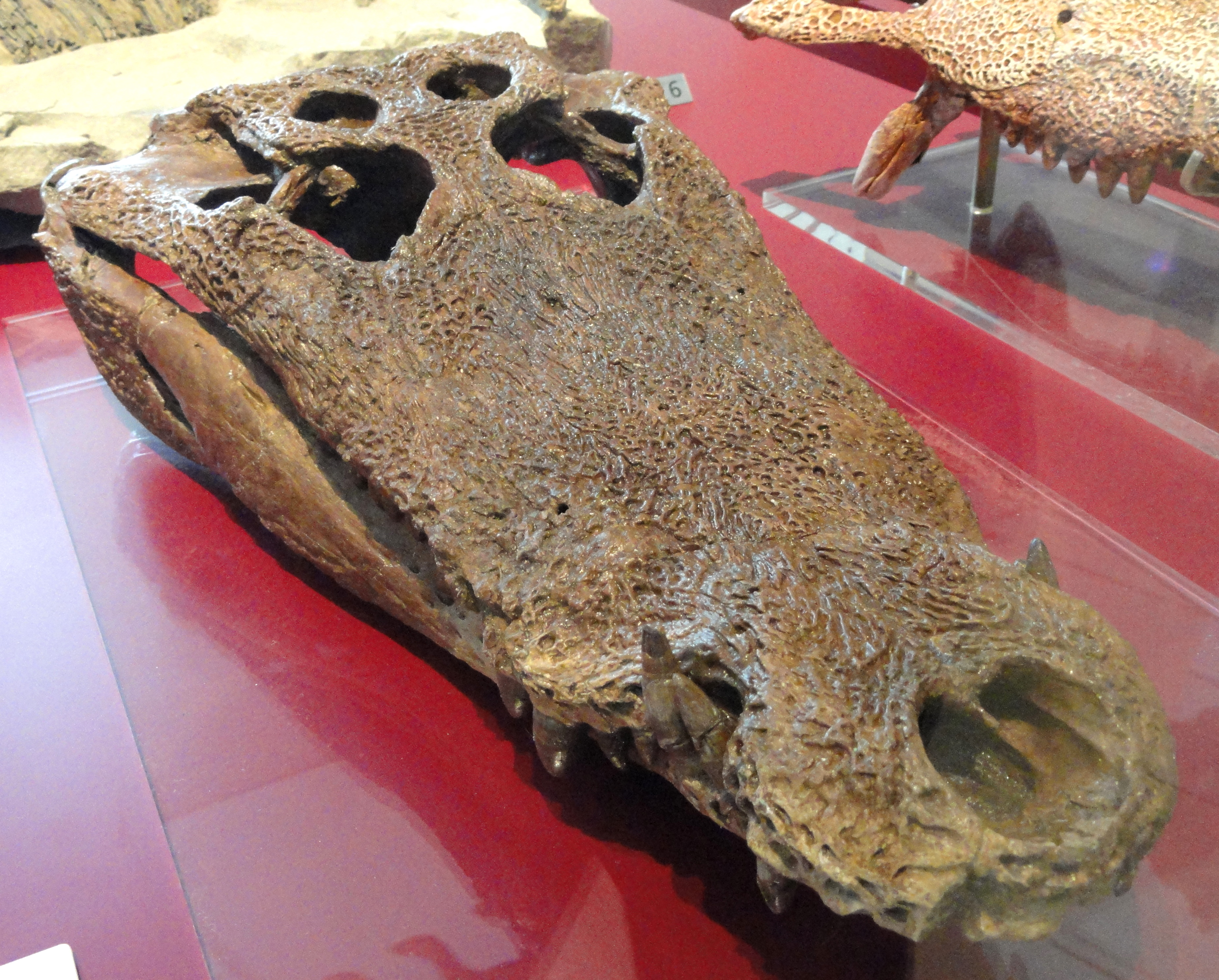
- Fossilized skull of the Late Cretaceous alligator relative Leidyosuchus
  †Leidyosuchus
- Lemmiscus
  - †Lemmiscus curtatus
- †Leptocyon
- Lepus
  - †Lepus alleni
  - †Lepus californicus
  - †Lepus townsendii
- †Listrognathosuchus
- †Longirostromeryx
- Lontra
  - †Lontra canadensis
- Loxia
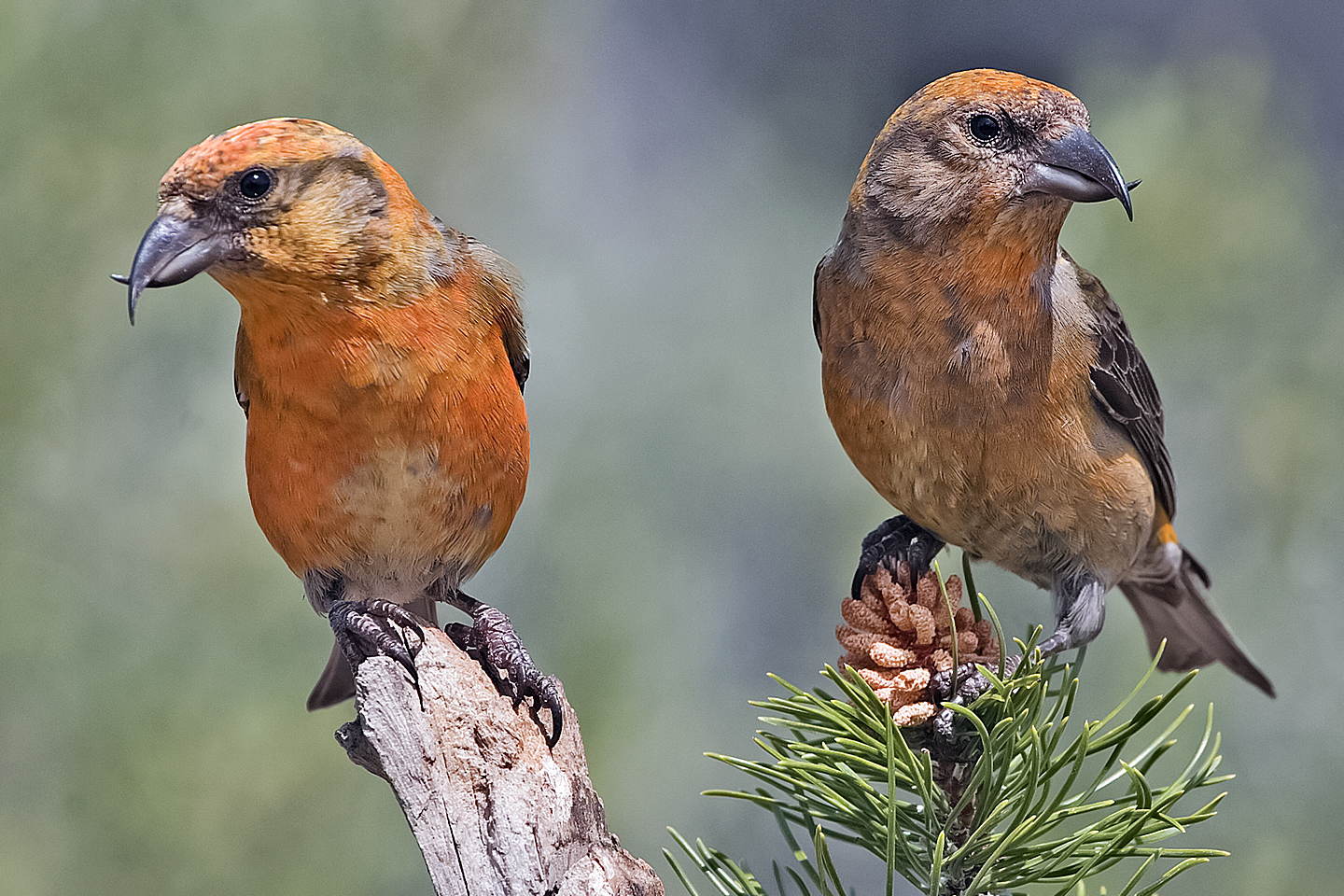
  - A living Loxia curvirostra, or red crossbill
    †Loxia curvirostra
- Lynx
  - †Lynx lynx
  - †Lynx rufus
- Macrocranion
- Magnolia
- †Mammut
  - †Mammut americanum
  - †Mammut raki – type locality for species
- †Mammuthus
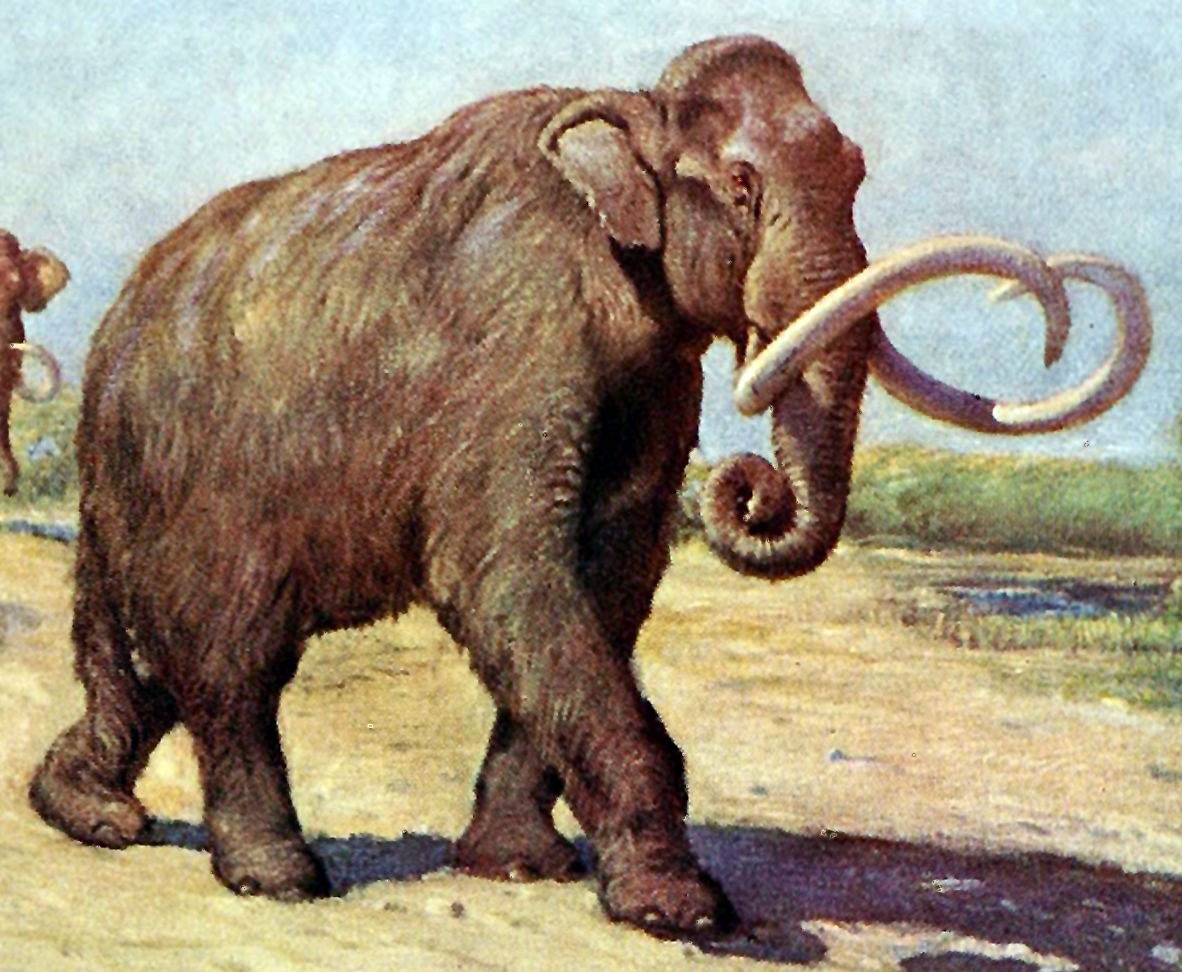
  - Life restoration of a herd of Mammuthus columbi, or Columbian mammoths. The extent of the fur depicted is hypothetical. Charles R. Knight (1909).
    †Mammuthus columbi
- Marmota
  - †Marmota flaviventris
- Martes
- Masticophis
  - †Masticophis flagellum – tentative report
- †Megahippus
- †Megalonyx
  - †Megalonyx leptostomus
  - †Megalonyx wheatleyi
- †Megatylopus
- Meleagris
  - †Meleagris gallopavo
- †Meniscotherium
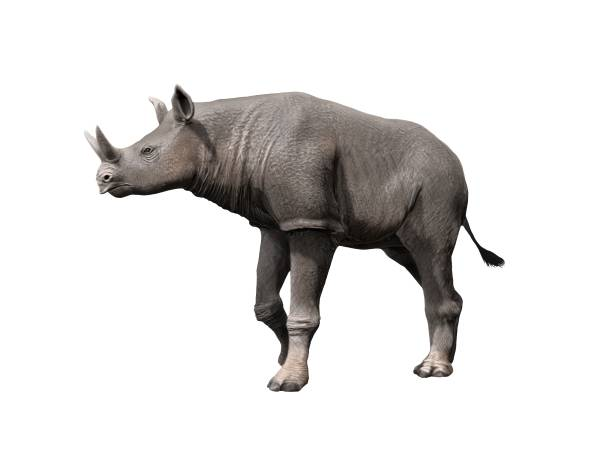
- Life restoration of the Miocene rhinoceros Menoceras
  †Menoceras
- Mephitis
  - †Mephitis mephitis
- Mergus – tentative report
- †Merychippus
- †Merychyus
- †Merycodus
- †Mesodma
  - †Mesodma thompsoni
- †Metatomarctus
- †Michenia
- †Microsyops
- †Microtomarctus
- Microtus
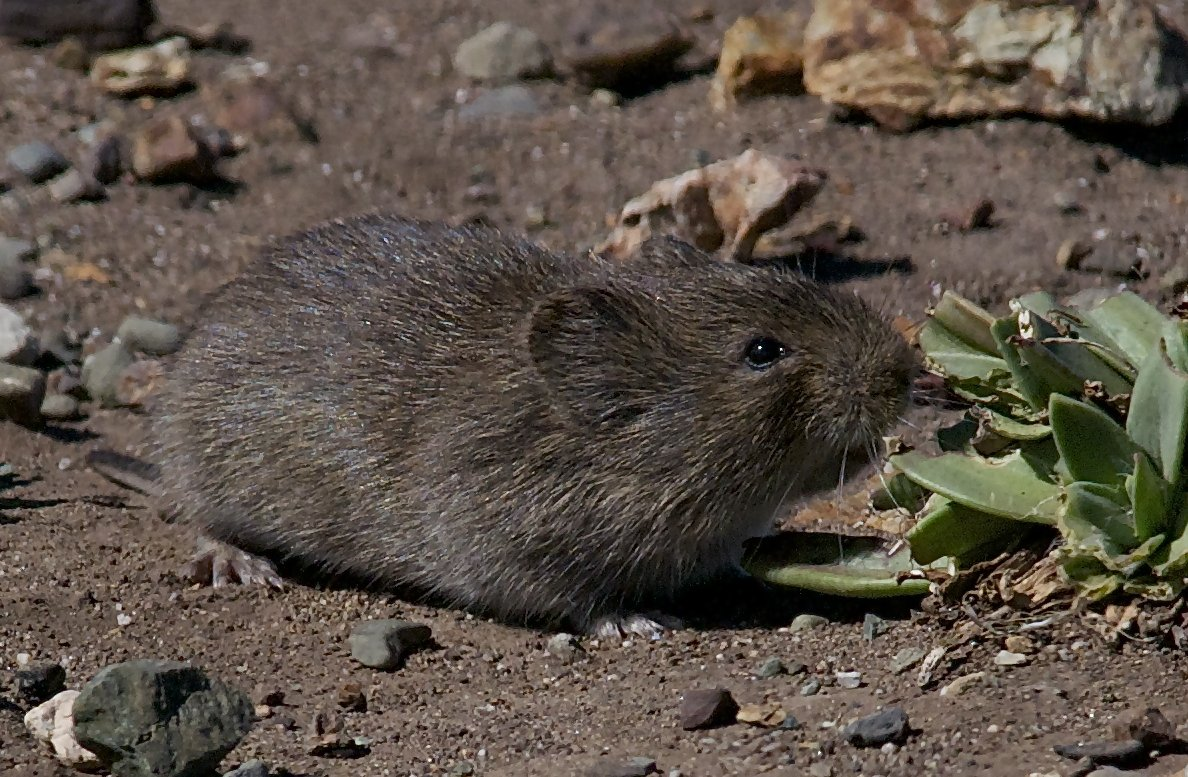
  - A living Microtus californicus, or California vole
    †Microtus californicus – or unidentified comparable form
  - †Microtus longicaudus
  - †Microtus mexicanus
  - †Microtus ochrogaster
  - †Microtus pennsylvanicus
- †Mimetodon
  - †Mimetodon krausei – type locality for species
- †Mithrandir
- Mustela
  - †Mustela richardsonii
  - A living Mustela nigripes, or black-footed ferret
    †Mustela nigripes
- Myotis
  - †Myotis lucifugus – tentative report
  - †Myotis thysanodes
  - †Myotis velifer
- †Nannippus
- †Navahoceros
  - †Navahoceros fricki – type locality for species
- †Navajosuchus – type locality for genus
  - †Navajosuchus mooki – type locality for species
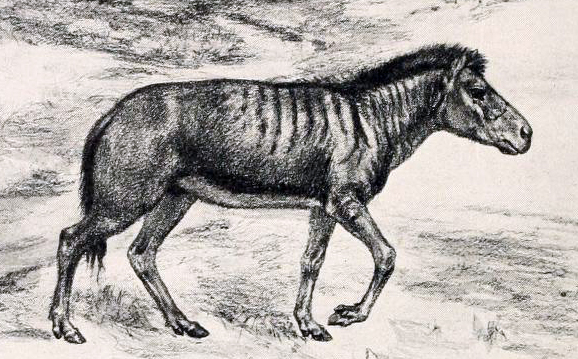
- Life restoration of a herd of Neohipparion. Robert Bruce Horsfall (1913).
  †Neohipparion
- Neophrontops
  - †Neophrontops americanus
- Neogale
  - †Neogale frenata – or unidentified comparable form
- †Neoplagiaulax
  - †Neoplagiaulax macintyrei – type locality for species
  - †Neoplagiaulax macrotomeus
- Neotamias
  - †Neotamias dorsalis – tentative report
- Neotoma
  - †Neotoma albigula
  - †Neotoma cinerea
  - †Neotoma lepida
  - †Neotoma mexicana
  - †Neotoma micropus
  - †Neotoma stephensi
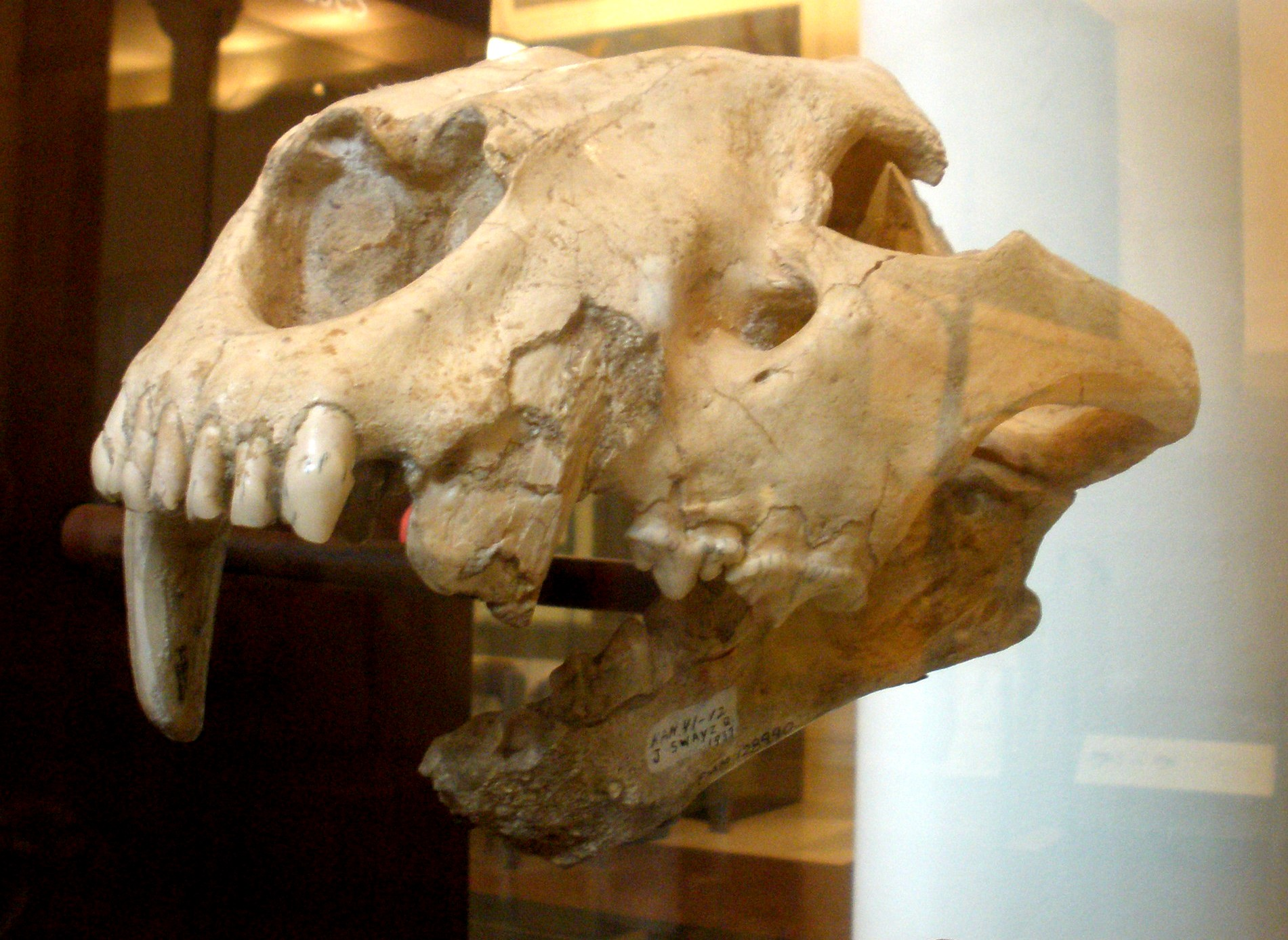
- Fossilized partial cranium of the Miocene saber-toothed cat Nimravides
  †Nimravides
- †Notharctus
- †Nothrotherium
- Notiosorex
- †Odaxosaurus
  - †Odaxosaurus piger
- Odocoileus
  - †Odocoileus hemionus
  - †Odocoileus virginianus
- Ondatra
- Onychomys
  - †Onychomys leucogaster
  - †Onychomys torridus
- Oreamnos – or unidentified comparable form
  - †Oreamnos harringtoni
- Oreortyx
  - †Oreortyx picta
- Oryzomys – or unidentified comparable form
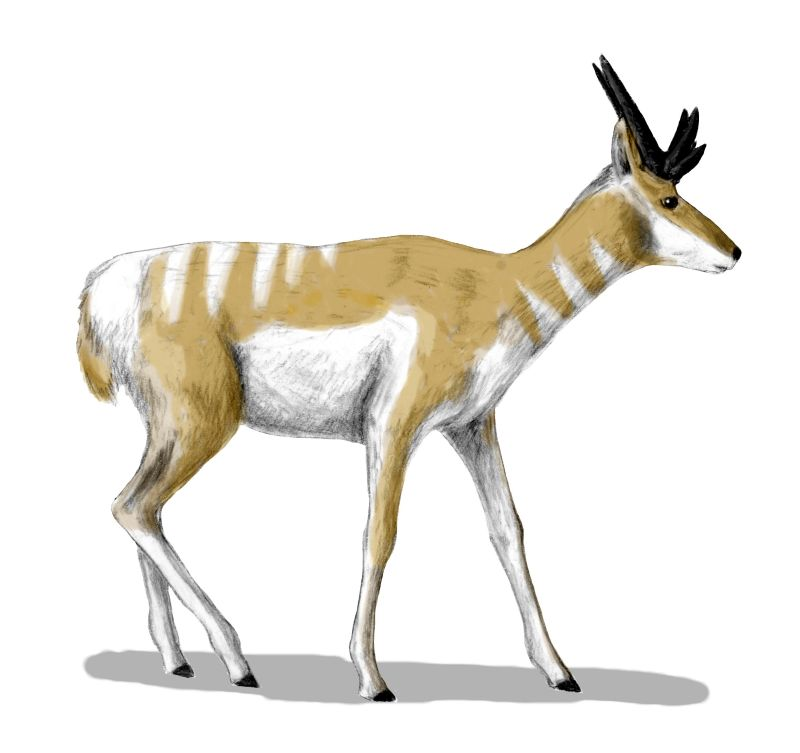
- Life restoration of the Miocene pronghorn Osbornoceros
  †Osbornoceros
  - †Osbornoceros osborni – type locality for species
- †Osbornodon
- Otus – or unidentified comparable form
- Ovis
  - †Ovis canadensis
- †Oxyacodon
- †Oxyaena
- †Oxydactylus
- †Pachyaena
- †Palaeoryctes
- Panthera
  - †Panthera onca
- †Pantolambda
- Pappogeomys
- †Paracynarctus
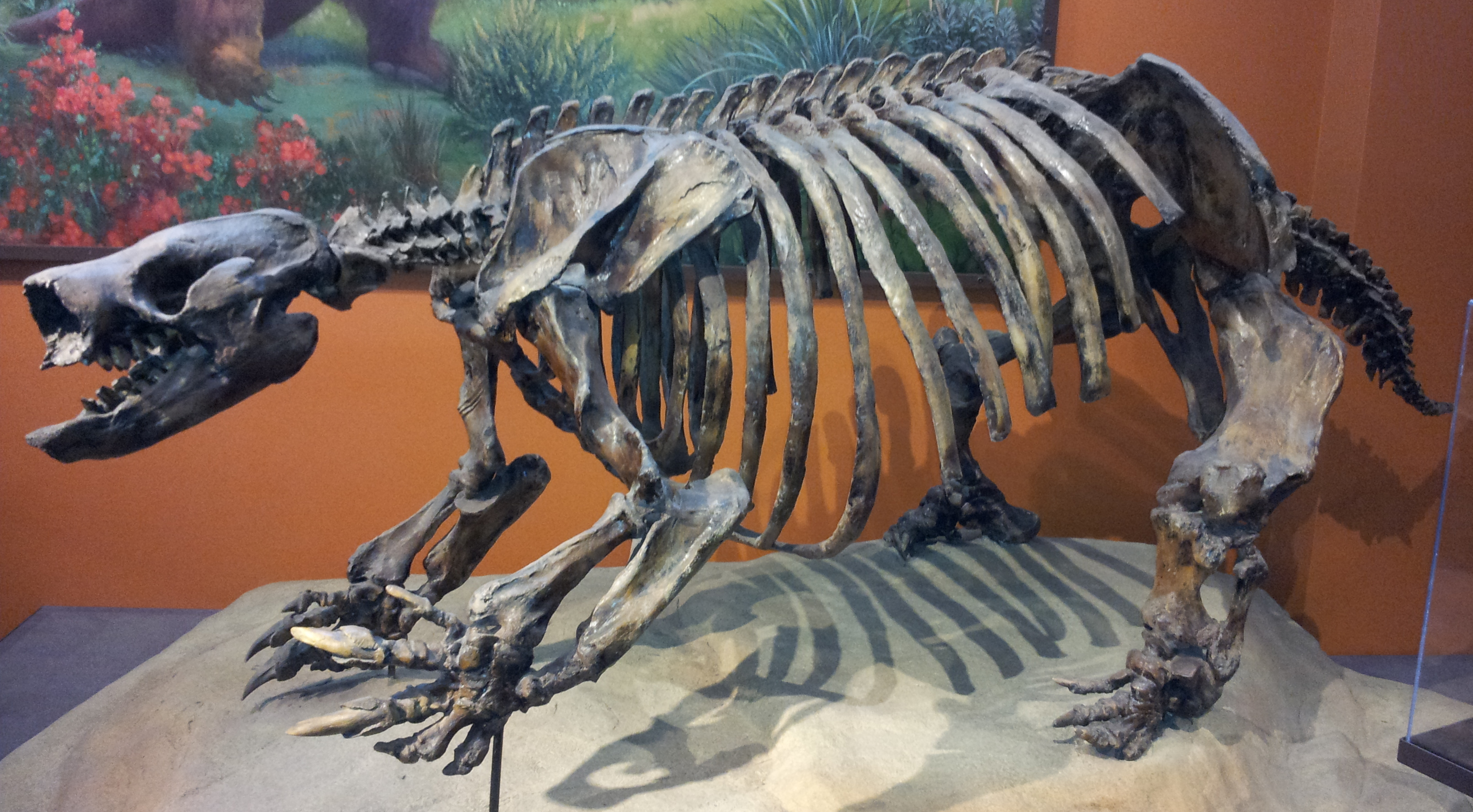
- Fossilized skeleton of the Pliocene-Pleistocene ground sloth Paramylodon
  †Paramylodon
  - †Paramylodon harlani – or unidentified comparable form
- †Paramys
- †Paratomarctus
- †Parectypodus
  - †Parectypodus trovessartianus
  - †Parectypodus vanvaleni – type locality for species
- †Parvitragulus
- †Pelycodus
  - †Pelycodus jarrovii
- †Peraceras
- Perognathus
  - †Perognathus flavus
- Peromyscus
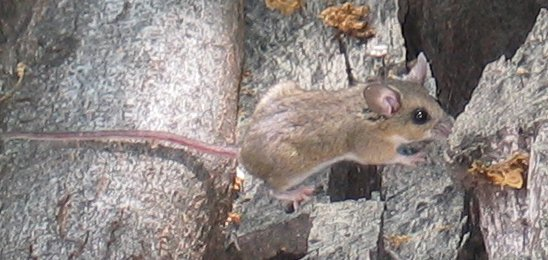
  - A living Peromyscus boylii, or brush mouse
    †Peromyscus boylii
  - †Peromyscus crinitus – or unidentified comparable form
  - †Peromyscus difficilis
  - †Peromyscus eremicus
  - †Peromyscus maniculatus
  - †Peromyscus truei
- Persea
- Phalacrocorax
  - †Phalacrocorax auritus
- †Phenacodus
- Phenacomys
  - †Phenacomys intermedius
- Phrynosoma
  - †Phrynosoma cornutum
  - †Phrynosoma douglassi
  - †Phrynosoma modestum
- Pituophis
  - †Pituophis catenifer
- Platanus
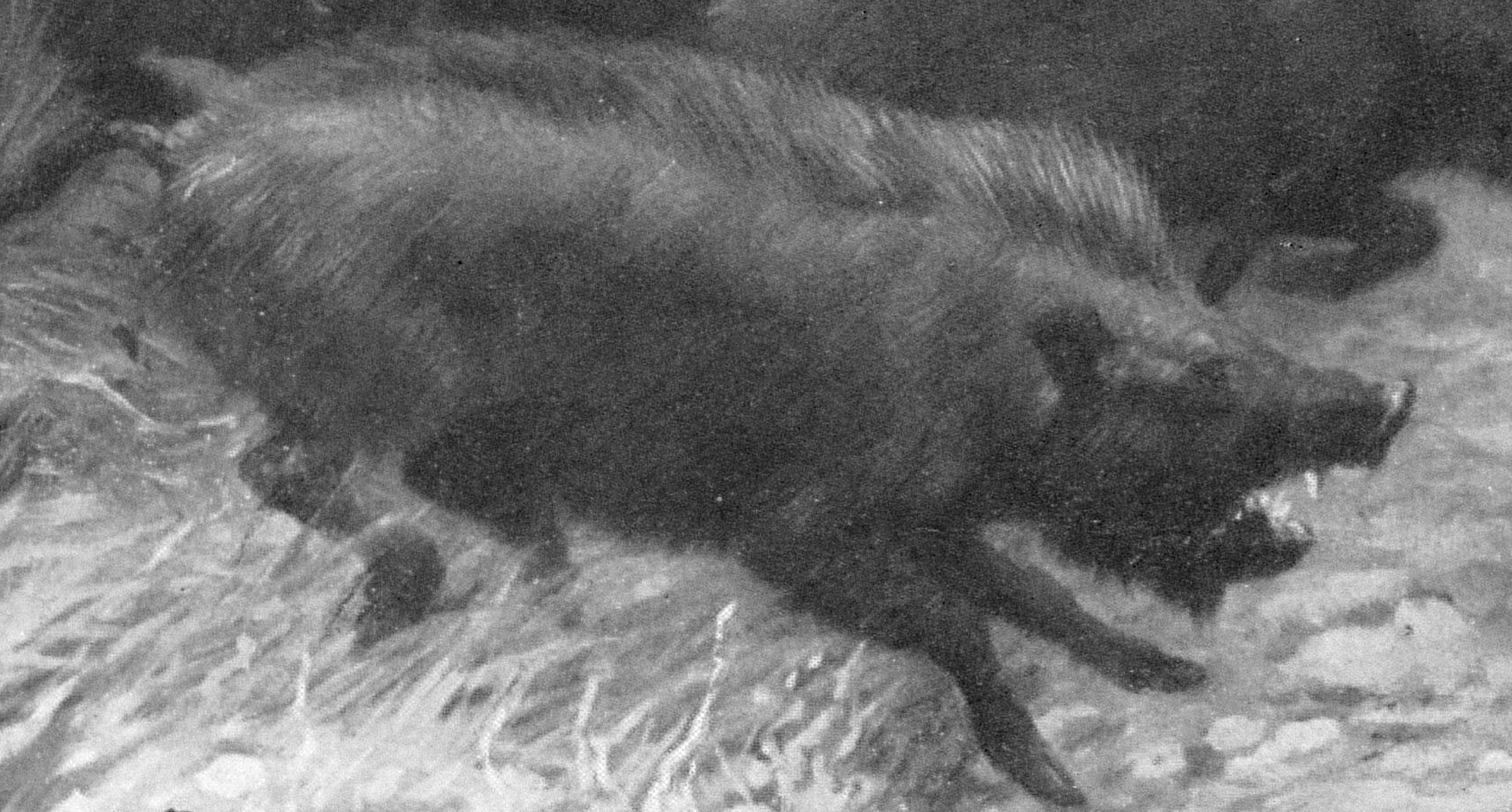
- Restoration of a herd of alarmed Miocene-Pleistocene peccaries of the genus Platygonus. Charles R. Knight (1922).
  †Platygonus
  - †Platygonus compressus
- Plecotus
- †Pleiolama
- †Plesiogulo
- †Pliohippus
- †Pliometanastes
- †Plithocyon
- Podiceps
- †Procamelus
- †Promartes
- †Promerycochoerus
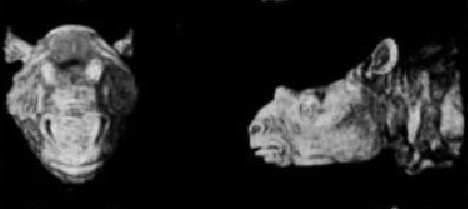
- Restorative models in multiple views of the Eocene brontothere Protitanotherium (figure 3)
  †Protitanotherium
- †Protohippus
- †Protolabis
- †Protomarctus
- †Psalidocyon
- Pseudacris
  - †Pseudacris triseriata
- †Pseudaelurus
- †Pseudhipparion
- †Pseudocyon
- †Pseudoprotoceras
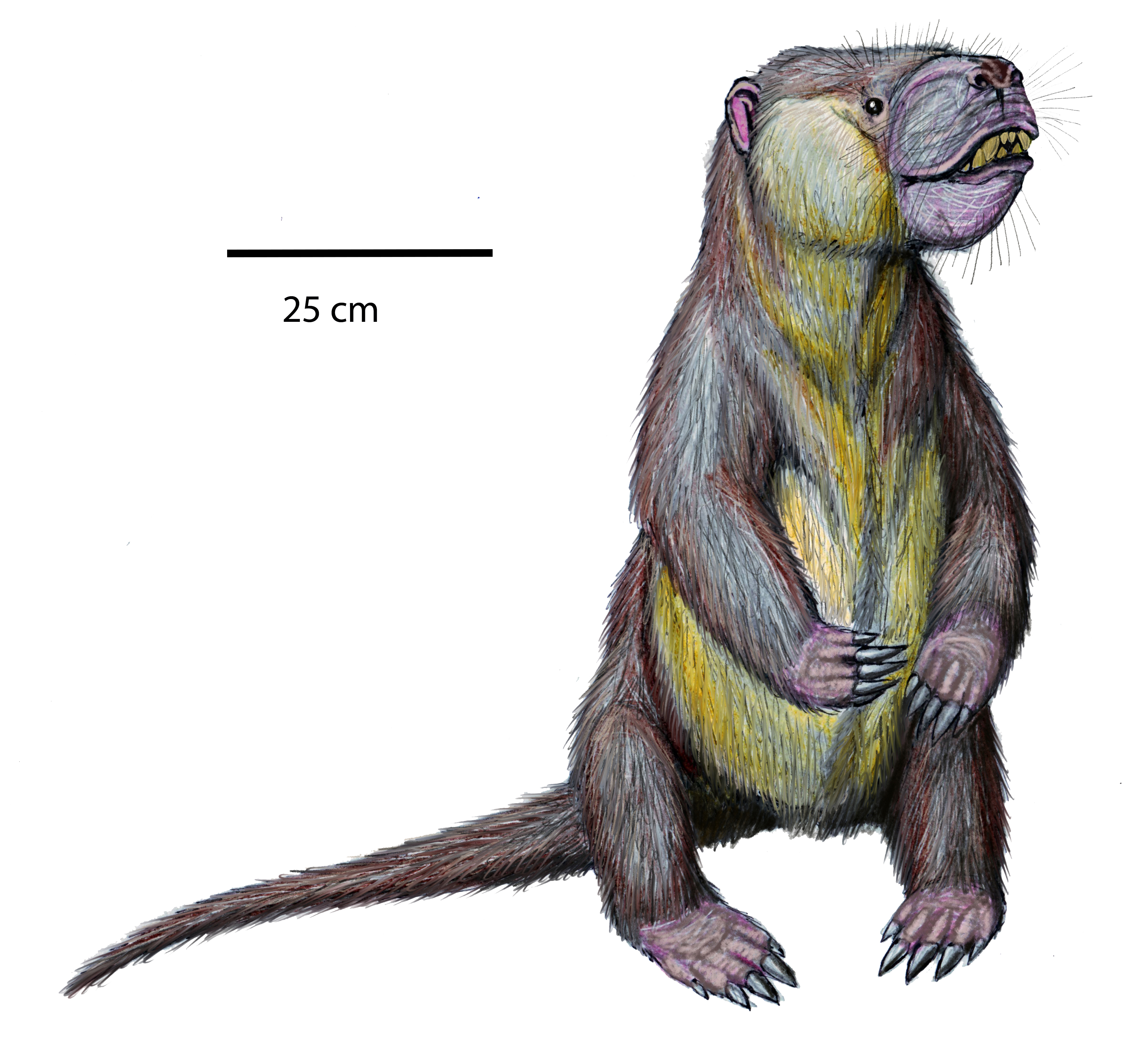
- Life restoration of the Paleocene taeniodont mammal Psittacotherium multifragum
  †Psittacotherium
- †Ptilodus
  - †Ptilodus mediaevus
  - †Ptilodus tsosiensis – type locality for species
- Puma
  - †Puma concolor
- †Ramoceros
- †Rana
  - †Rana pipiens
- Reithrodontomys
  - †Reithrodontomys megalotis
- †Rhamnus
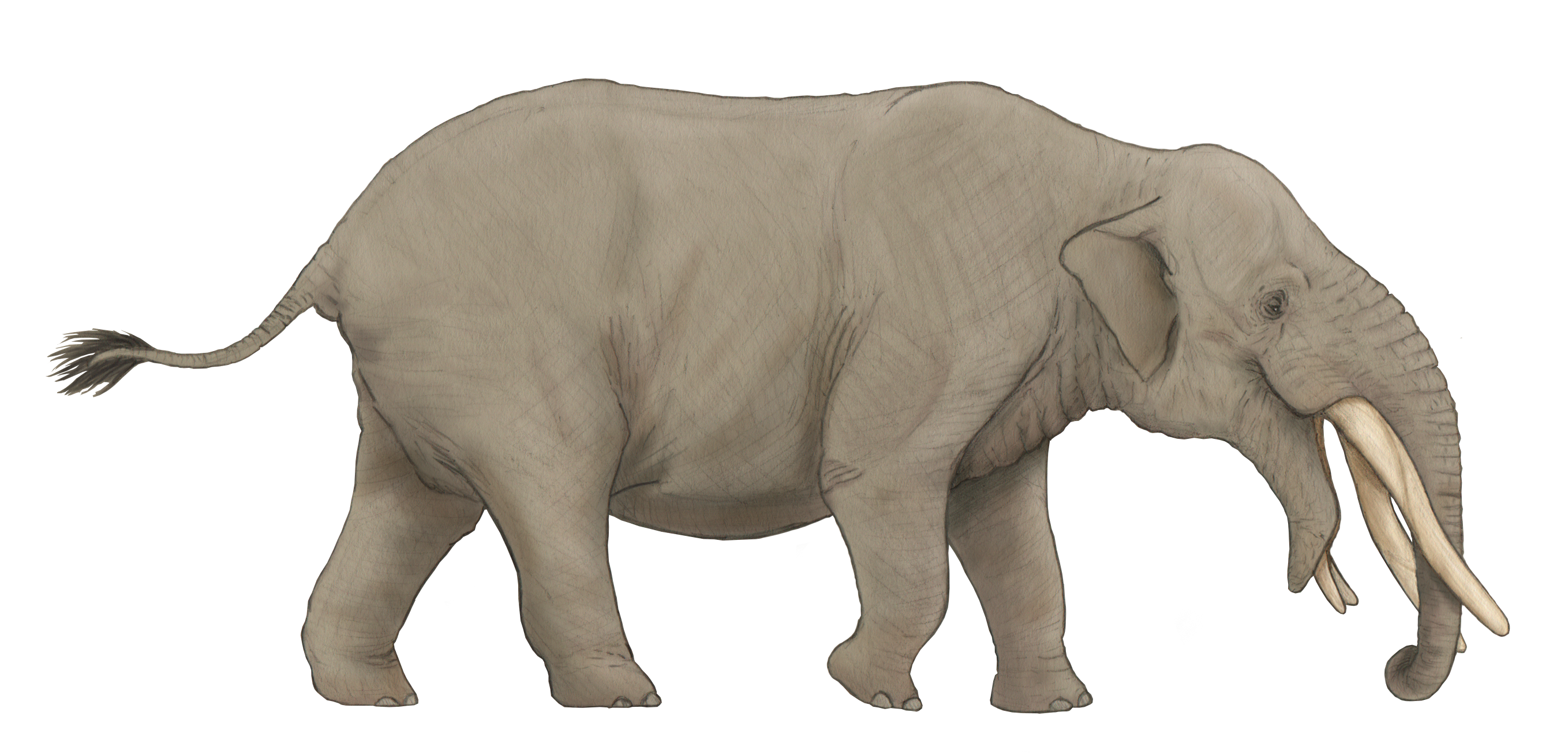
- Restoration of the Miocene-Pliocene elephant relative Rhynchotherium
  †Rhynchotherium
- Sabal
- †Salpinctes – or unidentified comparable form
  - †Salpinctes obsoletus
- Salvadora
- †Saniwa
  - †Saniwa ensidens
- Scalopus
- Scaphiopus
- †Scaphohippus
- Sceloporus
  - †Sceloporus undulatus
- Sciurus
  - †Sciurus aberti
- Sigmodon
  - †Sigmodon hispidus
- †Sinopa
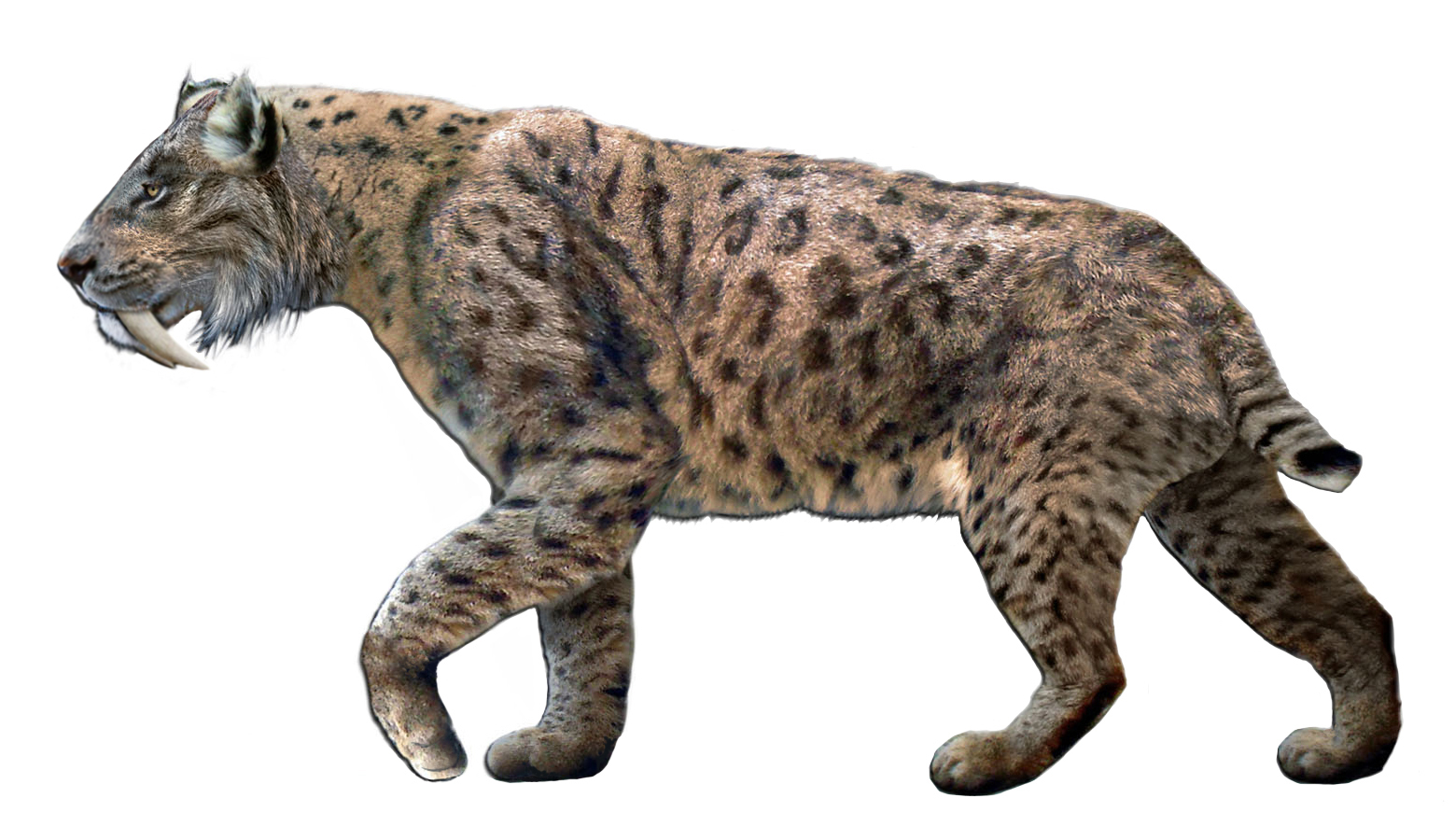
- Life restoration of the Pleistocene-Holocene saber-tooth cat Smilodon
  †Smilodon
  - †Smilodon gracilis
- Sorex
  - †Sorex merriami
- Spea
  - †Spea bombifrons
  - †Spea hammondii
- Spermophilus
  - †Spermophilus lateralis
  - †Spermophilus spilosoma
  - †Spermophilus tridecemlineatus
  - †Spermophilus variegatus
- Spilogale
  - †Spilogale putorius
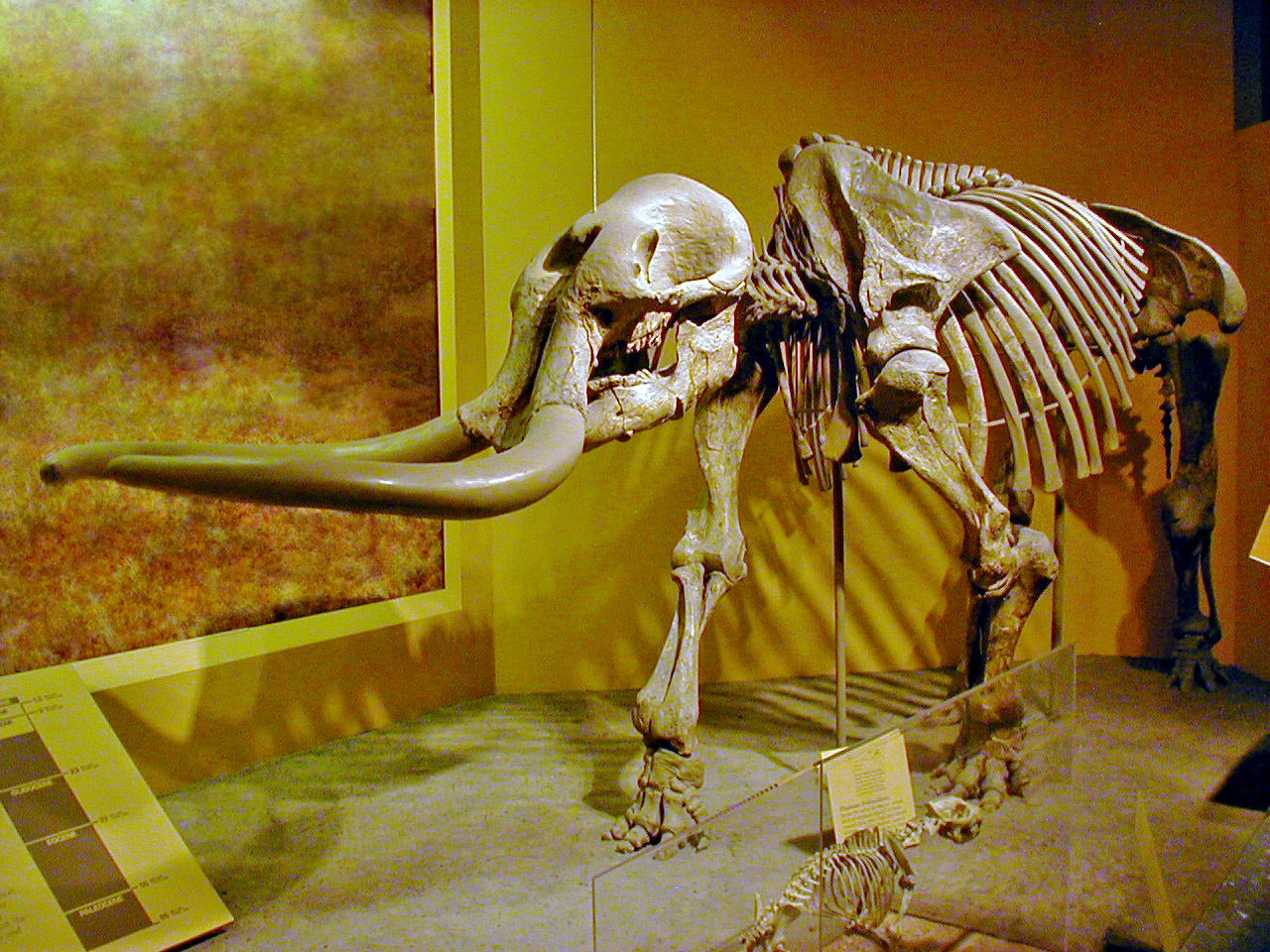
- Mounted fossilized skeleton of the Pliocene-Pleistocene elephant relative Stegomastodon
  †Stegomastodon
  - †Stegomastodon mirificus
- †Stenomylus
  - †Stenomylus gracilis – or unidentified comparable form
- †Stockoceros
- Strix
  - †Strix occidentalis – or unidentified comparable form
- Sylvilagus
  - †Sylvilagus audubonii
  - †Sylvilagus floridanus
  - †Sylvilagus nuttallii
- Tadarida
  - †Tadarida brasiliensis
- †Taeniolabis
  - †Taeniolabis taoensis
- Tamias
- Tapirus
- Taxidea
  - †Taxidea taxus
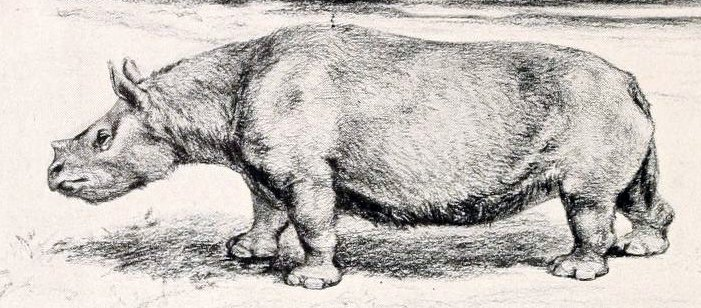
- Restoration of the Miocene-Pliocene rhinoceros Teleoceras
  †Teleoceras
- †Telmatherium
- Terrapene – tentative report
  - †Terrapene ornata
- †Tetraclaenodon
- Thamnophis
  - †Thamnophis proximus
- Thomomys
  - †Thomomys bottae
  - †Thomomys talpoides
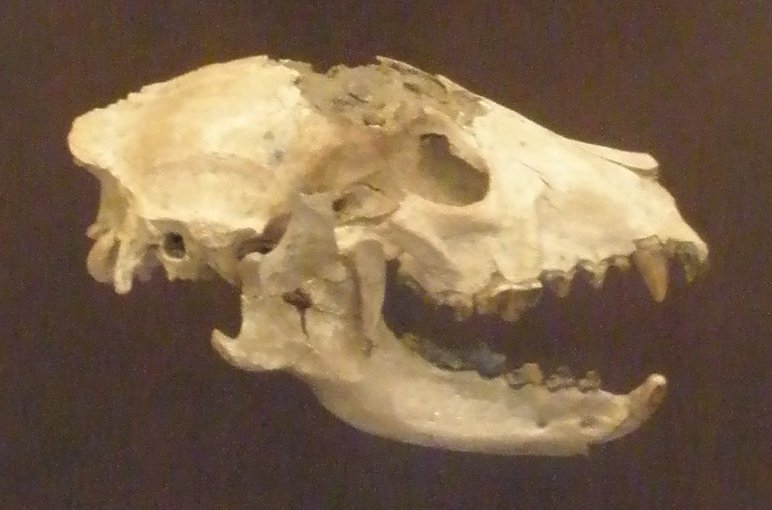
- Fossilized skull of the Miocene bone-crushing dog Tomarctus
  †Tomarctus
  - †Tomarctus brevirostris
  - †Tomarctus hippophaga
- †Triisodon
  - †Triisodon quivirensis
- Trionyx
- Tympanuchus
  - †Tympanuchus pallidicinctus
- Tyto
  - †Tyto furcata
- †Uintacyon
- Urocyon
  - †Urocyon cinereoargenteus
- †Urosaurus – or unidentified comparable form
  - †Urosaurus ornatus
- Ursus
  - †Ursus americanus
- †Ustatochoerus
- †Valenia
- †Vulpavus
- Vulpes
  - †Vulpes velox
  - †Vulpes vulpes
- Xanthocephalus
  - †Xanthocephalus xanthocephalus
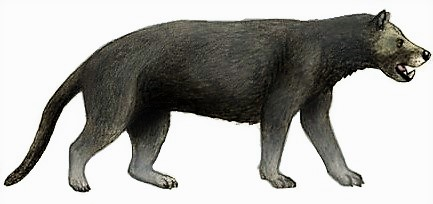
- Life restoration of the Miocene bear dog Ysengrinia
  †Ysengrinia – or unidentified comparable form
- Zenaida
  - †Zenaida macroura
- †Zenaidura
  - †Zenaidura macroura
