= Blakely Sandstone =

Geologic formation in Arkansas and Oklahoma, United States

- Stratigraphic range: Ordovician
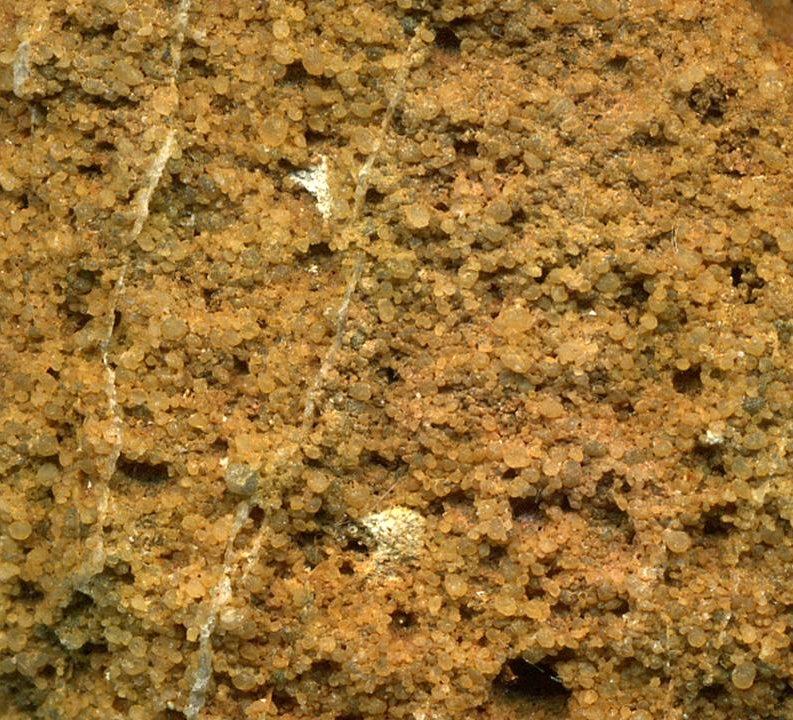
- Blakely Sandstone (Coleman Quartz Mine, Arkansas)
- Type: Formation
- Unit of: none
- Sub-units: none
- Underlies: Womble Shale
- Overlies: Mazarn Shale
- Thickness: up to 700 feet

Lithology
- Primary: Sandstone

Location
- Region: Arkansas, Oklahoma
- Country: United States

Type section
- Named for: Blakely Mountain, Garland County, Arkansas
- Named by: Albert Homer Purdue

The Blakely Sandstone is a Middle Ordovician geologic formation in the Ouachita Mountains of Arkansas and Oklahoma. First described in 1892, this unit was not named until 1909 by Albert Homer Purdue in his study of the Ouachita Mountains of Arkansas. Purdue had initially named this unit the Caddo Shale at a 1907 Geological Society of America meeting, but later redefined and renamed the unit as the Ouachita Shale. He again renamed the unit to the Blakely Sandstone in a letter to Edward Oscar Ulrich, to which Ulrich used in a 1911 publication, becoming the first reference using this name. Ulrich assigned the Blakely Mountain in Garland County, Arkansas as the type locality, but did not designate a stratotype. As of 2017, a reference section for this unit has yet to be designated.

== Paleofauna ==
=== Conodonts ===
- Cordylodus

C. horridus

- Hisiodella

H. holodentata

- Leptochirognathus

L. quadratus

- Paraprioniodus

P. costatus

- Periodon

P. aculeatus

- Spinodus

=== Graptolites ===
- Dichograptus
- Didymograptus

D. euodes
D. manus
D. spinosus

- Glossograptus

G. echinatus
G. horridus

- Phyllograptus
- Tetragraptus

== See also ==
- List of fossiliferous stratigraphic units in Arkansas
- Paleontology in Arkansas
