= Stanley Shale =

Geologic formation in Arkansas and Oklahoma, United States

- Stratigraphic range: Mississippian
- Type: Formation
- Unit of: none
- Sub-units: Hatton Tuff Lentil (AR/OK), Hot Springs Sandstone (AR) Member, Chickasaw Creek Shale Formation (OK), Moyers Formation (OK), Tenmile Creek Formation (OK)
- Underlies: Jackfork Sandstone
- Overlies: Arkansas Novaculite
- Thickness: 3,500 to 10,000+ feet

Lithology
- Primary: Shale

Location
- Region: Arkansas, Oklahoma
- Country: United States

Type section
- Named for: Stanley, Pushmataha County, Oklahoma
- Named by: Joseph A. Taff

The Stanley Shale, or Stanley Group, is a Mississippian stratigraphic unit in the Ouachita Mountains of Arkansas and Oklahoma. First described in Arkansas in 1892, this unit was not named until 1902 by J.A. Taff in his study of the Ouachita Mountains of Oklahoma. Taff assigned the town of Stanley in Pushmataha County, Oklahoma as the type locality, but did not designate a stratotype. After introduction into Arkansas in 1909 by Albert Homer Purdue, the unit was redefined in 1918, when the formation known as the Fork Mountain Slate was abandoned and partially combined into the Stanley Shale. As of 2017, a reference section for the Stanley Shale has yet to be designated.

The Stanley Shale is recognized as a geologic formation with two sub-units in Arkansas, the Hatton Tuff Lentil and the Hot Springs Sandstone Member, however, several others have been proposed. These include the Chickasaw Creek Member, Chickasaw Creek Tuff, Gap Ridge Sandstone Member, Moyers Member, Parker Hill Sandstone Member, Polk County Ash Bed, and Tenmile Creek Member. In 1963, it was first proposed to raise the rank of the Stanley Shale Formation to Group status in Arkansas, with proposed sub-units consisting of the Chickasaw Creek Formation, Moyers Formation (with the Gap Ridge Sandstone and Parker Hill Sandstone Members), and Ten Mile Creek Formation. However, the proposal was not accepted and the unit remained as a formation.

In Oklahoma, this unit is recognized as a group called the Stanley Group composed of three formations: the Chickasaw Creek Shale Formation, the Moyers Formation, and the Tenmile Creek Formation. The Hatton Tuff Lentil, recognized in Arkansas, is also in Oklahoma as a unit of the Tenmile Creek Formation. Several informal members have been noted including the Smithville chert lentil, the Faith chert member, and the Chickasaw Creek tuff among others

Mining in the Stanley Shale is limited to cinnabar, barite, and quartz. Cinnabar is primarily used for mercury, however, production in Arkansas essentially ended by the mid-20th century. Barite mining, mostly useful for oil and gas drilling fluid, is ongoing.

== Paleoflora ==
- Adiantites

A. stanleyanus

- Alloiopteris

A. arkansana

- Aphlebia
- Archaeocalamites

A. coralloides
A. stanleyensis

- Calymmatotheca
- Calamites

C. menae
C. miseri

- Lepidodendron

L. subclypeatum

- Lepidostrobus

L. peniculus

- Neuropteris

N. elrodi

- Palmatopteris

P. subgeniculata

- Rhabdocarpos

R. secalicus

- Rhodea

R. goepperti

- Sphenophyllum

S. arkansanum

- Sphenopteridium

S. dawsoni

- Sphenopteris
- Stigmaria
- Trigonocarpum

T. gillhami
T. vallisjohanni

- Wardia

W. suspecta

== See also ==
- List of fossiliferous stratigraphic units in Arkansas
- Paleontology in Arkansas
