= Jackfork Sandstone =

Geologic formation in Oklahoma and Arkansas, United States

- Stratigraphic range: Pennsylvanian
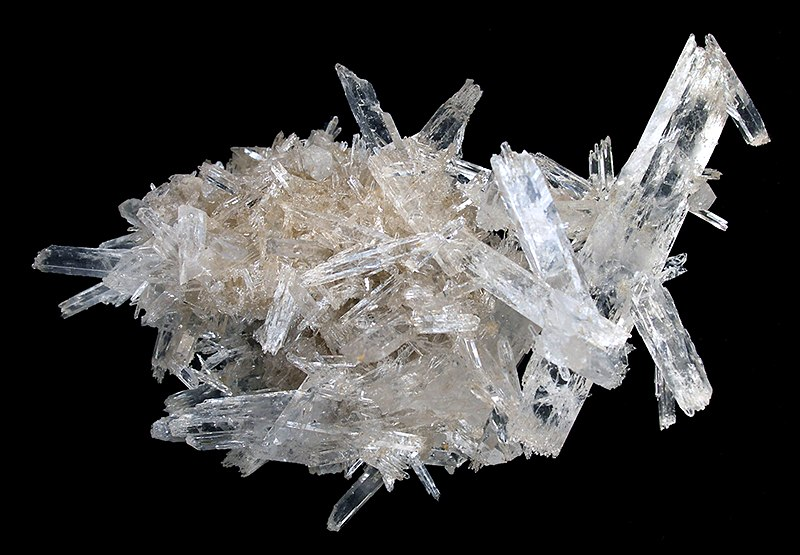
- Quartz from the Jackfork Sandstone
- Type: Formation
- Underlies: Johns Valley Shale
- Overlies: Stanley Shale
- Thickness: 3,500 to 6,000 feet

Lithology
- Primary: Sandstone
- Other: Shale, conglomerate

Location
- Region: Ouachita Mountains
- Country: United States

Type section
- Named for: Jackfork Mountain, Pittsburg and Pushmataha Counties, Oklahoma
- Named by: J. A. Taff, 1902

The Jackfork Sandstone, also referred to as the Jackfork Group, is a geologic formation associated with the Ouachita Fold and Thrust Belt exposed in western Arkansas and southeastern Oklahoma. It is named for Jackfork Mountain in Pittsburg and Pushmataha counties, Oklahoma.

The Jackfork Sandstone is a thin- to massive-bedded, fine- to coarse-grained, brown, tan, or gray quartzitic sandstone with subordinate brown, silty sandstone and dark gray shale. It outcrops from Pulaski County, Arkansas in the east to Atoka County, Oklahoma in the west, a distance of over 200 miles. It is highly weather-resistant, resulting in a continuous chain of prominent ridges, including Rich Mountain, the second highest natural point in the Ouachita Mountains.

== Paleoflora ==
- Aphlebia

A. parksii

- Archaeocalamites

A. stanleyensis

- Bothrodendron
- Calamites

C. inopinatus
C. menae
C. miseri

- Lepidodendron

L. subclypeatum

- Lepidostrobus

L. peniculus

- Neuropteris

N. antecedens

- Rhabdocarpos

R. costatulus

- Rhynchogonium

R. choctavense

- Sigillaria
- Trigonocarpum

T. gillhami
T. vallisjohanni
