= Mazarn Shale =

Geologic formation in Arkansas and Oklahoma, United States

- Stratigraphic range: Ordovician
- Type: Formation
- Unit of: none
- Sub-units: none
- Underlies: Blakely Sandstone
- Overlies: Crystal Mountain Sandstone
- Thickness: 1000 to 2500+ feet

Lithology
- Primary: Shale

Location
- Region: Arkansas, Oklahoma
- Country: United States

Type section
- Named for: Mazarn Creek, Montgomery County, Arkansas
- Named by: Hugh Dinsmore Miser

The Mazarn Shale is an Early Ordovician geologic formation in the Ouachita Mountains of Arkansas and Oklahoma. This interval was first described in 1892, but remained unnamed until 1918 as part of a study by U.S. Geological Survey geologist Hugh Dinsmore Miser.

== Paleofauna ==
=== Graptolites ===
- Caryocaris

C. wrighti

- Cryptograptus

C. antennarius

- Didymograptus

D. caduceus
D. caduceus nana
D. extensus
D. filiformis
D. nitidus
D. similis

- Diplograptus
- Glossograptus

G. hystrix

- Mesograptus
- Phyllograptus

P. typus

- Retiograptus
- Tetragraptus

T. clarkei
T. fruticosus
T. quadribrachiatus
T. pendens
T. serra
T. similis

== See also ==
- List of fossiliferous stratigraphic units in Arkansas
- Paleontology in Arkansas
