= Womble Shale =

Geologic formation in the United States

- Stratigraphic range: Ordovician
- Type: Formation
- Unit of: none
- Sub-units: none
- Underlies: Bigfork Chert
- Overlies: Blakely Sandstone
- Thickness: 500 to 1200 feet

Lithology
- Primary: Shale

Location
- Region: Arkansas, Oklahoma
- Country: United States

Type section
- Named for: Womble, Montgomery County, Arkansas
- Named by: Hugh Dinsmore Miser

The Womble Shale is a Middle Ordovician geologic formation in the Ouachita Mountains of Arkansas and Oklahoma. First described in 1892, this unit was not named until 1909 by Albert Homer Purdue in his study of the Ouachita Mountains of Arkansas, where he named this unit as part of the upper Ouachita Shale and the Stringtown Shale. In 1918, U.S. Geological Survey geologist, Hugh Dinsmore Miser, replaced Purdue's nomenclature with the Womble Shale. Miser assigned the town of Womble (now called Norman) in Montgomery County, Arkansas as the type locality. As of 2017, a reference section for this unit has yet to be designated.

== Paleofauna ==
=== Bryozoa ===
- Rhinidictya

=== Graptolites ===
- Azygograptus
- Brygraptus
- Climacograptus
  - C. bicornis
  - C. bicornis var. peltifer
  - C. caudatus
  - C. parvus
  - C. pultifer
- Cryptograptus
  - C. insectiformis
  - C. tricornis
- Desmograptus
- Dicellograptus
  - D. diapason
  - D. divaricatus
  - D. gurleyi
  - D. intorius
  - D. parvangulus
  - D. rectus
  - D. rigidus
  - D. sextans
- Dicranograptus
  - D. arkansasensis
  - D. nicholsoni
  - D. nicholsoni var. diapason
  - D. nicholsoni var. parvangulus
  - D. parvangulus
  - D. ramosus
  - D. spinifer
- Dictyonema
- Didymograptus
  - D. sagitticaulis
  - D. sagitticaulus var. minimus
  - D. sparsus
  - D. superstes
- Diplograptus
  - D. acutus
  - D. (Glyptograptus) angustifolius
  - D. basilicus
  - D. euglyphus
  - D. incisus
  - D. truncatus abbreviatus
- Glossograptus
  - G. ciliatus
  - G. horridus
  - G. quadrimucronatus var. maximus
- Glyptograptus
  - G. angustifolius
  - G. englyphus
- Lasiograptus
  - L. bimucronatus
  - L. mucronatus
- Leptograptus
  - L. patulosus
- Mesograptus
- Nemagraptus
  - N. gracilis
- Orthograptus
- Phyllograptus
- Retiograptus
  - R. geinitzianus
  - R. quadrimucronatus cornutus
- Thamnograptus
  - T. capillaris

== See also ==
- List of fossiliferous stratigraphic units in Arkansas
- Paleontology in Arkansas
