= Bigfork Chert =

Geologic formation in Arkansas and Oklahoma, United States

- Stratigraphic range: Ordovician
- Type: Formation
- Unit of: none
- Sub-units: none
- Underlies: Polk Creek Shale
- Overlies: Womble Shale
- Thickness: 450 to 750 feet

Lithology
- Primary: Chert

Location
- Region: Arkansas, Oklahoma
- Country: United States

Type section
- Named for: Big Fork, Polk County, Arkansas
- Named by: Albert Homer Purdue

The Bigfork Chert is a Middle to Late Ordovician geologic formation in the Ouachita Mountains of Arkansas and Oklahoma. First described in 1892, this unit was not named until 1909 by Albert Homer Purdue in his study of the Ouachita Mountains of Arkansas. Purdue assigned the town of Big Fork in Polk County, Arkansas as the type locality, but did not designate a stratotype. As of 2017, a reference section for this unit has yet to be designated. The Bigfork Chert is known to produce planerite, turquoise, variscite, and wavellite minerals.

== Paleofauna ==
=== Graptolites ===
- Climacograptus

C. antiquus

- Dicellograptus

D. divaricatus

- Diplograptus

D. trifidus
D. vulgatus

- Glyptograptus
- Lasiograptus

L. flaccidus

- Mesograptus

M. perexcavatus

- Orthograptus

O. quadrimucronatus

== See also ==
- List of fossiliferous stratigraphic units in Arkansas
- Paleontology in Arkansas
