= Collier Shale =

Geologic formation in the United States

- Stratigraphic range: Cambrian-Ordovician
- Type: Formation
- Unit of: none
- Sub-units: none
- Underlies: Crystal Mountain Sandstone

Lithology
- Primary: Shale

Location
- Region: Arkansas, Oklahoma
- Country: United States

Type section
- Named for: Collier Creek, Montgomery County, Arkansas
- Named by: Albert Homer Purdue

The Collier Shale is a geologic formation in the Ouachita Mountains of Arkansas and Oklahoma. Dating from the Late Cambrian to Early Ordovician periods, the Collier Shale is the oldest stratigraphic unit exposed in Arkansas. First described in 1892, this unit was not named until 1909 by Albert Homer Purdue in his study of the Ouachita Mountains of Arkansas. Purdue assigned the type locality to the headwaters of Collier Creek in Montgomery County, Arkansas, but did not designate a stratotype. As of 2017, a reference section for this unit has yet to be designated.

== Paleofauna ==
=== Conodonts ===
- Acanthodus
  - A. lineatus
- Acodus
  - A. oneotensis
- Chosonodina
  - C. herfurthi
- Cordylodus
  - C. angulatus
- Drepanodus
  - D. subarcuatus
- Loxodus
  - L. bransoni
- Oistodus
  - O. triangularis
- Paltodus
  - P. bassleri
- Phakelodus
  - P. tenuis

=== Trilobites ===
- Anechocephalus
  - A. aphelodermus
- Apachia
  - A. genaitholix
- Aphelotoxon
  - A. lumaleasa
- Buttsia
  - B. drabensis
- Cernuolimbus
  - C. monilis
- Cheilocephalus
  - C. brachyops
- Cliffia
  - C. lataegenae
  - C. magnacilis
- Comanchia
  - C. amplooculata
- Dellea
  - D. planafrons
  - D. suada
- Erixanium
  - E. lacunatum
- Housia
  - H. vacuna
- Iddingsia
  - I. hapsis
- Irvingella
  - I. major
- Jessievillia
  - J. radiatus
- Kindbladia
  - K. wichitaensis
- Kymagnostus
  - K. harti
- Linnarsonella
  - L. girtyi
- Neoagnostus
  - N. dilatus
- Parabolinoides
  - P. contractus
- Pseudagnostus
  - P. communis
- Pseudokingstonia
  - P. exotica
- Pterocephalia
  - P. sanctisabae
- Pulchricapitus
  - P. fetosus
- Pyttstrigis
  - P. dicilia
- Xenocheilos
  - X. minutum

== See also ==
- List of fossiliferous stratigraphic units in Arkansas
- Paleontology in Arkansas
