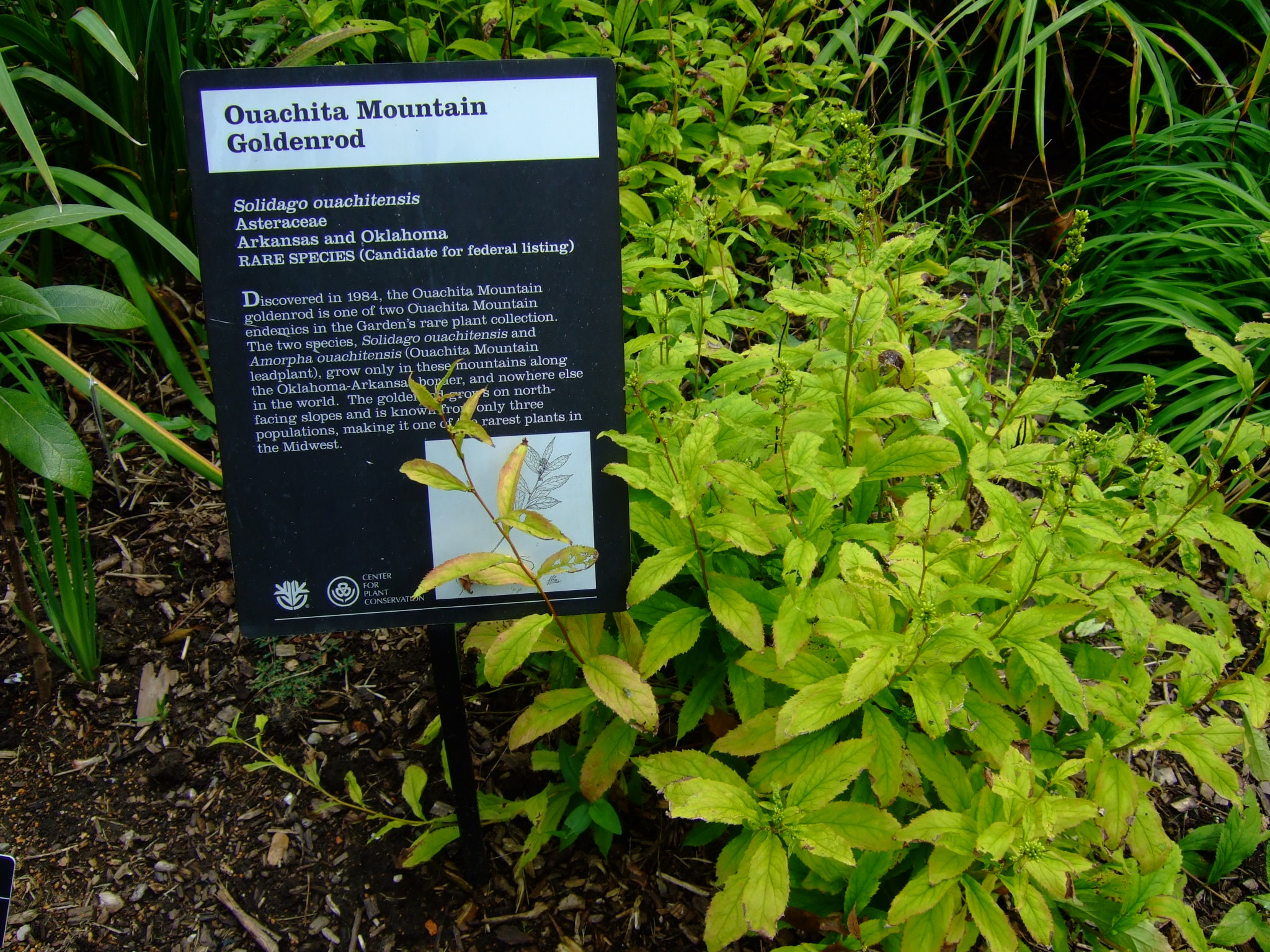
- specimen in Missouri Botanical Garden

Conservation status
- Vulnerable (NatureServe)

Scientific classification
- Kingdom: Plantae
- Clade: Tracheophytes
- Clade: Angiosperms
- Clade: Eudicots
- Clade: Asterids
- Order: Asterales
- Family: Asteraceae
- Genus: Solidago
- Species: S. ouachitensis

Binomial name
- Solidago ouachitensis C.E.S.Taylor & R.J.Taylor

= Solidago ouachitensis =

Species of flowering plant

Solidago ouachitensis is a North American species of flowering plants in the family Asteraceae known by the common name Ouachita Mountain goldenrod. It has a very limited range, found only in the Ouachita Mountains along the border between Arkansas and Oklahoma in the United States.

Solidago ouachitensis is a perennial herb growing up to about 1.1 meters (44 inches) in height. It produces one or more erect stems from a woody caudex. The serrated (toothed) leaves are 10 to 13 centimeters (4.0-5.2 inches) long around the middle of the plant and smaller higher on the stem. One plant will produce 25-50 bell-shaped flower heads. Each flower head usually contains one yellow ray floret and 4-5 disc florets. Flowering occurs in September and October.

Solidago ouachitensis is likely a relict of times when conditions were colder and wetter. It only occurs in the cooler, moister sites in the Ouachita Mountains, usually in wet forest habitat on north-facing slopes. Associated species include Magnolia tripetala, Fagus grandifolia, Acer rubrum, Quercus rubra, Aesculus glabra, Asarum canadense, Campanula americana, Panax quinquefolius, Toxicodendron radicans, and Hybanthus concolor.
