= Hot Springs National Park =

National park in Arkansas, United States

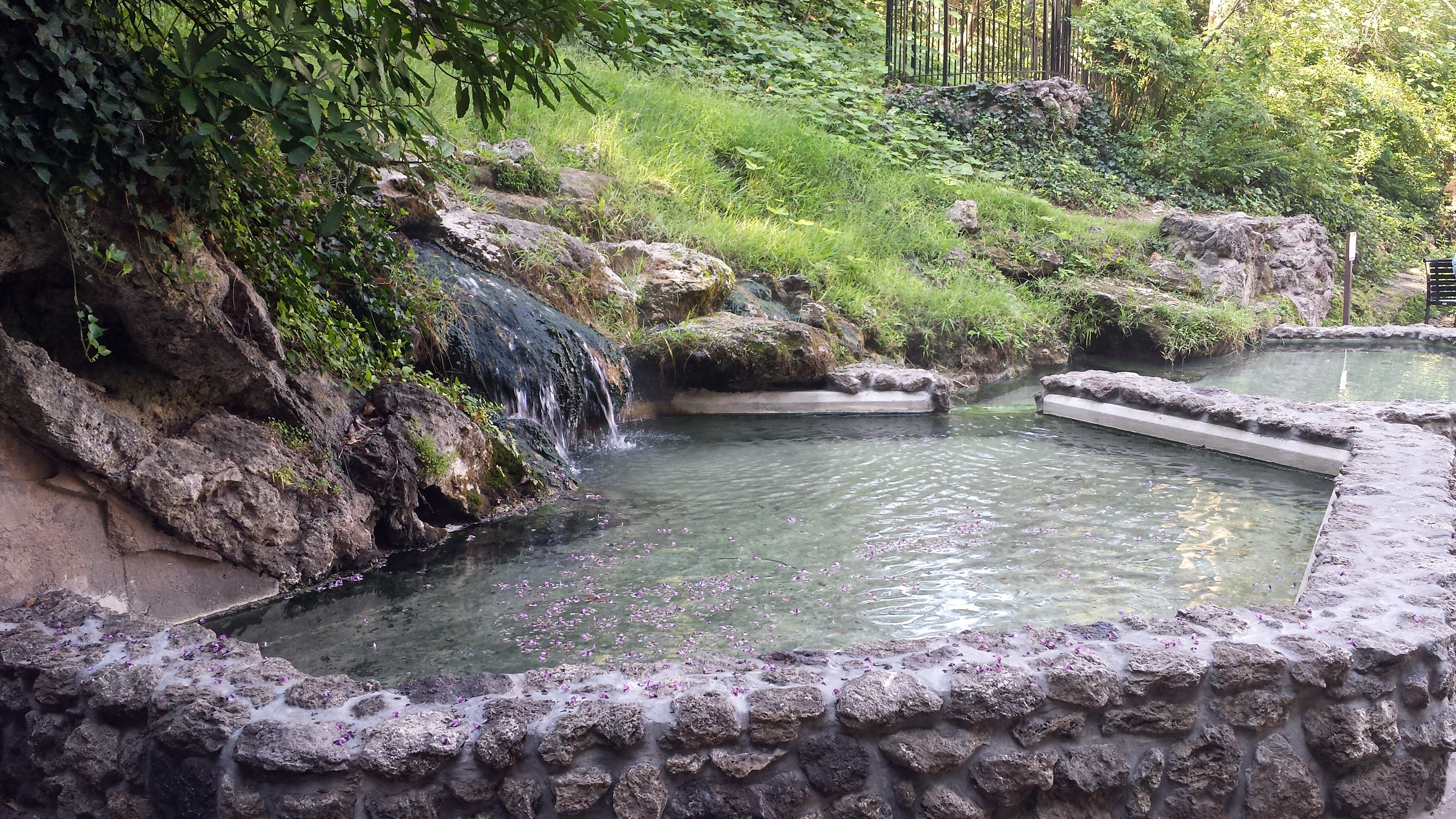
- Hot spring pool at the park

- Location within Arkansas Location within the United States
- Interactive map of Hot Springs National Park
- Location: Garland County, Arkansas, United States
- Nearest city: Hot Springs
- Coordinates: 34°30′49″N 93°3′13″W
- Area: 5,550 acres (22.5 km^{2})
- Established: April 20, 1832 (designated as a national park on March 4, 1921)
- Visitors: 2,646,133 (in 2022)
- Website: nps.gov/hosp

Hot Springs National Park is a national park of the United States in central Garland County, Arkansas, adjacent to the city of Hot Springs. Hot Springs Reservation was initially created by an act of the United States Congress on April 20, 1832, to be preserved for future recreation. Established before the concept of a national park existed, it was the first time that land had been set aside by the federal government to preserve its use as an area for recreation. Part of the natural area is old-growth forest and recognized by the Old-Growth Forest Network. The hot spring water has been popularly believed for centuries to possess medicinal properties, and was a subject of legend among several Native American tribes. Following federal protection in 1832, the city developed into a successful spa town.

Incorporated January 10, 1852, the city was known in the early 20th century as the home to Major League Baseball spring training, illegal gambling, speakeasies during the Prohibition era, and gangsters such as Al Capone, horse racing at Oaklawn Park, the Army and Navy Hospital, and 42nd President Bill Clinton. The area was established as a national park on March 4, 1921. Until the redesignation of Jefferson National Expansion Memorial as Gateway Arch National Park in 2018, Hot Springs was the smallest national park by area in the United States. Since Hot Springs National Park is the oldest park maintained by the National Park Service, it was the first to receive its own US quarter in April 2010 as part of the America the Beautiful Quarters coin series.

The hot springs flow from the western slope of Hot Springs Mountain, part of the Ouachita Mountain range. In the park, the hot springs have not been preserved in their unaltered state as natural surface phenomena. They have been managed to conserve the production of uncontaminated hot water for public use. The mountains within the park are also managed within this conservation philosophy to preserve the hydrological system that feeds the springs.

The park includes portions of downtown Hot Springs, making it one of the most accessible national parks. There are numerous hiking trails and camping areas. Bathing in spring water is available in approved facilities at extra cost. The entire Bathhouse Row area is designated as a National Historic Landmark District; it contains the grandest collection of bathhouses of its kind in North America, including many outstanding examples of Gilded Age architecture. The row's Fordyce Bathhouse serves as the park's visitor center; the Buckstaff and Quapaw are the only facilities in 2015 still operating as bathhouses. Other buildings of the row are being restored or are used for other purposes.

== Discovery and protection ==
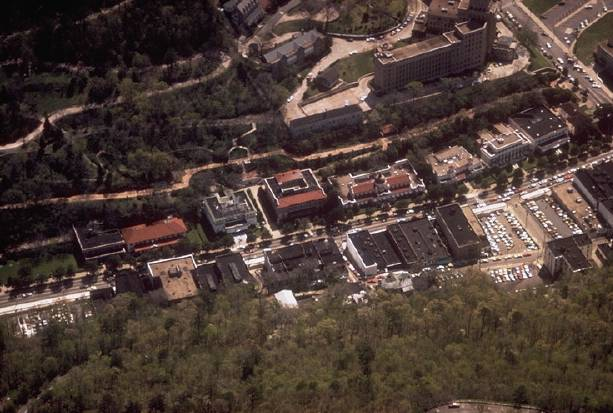
Aerial view of Hot Springs National Park showing the historic Bathhouse Row. Fourth from the left is the Fordyce Bathhouse which serves as the park visitor center.

For many years, this area was visited by chiefs and tribes of numerous indigenous peoples. They called it the "Valley of the Vapors" at the time of Spanish explorer Hernando de Soto's arrival in the area in 1541. He was the first known European to see the springs. Members of many Native American tribes had been gathering in the valley for over 8,000 years to enjoy the healing properties of the thermal springs. Around the 18th century the Caddo settled in the area, followed by the Choctaw, Cherokee, and other tribes from the Southeast across the Mississippi River. There was agreement among the tribes that they would put aside their weapons and partake of the healing waters in peace while in the valley. The Quapaw lived in the Arkansas River delta area and visited the springs.

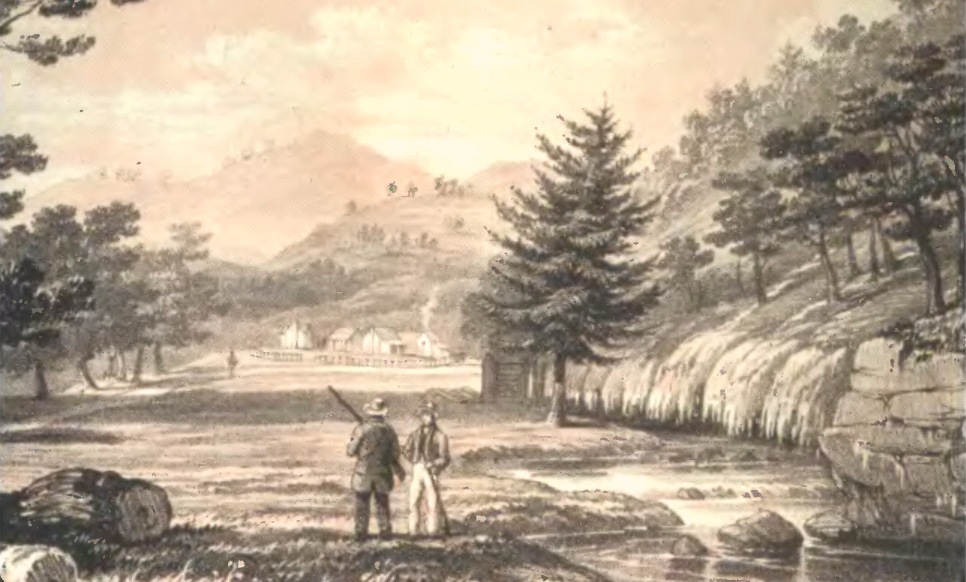
Hot Springs Creek in a lithograph published in 1844. Tufa formations line the right side of the creek.

In 1673 Father Marquette and Jolliet explored the area and claimed it for France. The Treaty of Paris 1763 ceded the land back to Spain; however, in 1800 control was returned to France until the Louisiana Purchase of 1803.

In December 1804 William Dunbar and George Hunter made an expedition to the Ouachita Mountains and the springs at the request of President Thomas Jefferson, to study the native peoples and flora and fauna. They found one log cabin and a few rudimentary shelters used by people visiting the springs for their healing properties. In 1807 Jean Emmanual Prudhomme, of French colonial descent, became the first European-American settler of modern Hot Springs. After he regained his health following two years of bathing in the hot water and eating local foods, he returned home to his plantation on the Red River in Louisiana. Not long afterward trappers John Perciful and Isaac Cates arrived; Perciful put up more cabins for visitors.

On August 24, 1818, the Quapaw Indians ceded the land around the hot springs to the United States in a treaty after having been forced to a reservation south of the site. They were removed to Indian Territory in the 1830s. After Arkansas became a territory in 1819, the Arkansas Territorial Legislature requested in 1820 that the springs and adjoining mountains be set aside as a federal reservation. Twelve years later, in 1832, the 22nd United States Congress formed the national reservation, granting federal protection of the thermal waters and giving Hot Springs the honor of being the first area to be designated for federal government protection. The Hot Springs Reservation was set aside for public use as a park on June 16, 1880.

== National park ==
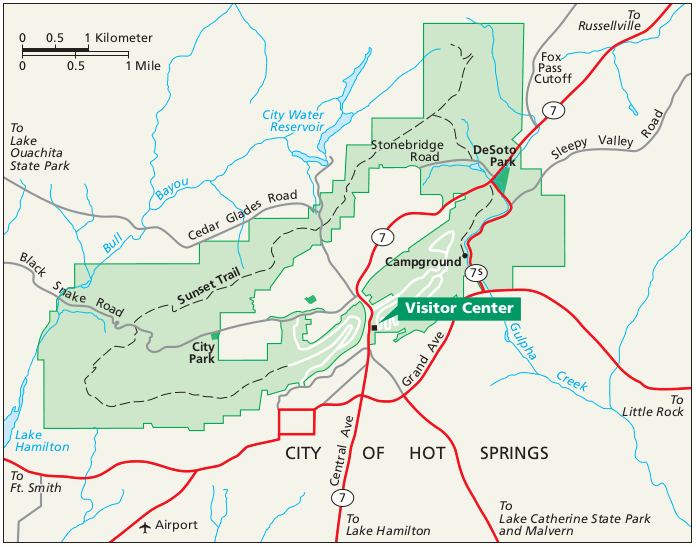
Hot Springs area park map

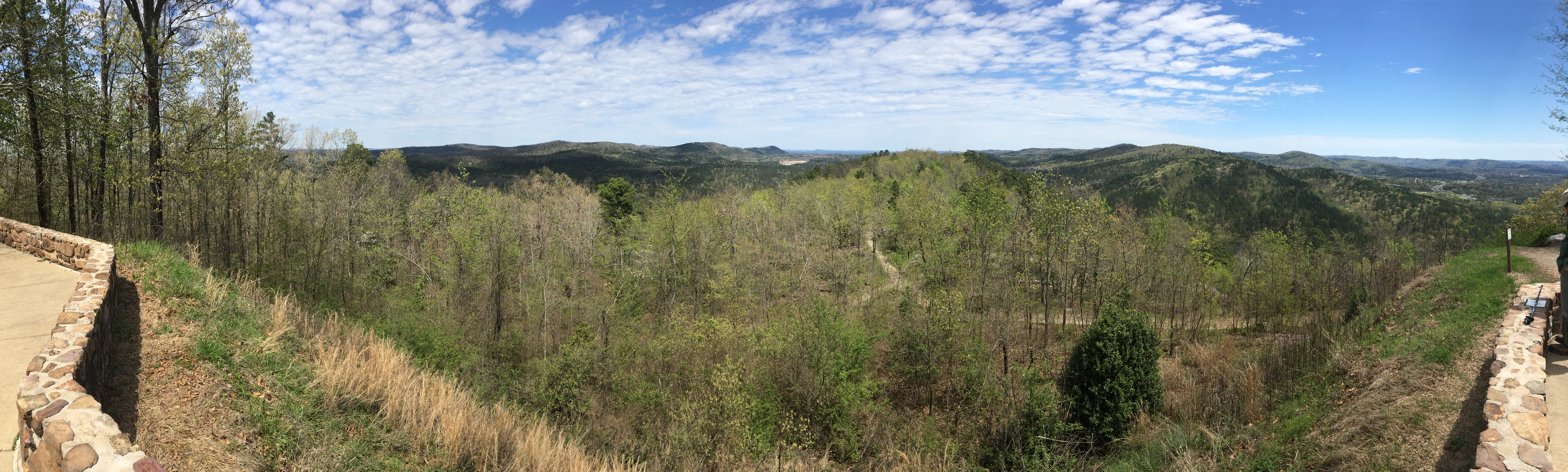
Hot Springs National Park woodlands from an overlook

By act of Congress in 1921, the site's name was officially changed from the Hot Springs Reservation to Hot Springs National Park. The government acquired more land, expanding it to more than 900 acres (3.6 km^{2}; 1.4 sq mi), including Hot Springs Mountain, North Mountain, West Mountain, Sugarloaf Mountain, and Whittington Lake Park. It later was expanded to 5,839 acres (23.63 km^{2}; 9.123 sq mi).

The springs are grouped about the base of the Hot Springs Mountain, with a flow of well over a half million gallons a day. The hot water is supplied to the various bathhouses, with resulting income from concession fees going to the U.S. Treasury. The park has miles of roads and trails over the mountains. The park is open throughout the year.

The first bathhouses were little more than brush huts and log cabins placed over excavations cut in the rocks to receive hot water that flowed from the springs. Entrepreneurs soon developed more elaborate bathing facilities, featuring wooden troughs delivering water from hillside springs to bathhouses along the east bank of Hot Springs Creek. Some of the tufa covering the hillside was excavated to accommodate the bathhouses. The narrow street along the west side of the creek was connected to the bathhouses by narrow bridges.

After direct federal supervision was exercised beginning in 1877, major improvements were made. The creek was covered with stone arches, and above it a street 100 ft (30 m) wide was built. All the squatters were evicted, rubbish cleaned up, and a centralized plumbing system was begun. This was completed around 1890. In 1950, central cooling towers limited the maximum temperature of the springs to a safe level, so individual bathhouses no longer needed their own cooling systems.

The park operates a public campground at Gulpha Gorge, about 2 mi (3.2 km) from downtown Hot Springs.

== Location ==
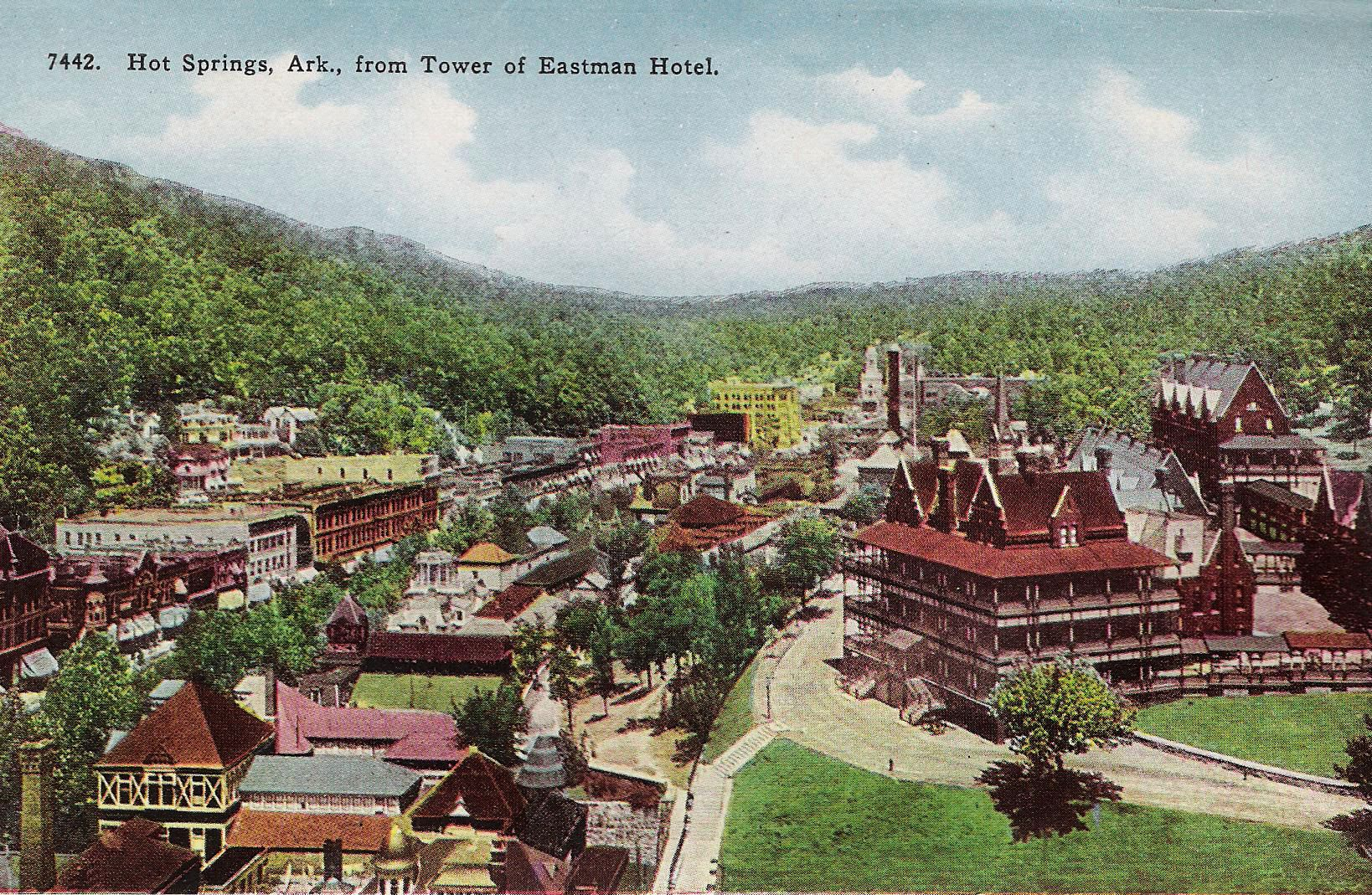
Central Avenue, on left, circa 1900, taken from the tower of the Eastman Hotel. Many commercial buildings are on the west side, across from Bathhouse Row.

The city of Hot Springs (incorporated 1851) is governed under State and municipal law. In the 1870s, African Americans in town were concentrated in Happy Valley, north of Hot Springs Mountain. There were churches of various denominations, including Baptist for white and black congregations.

The National Park Service exercises no control or supervision over any matters connected with the city. The city starts on the other side of Central Avenue from Bathhouse Row. Its development has extended beyond the narrow valley in which the springs are located, spreading out over the open plain to the south and east. The climate is good throughout the year. The elevation of the city is 600 feet (180 m) above sea level, with surrounding hills rising another 600 feet. In the first half of the 20th century, the city operated primarily as a summer resort, but hotels have now long stayed open during the winter due to many northerly patrons coming to escape the winter cold.

During the peak popularity of the hot springs, until the 1950s, the many patients staying for three weeks, six weeks, or longer were a large source of business for the numerous hotels, boarding houses, doctors, and drugstores. As the daily treatments required only an hour or two, the visitors' idle time created opportunities for other businesses in the town.

== Bathing customs ==
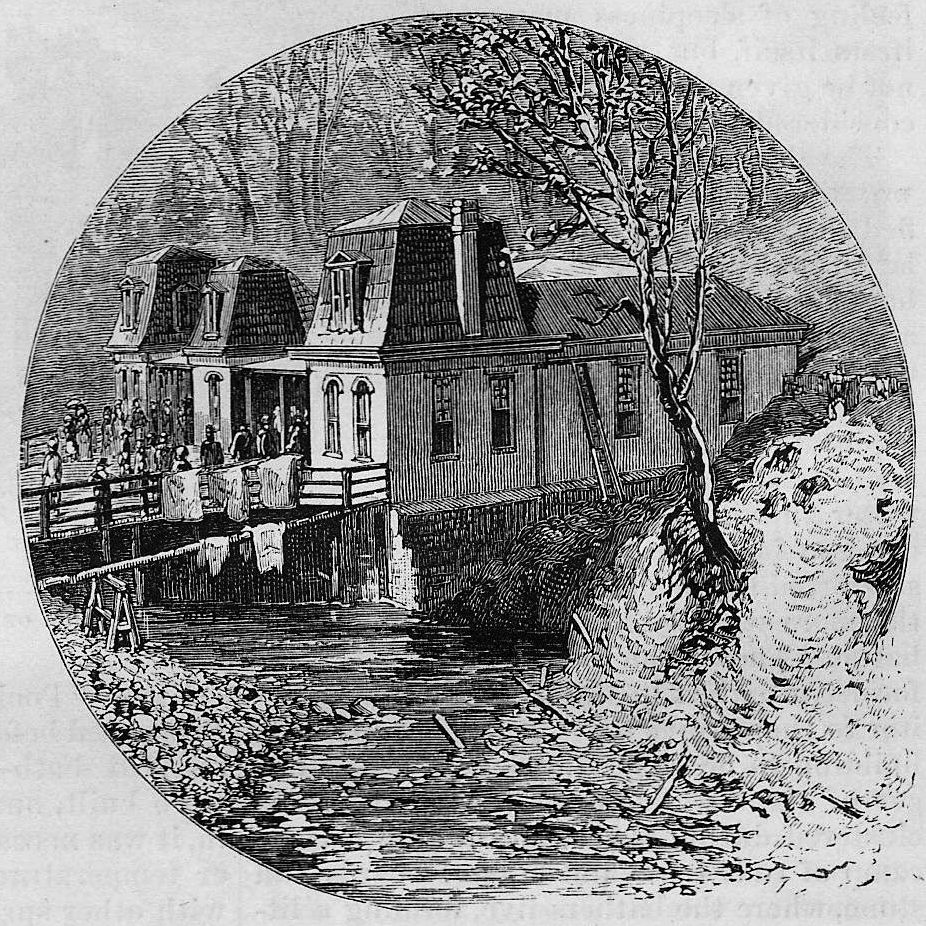
Big Iron bathhouse (Harper's 1878)

It was believed the waters benefited diseases of the skin and blood, nervous affections, rheumatism and kindred diseases, and the "various diseases of women". In the case of tuberculosis and lung diseases, and acute and inflammatory diseases, the use of the waters was considered injurious and in many cases very dangerous.

The earliest bathing procedure consisted of merely reclining in natural pools of hot springs and cool creek water for long periods of time. During the 1820s crude vapor baths stood over the springs, and bathers breathed in the vapors for extended periods of time. Wooden tubs were added to some bathhouses in the 1830s. Physicians began arriving in the 1850s, although many visitors did without their services; visitors remained from one week to two months. After the Civil War a tub bath of 15 to 20 minutes was common.

During the 1870s the bathing regimen became more diverse, and physicians prescribed various types of baths for patients. The period of time for tub baths became six to ten minutes and the time in the steam bath shortened to two minutes, with only one bath a day.

The treatment was by drinking and bathing in the waters, producing a profuse perspiration, which was considered an active agent in fighting disease. The advice of a physician who was familiar with the use of the waters was considered necessary to avoid injury. In many cases medicine was required before using the waters, although it had been observed that the amount of drugs given was "enough to sicken a well man."

The hot baths were usually taken once a day for three weeks, when a rest was necessary (often with a week at the sulphur springs near the Ouachita River). A second three weeks' course was then taken, followed again by an abstinence from bathing for several days. The usual stay at the springs was from one to three months, but many invalids stayed a year and longer.

The process described in 1878 was a hot bath of 90 to 95 °F (32 to 35 °C) for about 3 minutes (timed with a sand-glass). This was followed by another three minutes with all but the head in a steam box, or if milder treatment was prescribed, sitting atop the steam box covered with a blanket. During this the bather is also drinking hot water from their coffee-pot. After these eight to ten minutes of treatment, the bather is well rubbed down and thoroughly dried. The blanket-covered customer then would walk briskly back to their quarters to lie down for at least a half-hour to let the body recover its normal temperature. Sleeping at this stage was considered dangerous.

The bathhouses began using vapor cabinets around 1884. The bather sat in the cabinet for 10–20 minutes with the lid closed tightly around the neck, with vapor from the hot water rising through the floor of the cabinet, with temperatures around 110–130 °F (43–54 °C). Toward the end of the 1880s Russian and Victorian Turkish baths were offered, and in the 1890s German needle baths and Scotch douches (concentrated stream of hot or cold water, often used on the back) were added.

Although details of services were left to bathhouse operators, the Park's superintendent set various rules. In the 1930s a tub bath could not take more than 20 minutes and shower no more than 90 seconds. During the next decade shower time was reduced to a minute, with maximum temperatures specified for several services. After a bath of about 98 °F (37 °C), the patient might spend 2–5 minutes in a vapor cabinet, get 15 minutes of packs (wet, hot or cold), followed by a tepid needle shower, and light massage and alcohol rub.

By 1980 one reporter described getting a 20-minute bath, two minutes in a steam bath, 15 minutes wrapped with hot packs, and resting in a cooling room for 20–30 minutes. The current modern facilities are oriented toward spa style or pool services.

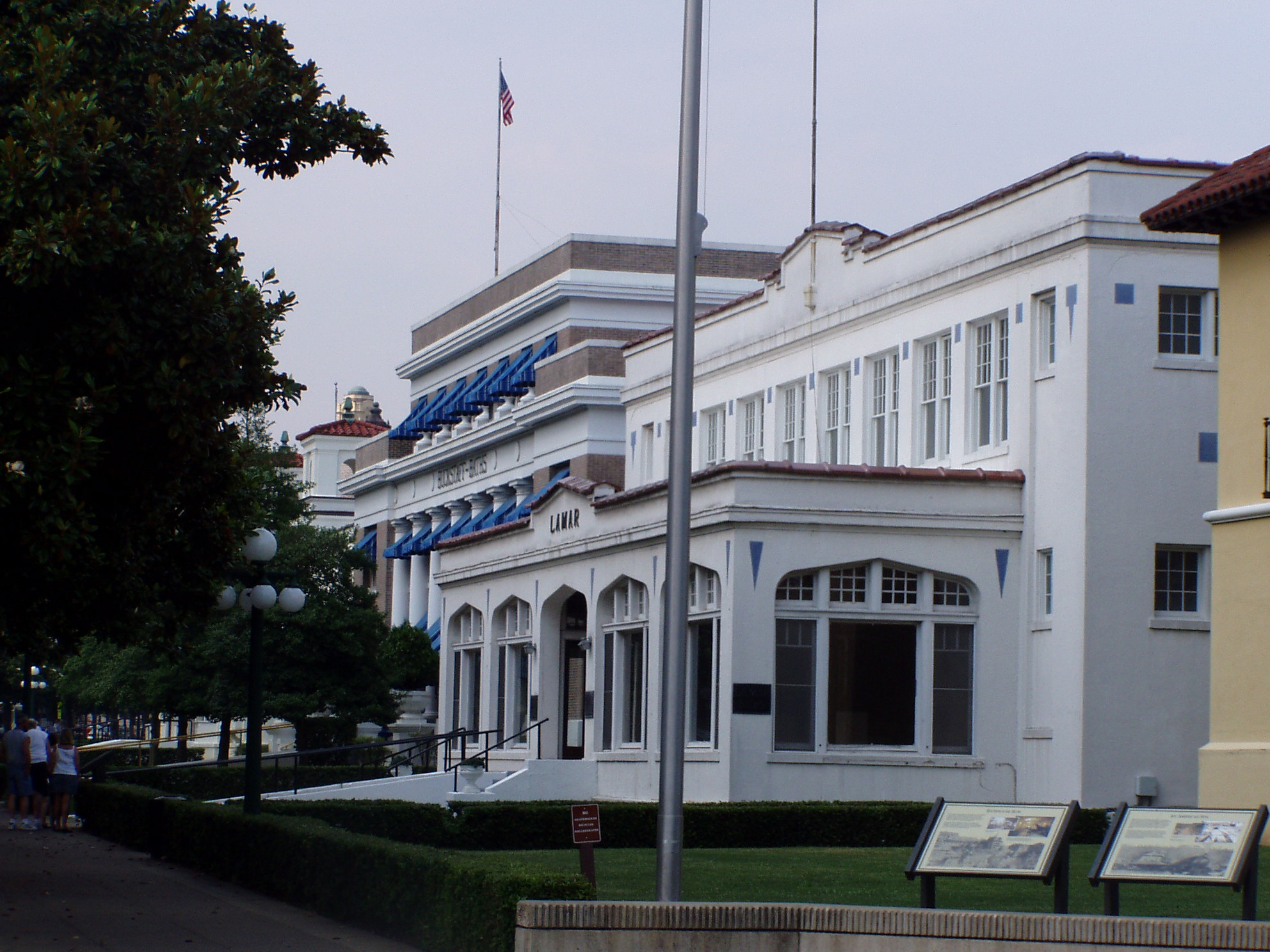
Lamar Bathhouse

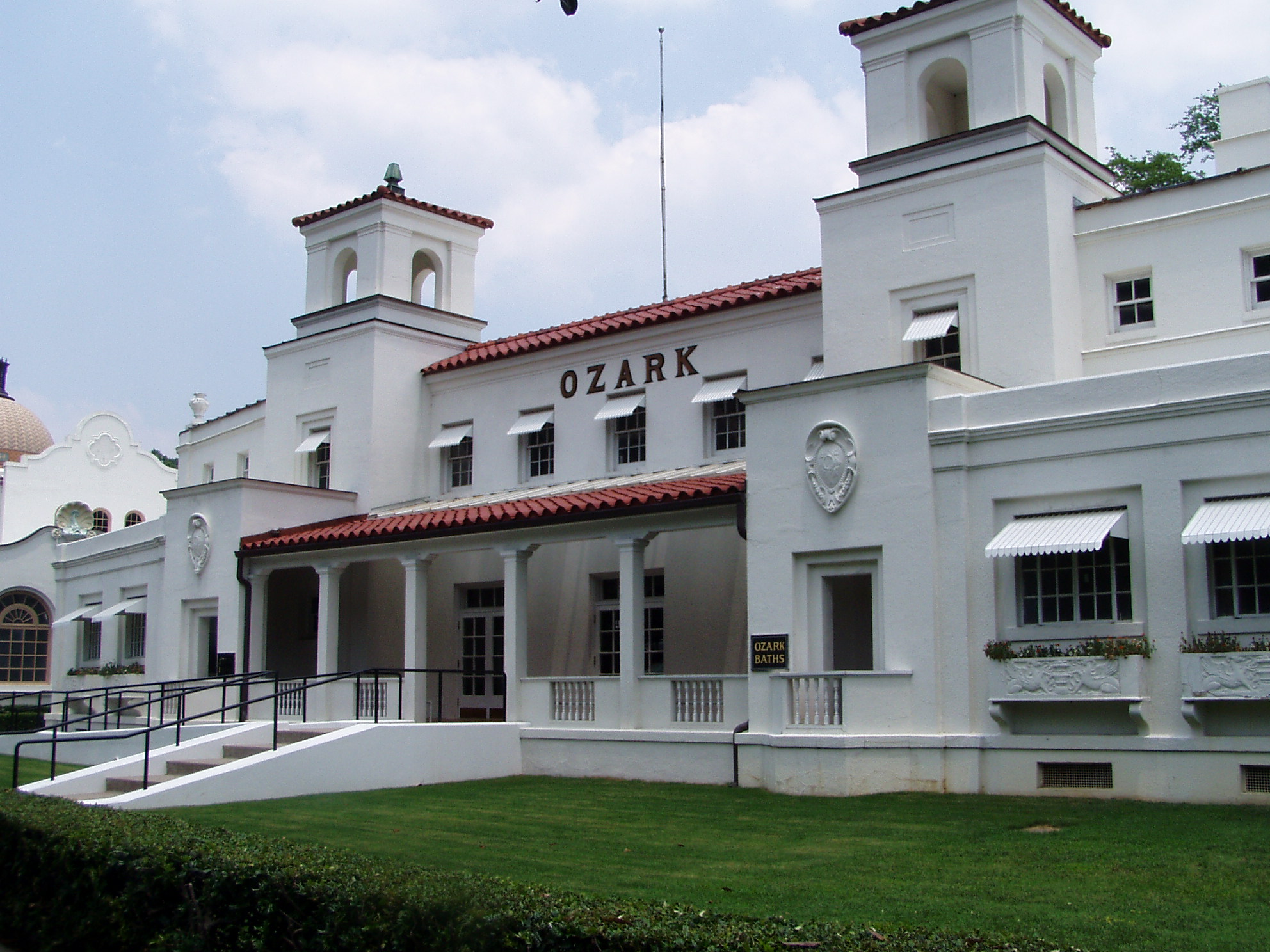
Ozark Bathhouse

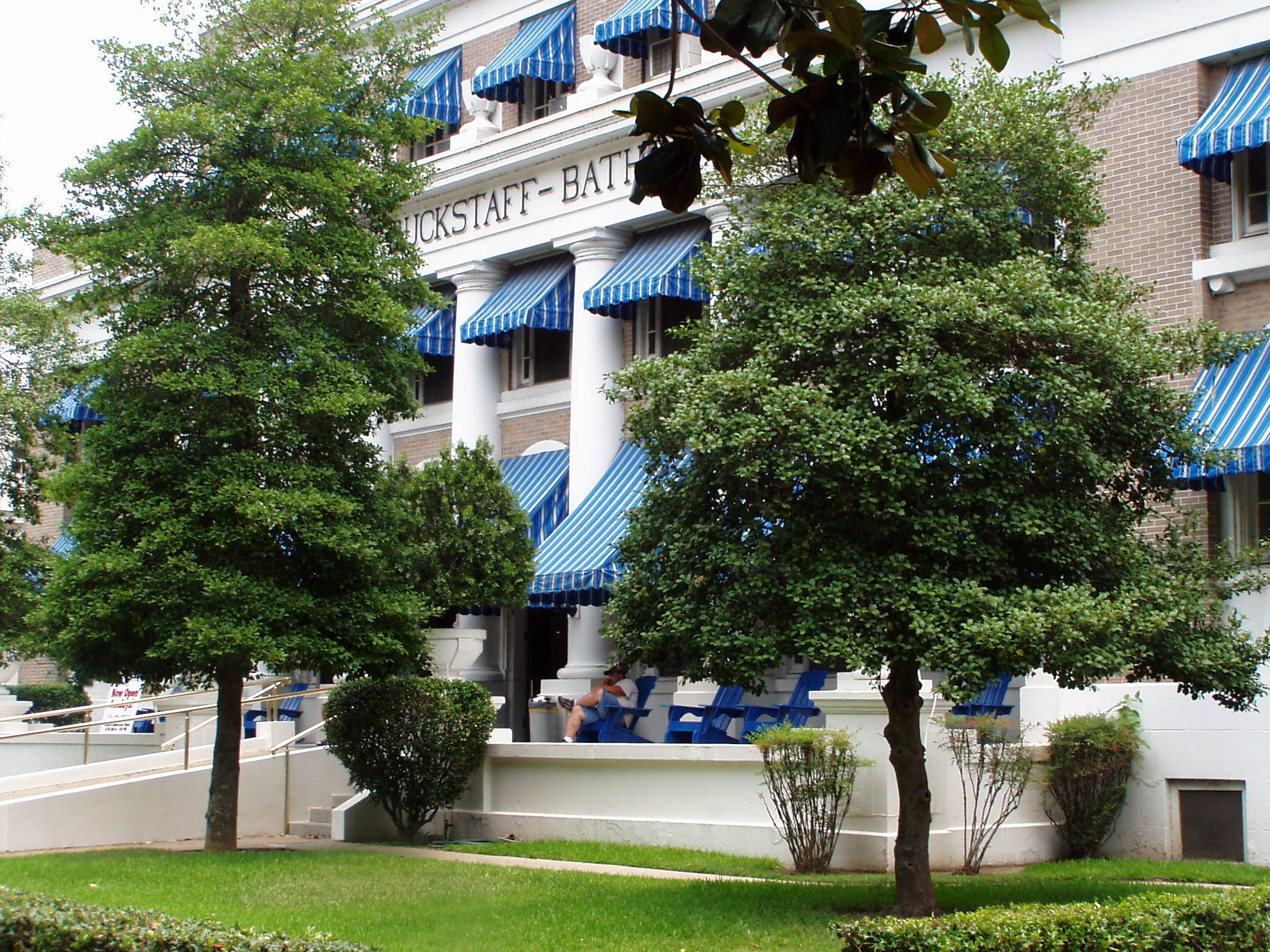
Buckstaff Bathhouse

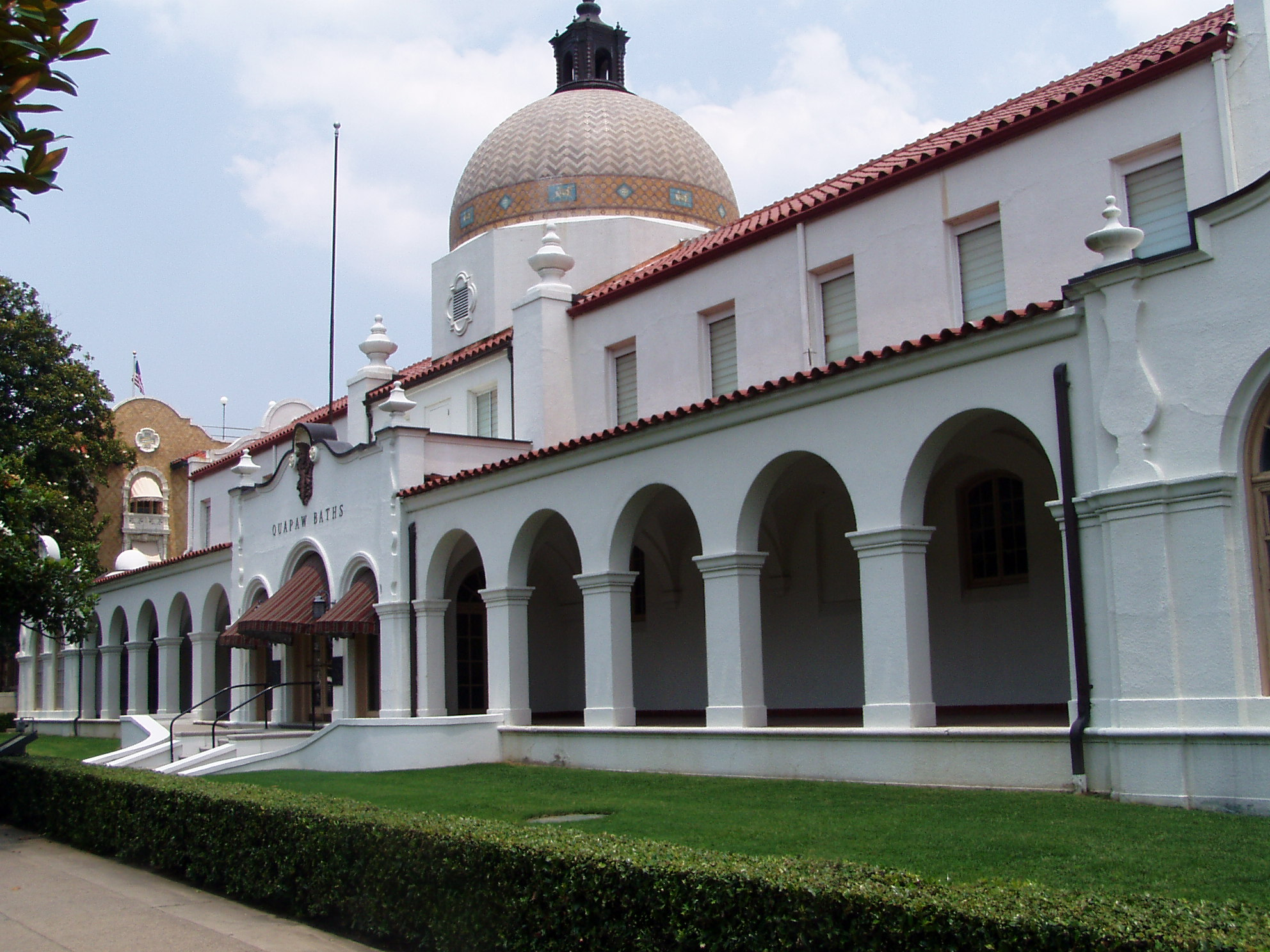
Quapaw Bathhouse

== Pay bathhouses ==
There have been nearly two dozen pay bathhouses operating at the same time, with about nine of those within the park's "Bathhouse Row." (Facilities have been reworked over the years, and the Quapaw operate a bath incorporating two previously separate bathhouses). Nine of the bathhouses were associated with hotels, hospitals, or sanatoria. The water is the same for all, but the prices charged for the baths have varied according to the equipment, accommodations and services offered by each facility. The charges for the services of the attendants are the same and include the necessities except towels, blankets, bathrobes, laundering, rubbing mercury, and handling of invalids.

The area was popular with baseball players in the early 20th century, and was used by some teams for spring training. In 1929, prices for single baths ranged from $1 to $1.40, while a course of 21 baths was $16 to $24. Facilities were segregated until civil rights legislation in the 1960s. Baths were offered for whites at the Arlington Hotel, Fordyce, Buckstaff, the 500-room Eastman Hotel, Maurice, La Mar, Majestic Hotel, Quapaw, Hale, Imperial, Moody Hotel, Ozark, St. Joseph's Infirmary, Superior, Ozark Sanatorium, Rockafellow, and Alhambra, and for people of color at the Pythian, Woodmen of Union and National Baptist Hotel and Sanitorium.

At present on Bathhouse Row only the Buckstaff and Quapaw are operating as bathhouses. The Fordyce is open as a visitor center; its staff gives tours of the facilities that have been historically renovated to their original appearance. The Ozark is housing the Museum of Contemporary Art; its space can be rented as reception hall. The Arlington Hotel, Austin Hotel and Convention Center, and The Springs Hotel & Spa also offer hot spring baths using the Park water.

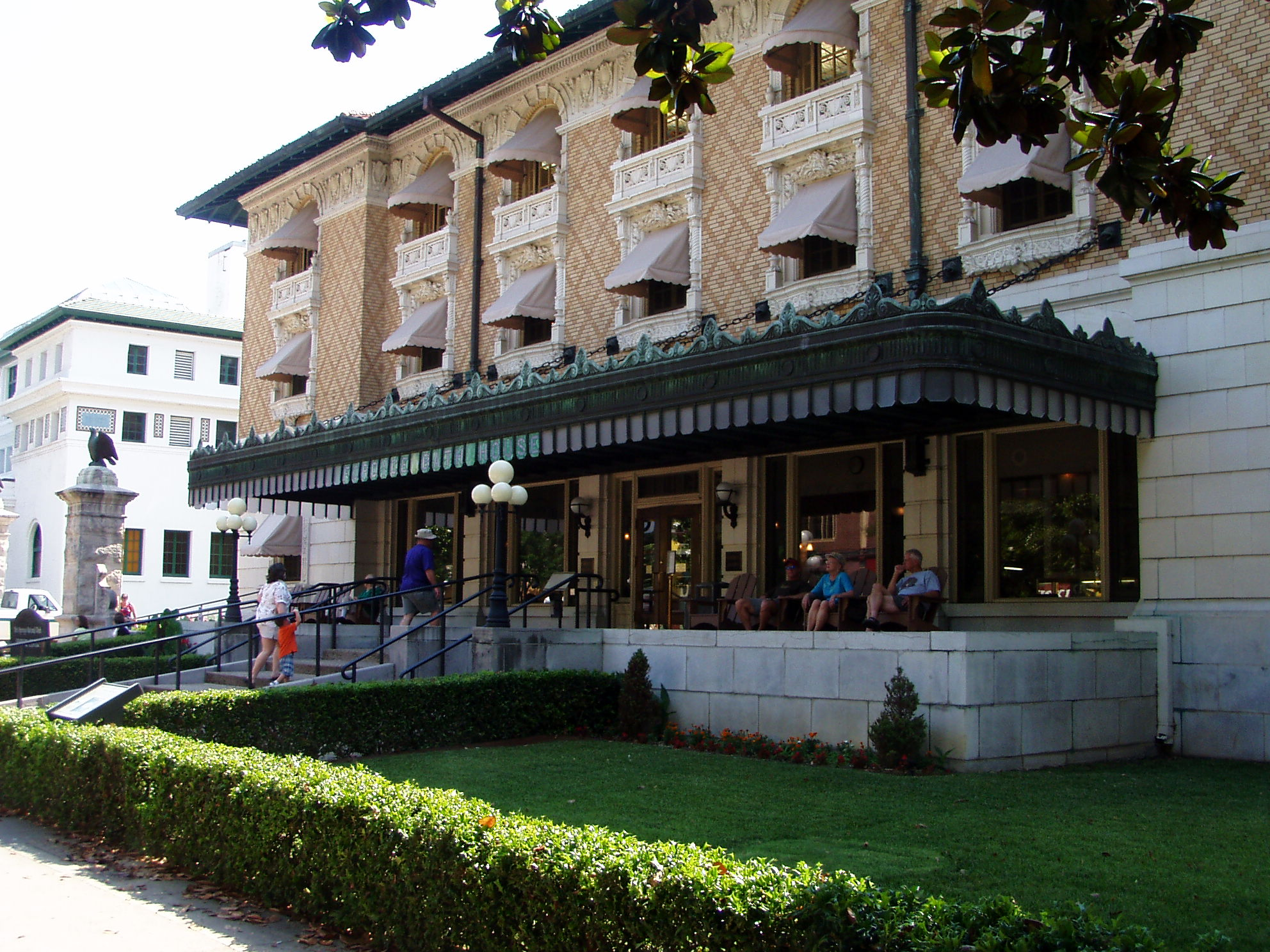
Fordyce Bathhouse

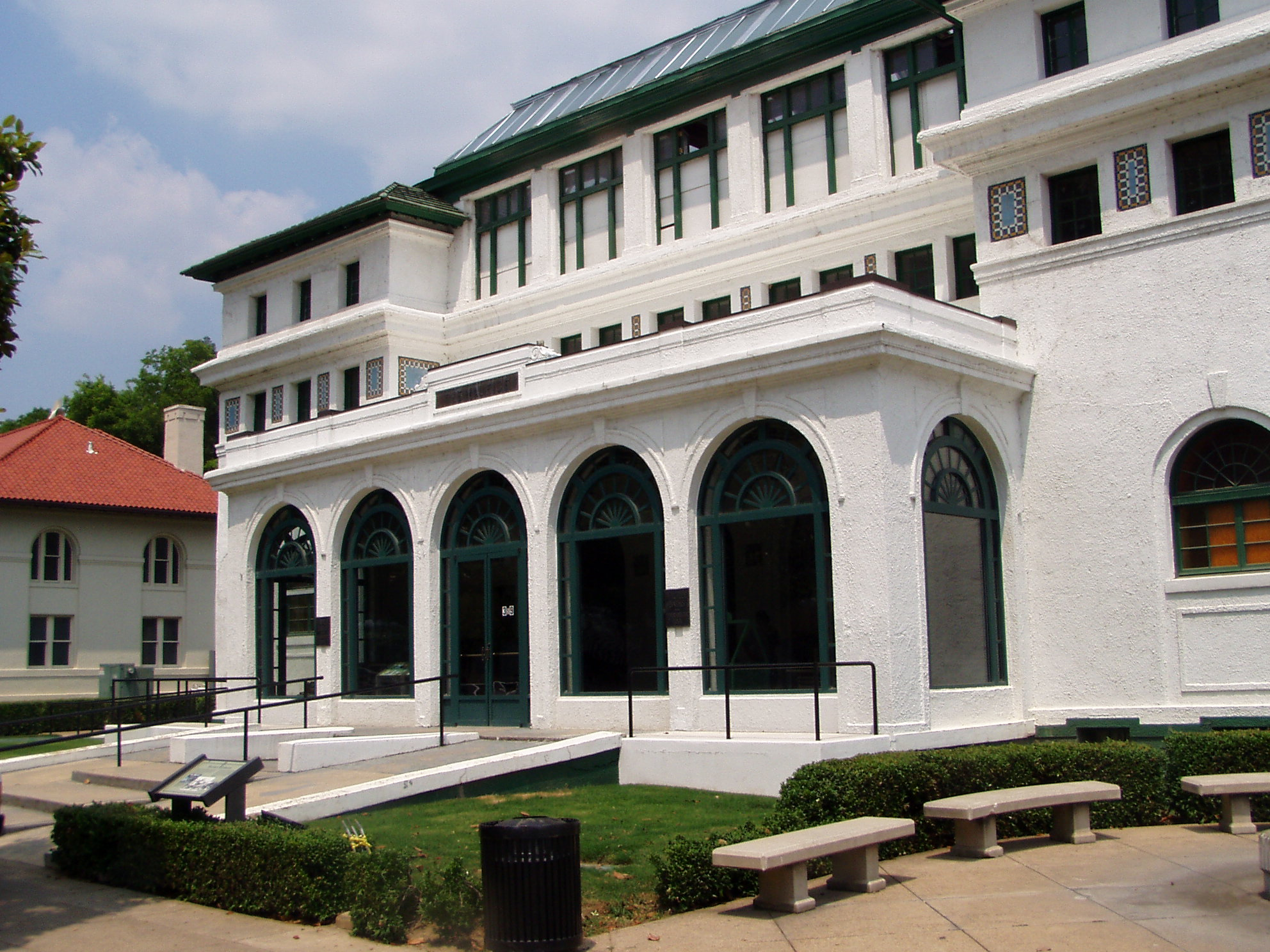
Maurice Bathhouse

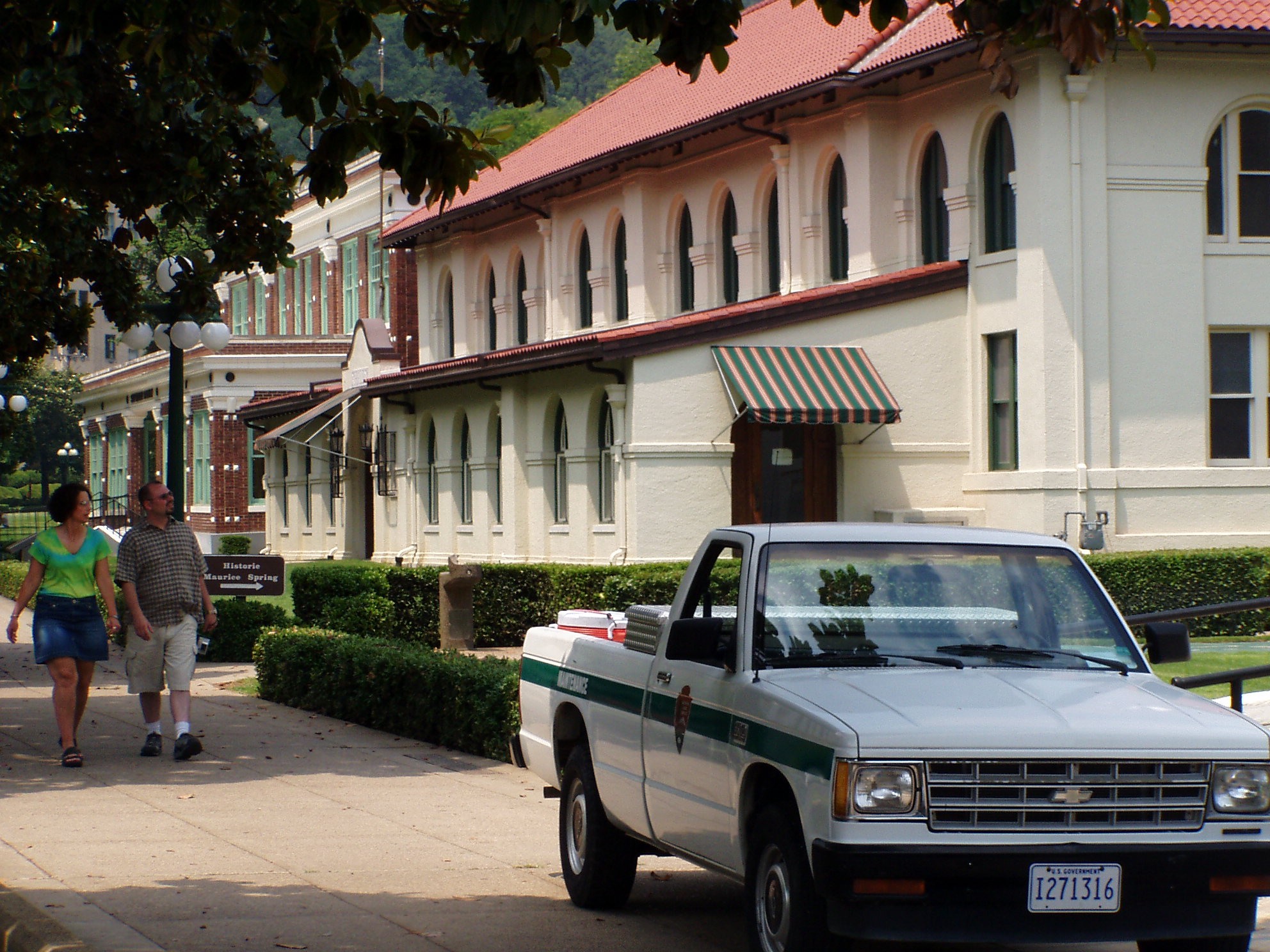
Hale and Superior Bathhouses

National Baptist Hotel and Sanitorium (bathhouse for 'colored peoples')

== Army and Navy Hospital ==
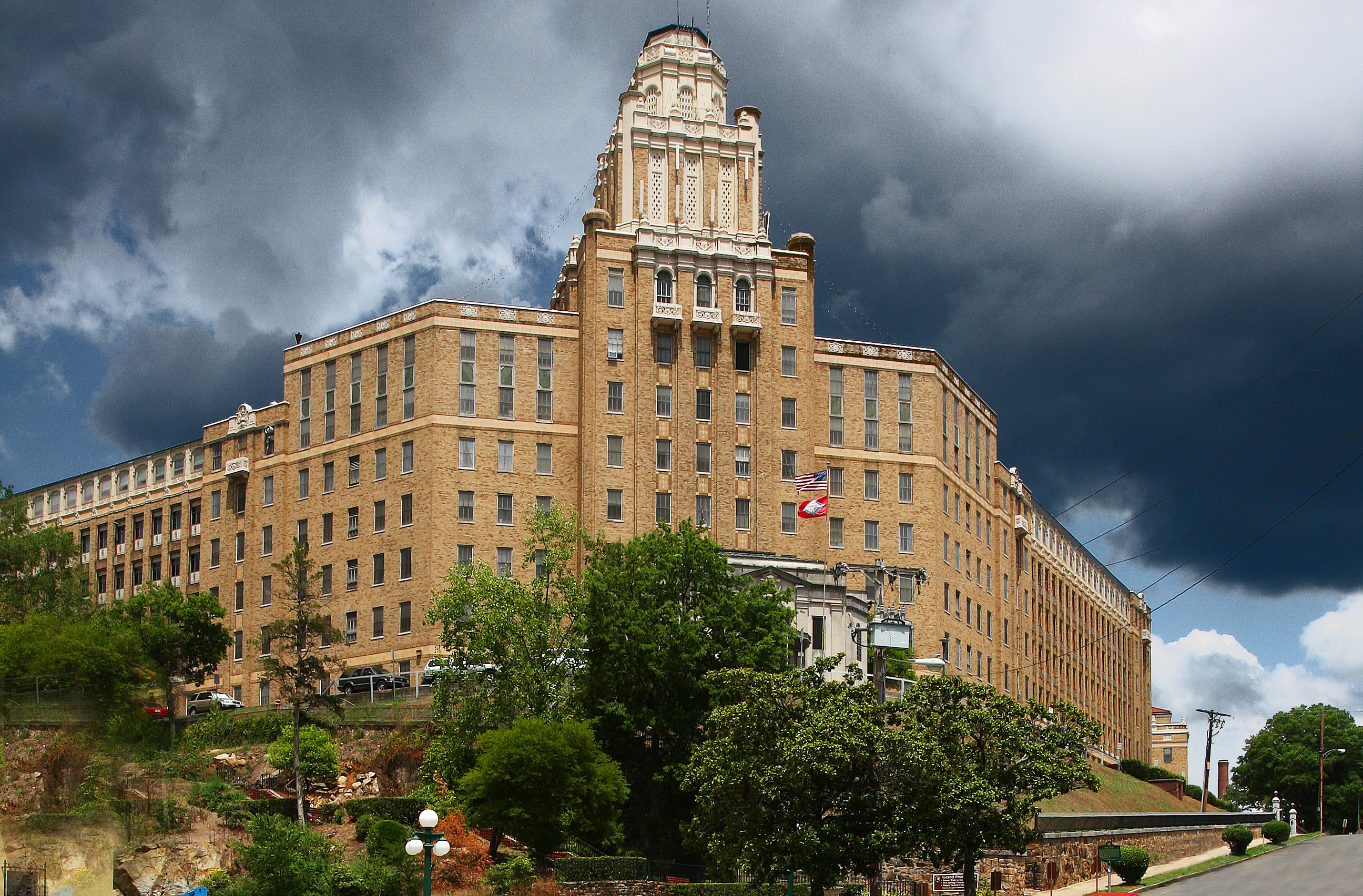
The former Army and Navy Hospital (later the Arkansas Career Development Center)

The former Army and Navy General Hospital was also supplied with water from the springs. It is located behind the south end of Bathhouse Row along the base of Hot Springs Mountain. It was administered by the War Department for the benefit of military members, officers of the Public Health Service, and honorably discharged veterans. The waters of the hot springs had an established reputation in benefiting those suffering from illnesses. Admission to the hospital was reserved for cases "of a serious and obstinate character, which, though resisting ordinary methods of relief, were promised a rapid and permanent recovery from the use of the waters of the spring."

=== Subsequent usage and abandonment ===
The present facility was built in 1933 as the second Army-Navy hospital. It has been used and operated by the state for over 60 years, first as the Hot Springs Rehabilitation Center, then for a short time as the Arkansas Career Training Institute, and the Arkansas Career Development Center until May 2019.

After declining enrollment at the Arkansas Career Development Center, the building was vacated in 2019. It is unclear as to who currently is the owner of the property.

As the building was built by the U.S. Federal Government originally to be used by the city of Hot Springs as a hospital, there is a case that the Army and Navy Hospital building would have to be used for that purpose for new occupants. Those seeking to preserve the building estimate it could cost $1 million per year to maintain and speculate that both the state and federal government are letting the property remain in limbo due to the cost of operating it.

It is listed on the National Register of Historic Places as the "Army and Navy General Hospital Historic District".

== Disasters ==
In November 1864 during the American Civil War, a large part of "the valley" (the central portion of the city along Hot Springs Creek) was burned - presumably by Union troops.

As in many other cities, fire has been a risk, especially before city services were developed. On March 5, 1878, a large fire burned for eight hours in the city, claiming nearly 150 buildings, including hotels, bath houses, and restaurants. On February 26, 1905, a fire started in the Grand Central Hotel on Chapel Street and burned 25 blocks of the southern section of Hot Springs. On September 5, 1913, a laundry worker was ironing and accidentally started a fire at 424 Church Street, which spread rapidly due to strong winds and burned 50 blocks in the business district of the city.

The city has also been subject to flooding because of the narrow valley. On May 14, 1923, a severe rainstorm hit the city. With mountains surrounding three sides of the city, water flooded down the slopes of the mountains, funnelling to Central Avenue and reaching a depth of nine feet. A lightning strike during the storm caused a fire that destroyed several commercial businesses in downtown Hot Springs. On February 15, 1956, a severe flood filled Central Avenue with three feet of rushing water, causing significant property damage. On May 19, 1990, a series of storms dropped more than 13 inches (330 mm) of rain into the city, causing flash floods. A wave of water six feet high washed through downtown Hot Springs, causing extensive damage. During the flood, Carpenter Dam Bridge was washed away.

=== The Majestic Hotel ===
On February 27, 2014, fire broke out at the Majestic Hotel on Park Avenue just outside the boundaries of the national park. It took 75 firefighters over 22 hours to extinguish the blaze in the yellow brick portion (oldest section of the hotel).

The surviving portion of the Majestic was condemned and remaining property was auctioned off in October 2014. As a result of the fire, Abandoned Atlas Foundation president Michael Schwarz began production on a documentary regarding the Majestic titled Forever Majestic. The documentary takes place just after the 2014 fire and follows two activists as they try to save the hotel from condemnation.

Despite the efforts of activists, after remaining vacant for over two years, the Hot Springs Board of Directors voted to demolish the building. The remainder of the Majestic was razed in the Fall of 2016.

The site of the former Majestic Hotel was sold to a property developer, but as of 2022 the company backed out of the project.

== Government Free Baths ==
Congress established a free bathhouse for the indigent here on December 16, 1878. The Ral Hole mudpit and pool were closed, and the first Government Free Bathhouse operated at the site. The Government Free Bathhouse was a concrete building fully equipped for bathing large numbers of people under sanitary conditions. In 1878 the Army and Navy opened a free dispensary on the second floor, which remained open for two years. In 1916 the Public Health Service opened a clinic for the examination and treatment of indigents taking the free baths. 100,000 baths a year were given to the poor. Applicants for free baths were required to make an oath that they were without and unable to obtain means to pay for the baths, with violations being a misdemeanor subject to fine and/or imprisonment. Tickets were issued to those who, after examination, were found to be suffering from diseases which were reasonably expected to be benefited from the baths.

During the 1880s a few of the open springs gradually dried up. Corn Hole, a popular spring where people soaked their feet, dried up in 1882. Other open springs were either covered over by the National Park Service or the bathhouse owners to prevent their pollution.

A new free bathhouse was built in 1904, with separate facilities for black and white patrons. The materials used in construction were of poor quality. A new bathhouse was built off the reservation in 1922. The Park Service reminded people that they had to provide their own board and lodging and to have return travel fare, due to many destitute invalids who arrived each year in the mistaken belief that there was a public institution at which they would be cared for free of charge. The free bathhouse closed in 1957, as it was more economical to have the few indigent customers served by the commercial bathhouses. The poor applied at park headquarters and upon approval by a physician were sent to a participating bathhouse, which was reimbursed by the government.

== Climate ==
According to the Köppen climate classification system, Hot Springs National Park has a Humid subtropical climate (Cfa). According to the United States Department of Agriculture, the Plant Hardiness zone at Hot Springs National Park Visitor Center at 627 ft (191 m) elevation is 7b with an average annual extreme minimum temperature of 9.5 °F (-12.5 °C).

Climate data for Hot Springs National Park Visitor Center. Elev: 712 ft (217 m)
Month	Jan	Feb	Mar	Apr	May	Jun	Jul	Aug	Sep	Oct	Nov	Dec	Year
Mean daily maximum °F (°C)	51.4 (10.8)	56.2 (13.4)	64.7 (18.2)	73.6 (23.1)	80.5 (26.9)	88.2 (31.2)	92.9 (33.8)	93.3 (34.1)	85.7 (29.8)	74.8 (23.8)	62.9 (17.2)	52.5 (11.4)	73.1 (22.8)
Daily mean °F (°C)	40.7 (4.8)	44.6 (7.0)	52.6 (11.4)	61.3 (16.3)	69.5 (20.8)	77.1 (25.1)	81.3 (27.4)	80.9 (27.2)	73.3 (22.9)	62.4 (16.9)	51.7 (10.9)	42.1 (5.6)	61.5 (16.4)
Mean daily minimum °F (°C)	29.9 (−1.2)	33.0 (0.6)	40.5 (4.7)	48.9 (9.4)	58.4 (14.7)	66.0 (18.9)	69.7 (20.9)	68.5 (20.3)	60.9 (16.1)	50.0 (10.0)	40.6 (4.8)	31.7 (−0.2)	49.9 (9.9)
Average precipitation inches (mm)	3.56 (90)	4.13 (105)	5.18 (132)	5.01 (127)	5.86 (149)	4.40 (112)	4.40 (112)	2.81 (71)	3.78 (96)	5.31 (135)	5.45 (138)	5.14 (131)	55.03 (1,398)
Average relative humidity (%)	68.1	65.4	62.6	63.2	70.8	71.6	68.9	67.0	68.5	69.0	71.8	71.9	68.2
Average dew point °F (°C)	31.0 (−0.6)	33.7 (0.9)	40.2 (4.6)	48.7 (9.3)	59.6 (15.3)	67.2 (19.6)	70.1 (21.2)	68.9 (20.5)	62.3 (16.8)	52.1 (11.2)	42.9 (6.1)	33.7 (0.9)	50.9 (10.5)
Source: PRISM Climate Group

== Flora and fauna ==
According to the A. W. Kuchler U.S. Potential natural vegetation Types, Hot Springs has an Oak/Hickory/Pine (111) potential vegetation type and a Southern Mixed forest (26) potential vegetation form.

The area is primarily forest. The northern slopes of the ridges and basins provide a suitable habitat for deciduous forest dominated by oak and hickory. Pines predominate on the south sides of the ridges. There are 230 acres (93 ha) of unlogged pine and oak forests on North and Hot Springs Mountains, and 90 acres (36 ha) on Sugarloaf Mountain. These old-growth forests contain shortleaf pine, blackjack oak, and white oak; many of the trees over 130 years old, and a few over 200 years old.

Plains bison, Eastern elk, North American cougar and Gregory's wolf left the region after European settlement. Present day fauna include white-tailed deer, wild turkey, squirrel, rabbit, Virginia opossum, gray fox, coyote, skunk, raccoon, gopher, long-tailed weasel, mink, rat, chipmunk, frog, and nine-banded armadillo. Some migratory birds following the Mississippi Flyway spend part of the year in the vicinity.

== Geology ==
The thermal springs are situated in the Ouachita Mountains of central Arkansas. The springs emerge in a gap between Hot Springs Mountain and West Mountain in an area about 1,500 ft (460 m) long by 400 ft (120 m) wide at altitudes from 576 to 683 ft (176 to 208 m). The springs predominantly are composed of hot water from thousands of feet underground mixed with some shallow cold ground water. Currently, there are 43 thermal springs in the park that are presumed to be flowing. Thermal water from 33 of the thermal springs is collected and monitored at a central reservoir, which distributes the combined discharge for public use and consumption. Rock types in the area include shale units which generally impede ground-water movement, while fractured chert, novaculite, and sandstone units generally support ground-water movement.

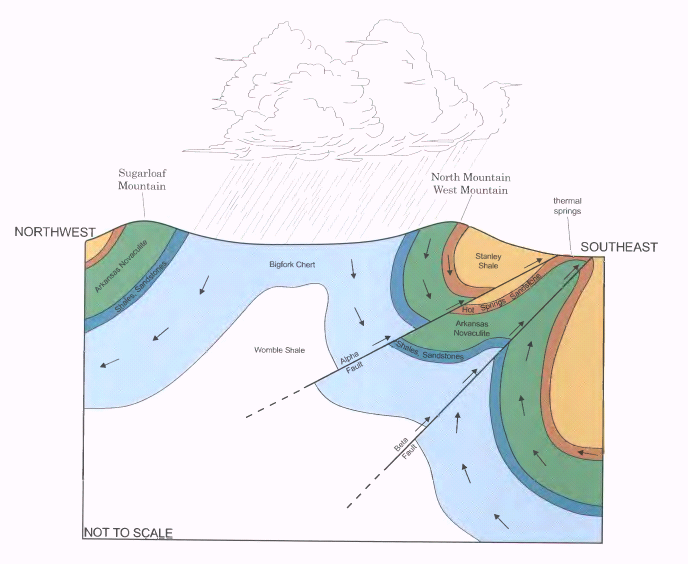
Conceptual diagram of thermal water flow

The water comes from rain which falls in mountains to the north and northeast. Flowing downward through cracked rock at about one foot per year, the meteoric water migrates to estimated minimum depths of 4,500 to 7,500 ft (1,400 to 2,300 m) and achieves high temperatures in the deep section of the flow path before rising along fault and fracture conduits. Under artesian pressure, the thermal waters rise and emerge through the Hot Springs Sandstone between the traces of two thrust faults, along several northeast-trending lineaments. Some rainwater from near the springs mixes with the deep hot water before discharge. The trip down takes about 4,000 years while the hot water takes about a year to reach the surface.

The heat comes from the natural heating of rocks as depth increases. The composition of the water indicates it is heated rainwater which has not approached a magmatic source, so no volcanic action is involved in the formation of these hot springs. The result is the mildly alkaline, pleasant tasting solution with dissolved calcium carbonate.

=== Rock types ===
The exposed rock types in the vicinity of the thermal springs are sedimentary rocks of Mississippian to Ordovician age, with the exception of younger igneous rocks (Cretaceous age) exposed in two small areas about 6 and 11 miles (9.7 and 17.7 km) southeast of the thermal springs (Potash Sulphur Spring and Magnet Cove, respectively), and in many small dikes and sills. Most dikes are less than 5 ft (1.5 m) wide. There have been 80 dikes noted about 4 miles (6.4 km) southeast of Hot Springs, on and near the Ouachita River. There is no indication that igneous rock occurs where the thermal springs discharge.

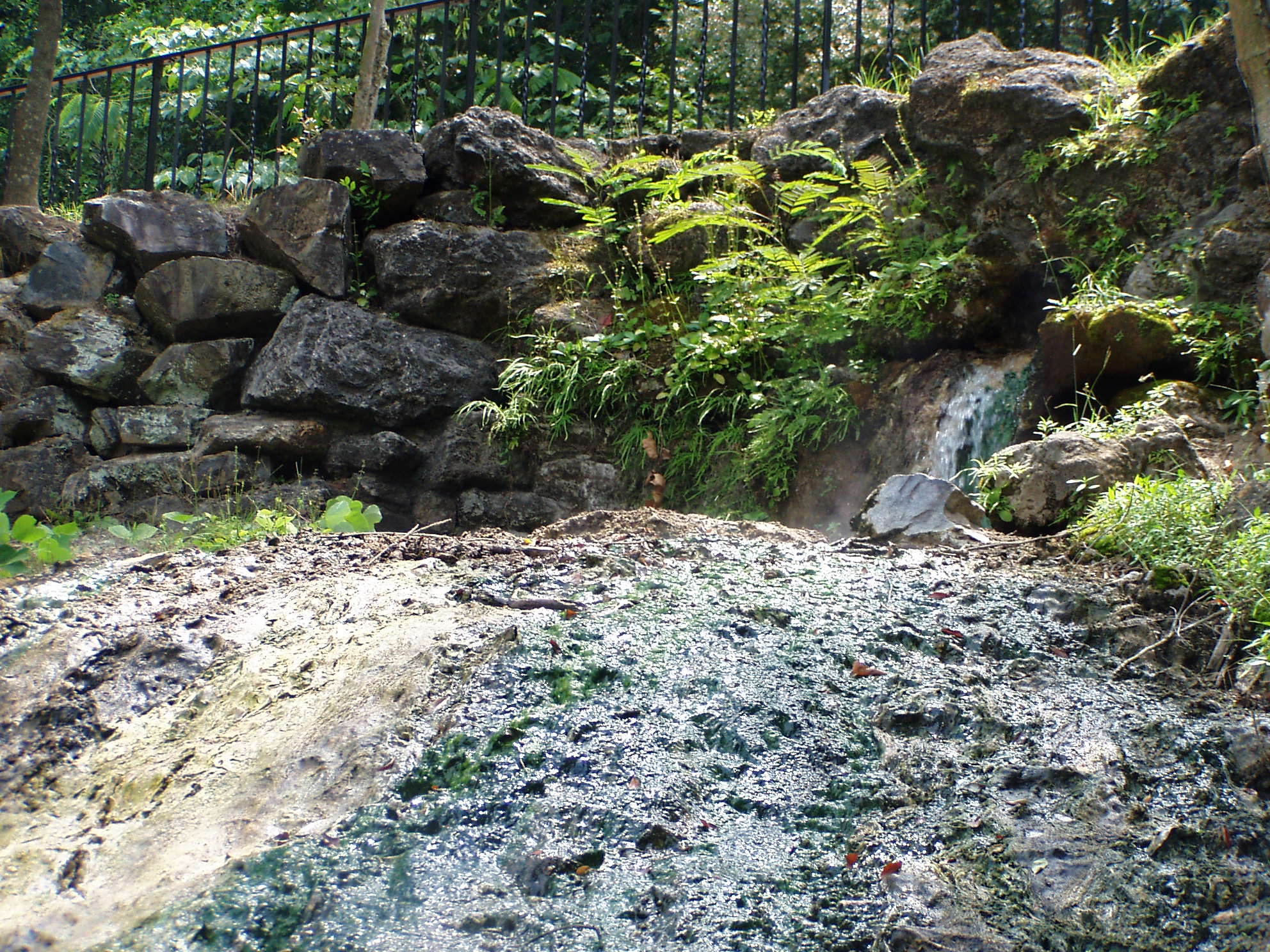
Remaining natural hot springs

The sedimentary rocks in the vicinity of the thermal springs consist of shale, chert, novaculite, sandstone, and conglomerate.

- The Stanley Shale is predominantly a clayey, thinly fissile, black to green shale, with large amounts of sandstone interbedded throughout the formation. The sandstone, when freshly exposed, is a hard, fine-grained, feldspathic, silty sandstone, but weathers easily to a soft, clayey porous material ranging from green to brown in color. Almost all of the low-lying areas in the city of Hot Springs are composed of the Stanley Shale, and it surrounds Hot Springs Mountain on the south, east, and west sides.
- The Hot Springs Sandstone Member of the Stanley Shale, hereafter referred to as the Hot Springs Sandstone, consists of fine- to medium-grained sandstone with some shale and conglomerate. The sandstone is gray, hard and quartzitic, reaching thicknesses up to 6 ft (1.8 m). The shale predominantly occurs at the top of the unit, and the principal bed of the conglomerate occurs at the bottom.
- The Arkansas Novaculite consists of lower, middle, and upper members. The lower member is a massive fractured novaculite, and is the dominant member on Hot Springs Mountain, with a thickness of about 275 ft (84 m) The middle member is a black clay shale interbedded with novaculite, about 10 ft (3.0 m) thick on Hot Springs Mountain. The upper member is chiefly a massive, highly calcareous light gray to black novaculite. It reaches a maximum thickness of 180 ft (55 m) in the area.
- The Polk Creek Shale and Missouri Mountain Shale overlie the Bigfork Chert and generally consist of shale with minor thin layers of quartzitic sandstone. The Polk Creek Shale is a black, fissile, graphitic shale. The Missouri Mountain Shale varies in color, and is soft and argillaceous.
- The Bigfork Chert overlies the Womble Shale and consists almost entirely of chert and silty chert in layers 2 to 12 inches (51 to 305 mm) thick, separated by minor thin beds of black shale. The chert is very brittle and intensely fractured from folding.
- The Womble Shale is the oldest geologic unit that underlies all other exposed units. It is black, hard, and argillaceous shale.

During most of the Paleozoic Era, what became the Ouachita Mountains was the bottom of a shallow sea, where several sedimentary layers were created. About 500 million years ago a collision of the South American Plate with the North American Plate caused the shale and sandstone layers to fracture and fissure, creating mountains of the folded rocks. The thermal springs emerge from the plunging crest line of a large overturned anticline in the Zigzag Mountains of the Ouachita anticlinorium. The overturned anticline plunges toward the southwest into the Mazarn Basin. There are two recognized major thrust faults trending nearly parallel to fold axes that define the northern and southern limits of the thermal springs discharge area. The northern fault extends nearly parallel to Fountain Street northeastward about 9,200 ft (2,800 m) onto the southeast flank of North Mountain, and dips about 26 degrees north. At the northern extent of the thermal springs, this fault is suggested to form along the bedding contact of the Hot Springs Sandstone and Stanley Shale, with the Stanley Shale forming the hanging wall of the fault. The southern fault extends northeastward about 9,000 ft (2,700 m) roughly along the axis of the Hot Springs anticline, and dips about 44 degrees north. It has been proposed that a fault splits away from the southern fault, trends west and connects with the northern fault. A natural ravine trends along the location of this fault. Extensive cracks, joints, and fissures in the Bigfork Chert, Arkansas Novaculite, and the Hot Springs Sandstone allow the water to flow in the thermal springs area. Dissolved minerals in the water precipitate to form the white to tan travertine or "tufa rock" seen near the openings of the hot springs.

== Composition of the water ==
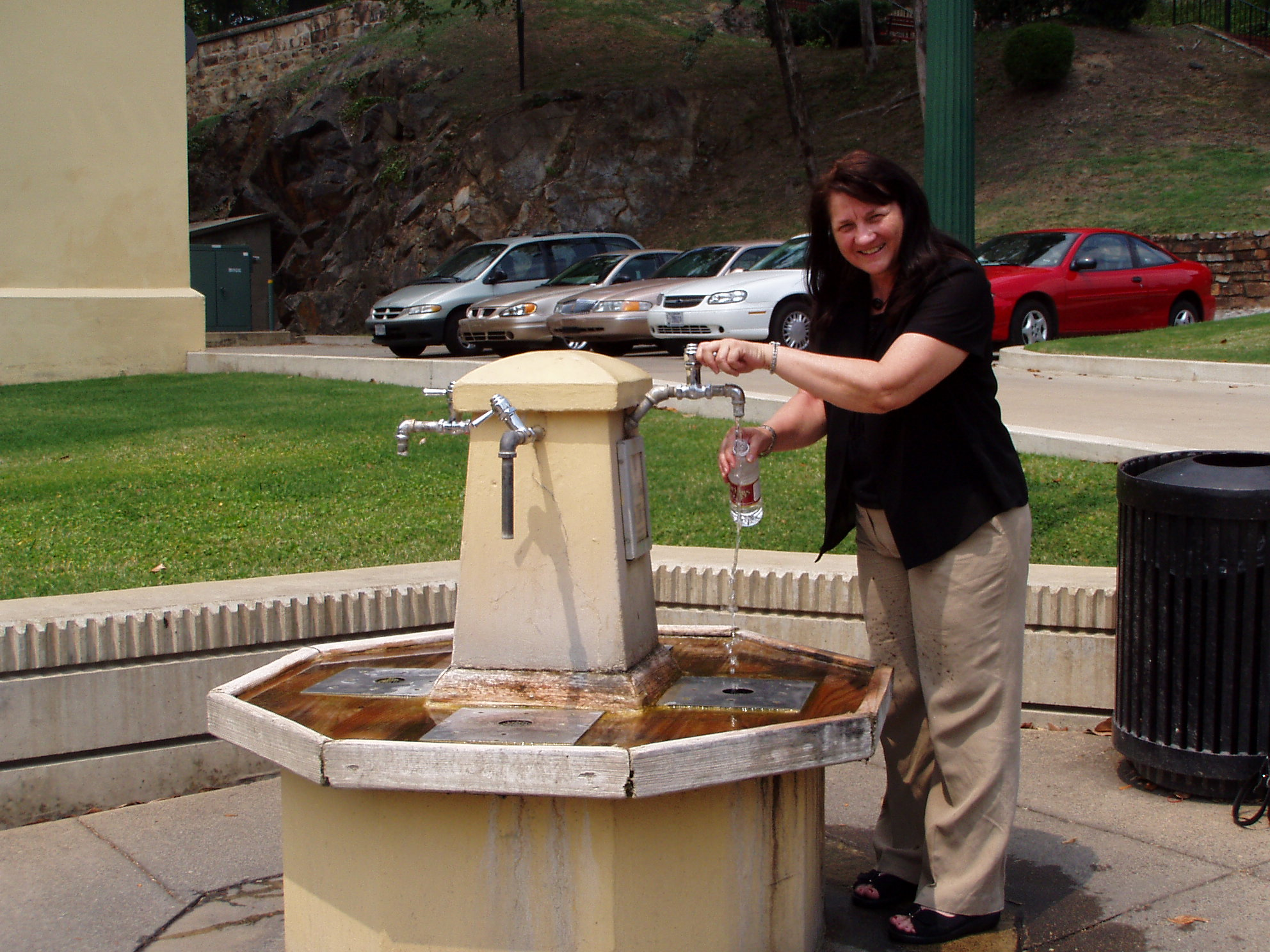
Public fountain

The water all comes from the same deep source, but surface appearance of the springs differed. What was called Mud Spring had a tepid ooze where there was no danger of being scalded. Springs acquired names such as Magnesia, Big Iron, and Arsenic. Big Iron's water, with significant dissolved iron, would precipitate ocherous crusts and stains. Arsenic Spring, on the other hand, contains no detectable traces of its namesake substance. The water from many springs is now combined in one supply, with the total amount of water varying from 750,000 to 950,000 US gallons (2.8 to 3.6 ML) a day. The temperature averages about 143 °F (62 °C). Maximum temperatures have declined about 5 °F (2.8 °C) since records have been kept.

In 1905 curative characteristics were being ascribed to radium and Bertram Boltwood of Yale examined these waters. There is a measurable level of radioactivity primarily due to dissolved radon gas, with some radium. At the time collection and distribution equipment was designed to retain the radon gas, while now it is designed to allow it to escape. The level of exposure to radiation that results from bathing appears to be similar to the level that would result from sitting in the sun for the same period of time. The park water is considered well within safe limits and similar to other natural waters throughout the world.

Drinking water is dispensed from several hot water jug fountains. The hot water is naturally potable. Two cold water springs (Happy Hollow and Whittington Springs) are treated using ozone filtration. Regulations prohibit private individuals from selling the park's waters.

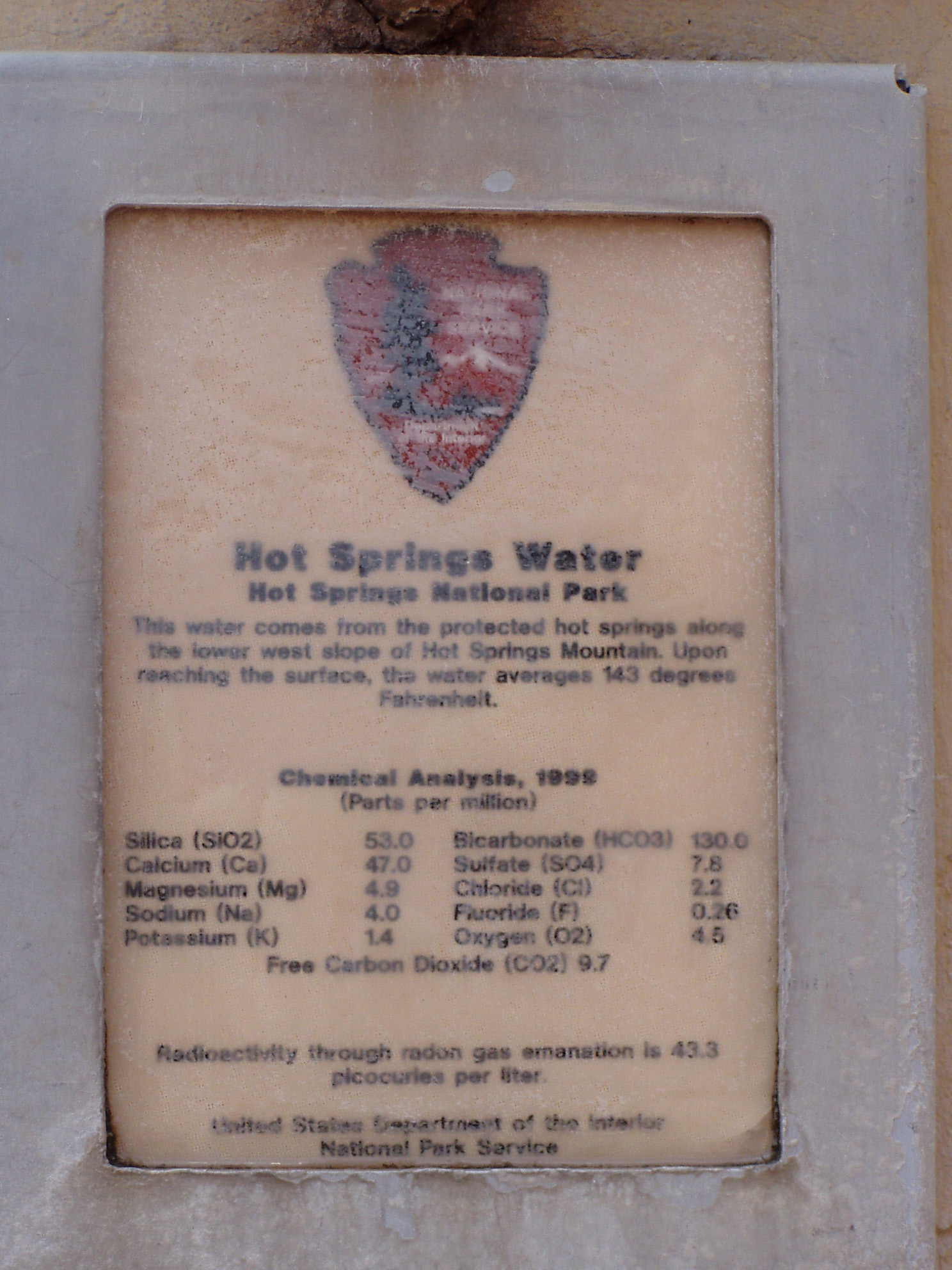
Water composition sign

Chemical	Parts per million
Bicarbonate (HCO_{3}^{−})	130.0
Silica (SiO_{2})	53.0
Calcium (Ca^{2+})	47.0
Free carbon dioxide (CO_{2})	9.7
Sulfate (SO_{4}^{2−})	7.8
Oxygen (O_{2})	4.5
Magnesium (Mg^{2+})	4.9
Chloride (Cl^{−})	2.2
Sodium (Na^{+})	4.0
Potassium (K^{+})	1.4
Fluoride (F^{−})	0.26

== See also ==
- List of national parks of the United States
- Niagara Falls State Park - the first state park in the United States
