= Crystal Mountain Sandstone =

Geologic formation in the United States

- Stratigraphic range: Ordovician
- Type: Formation
- Unit of: none
- Sub-units: none
- Underlies: Mazarn Shale
- Overlies: Collier Shale
- Thickness: 500 to 800 feet

Lithology
- Primary: Sandstone

Location
- Region: Arkansas, Oklahoma
- Country: United States

Type section
- Named for: Crystal Mountains, Montgomery County, Arkansas
- Named by: Albert Homer Purdue

The Crystal Mountain Sandstone is an Ordovician geologic formation in the Ouachita Mountains of Arkansas and Oklahoma. This interval was first described in 1892, but remained unnamed until 1909 as part of a study on the Ouachita Mountains of Arkansas by Albert Homer Purdue.

== See also ==
- List of fossiliferous stratigraphic units in Arkansas
- Paleontology in Arkansas
