= Ouachita Mountains =

Mountain range in Arkansas and Oklahoma, United States

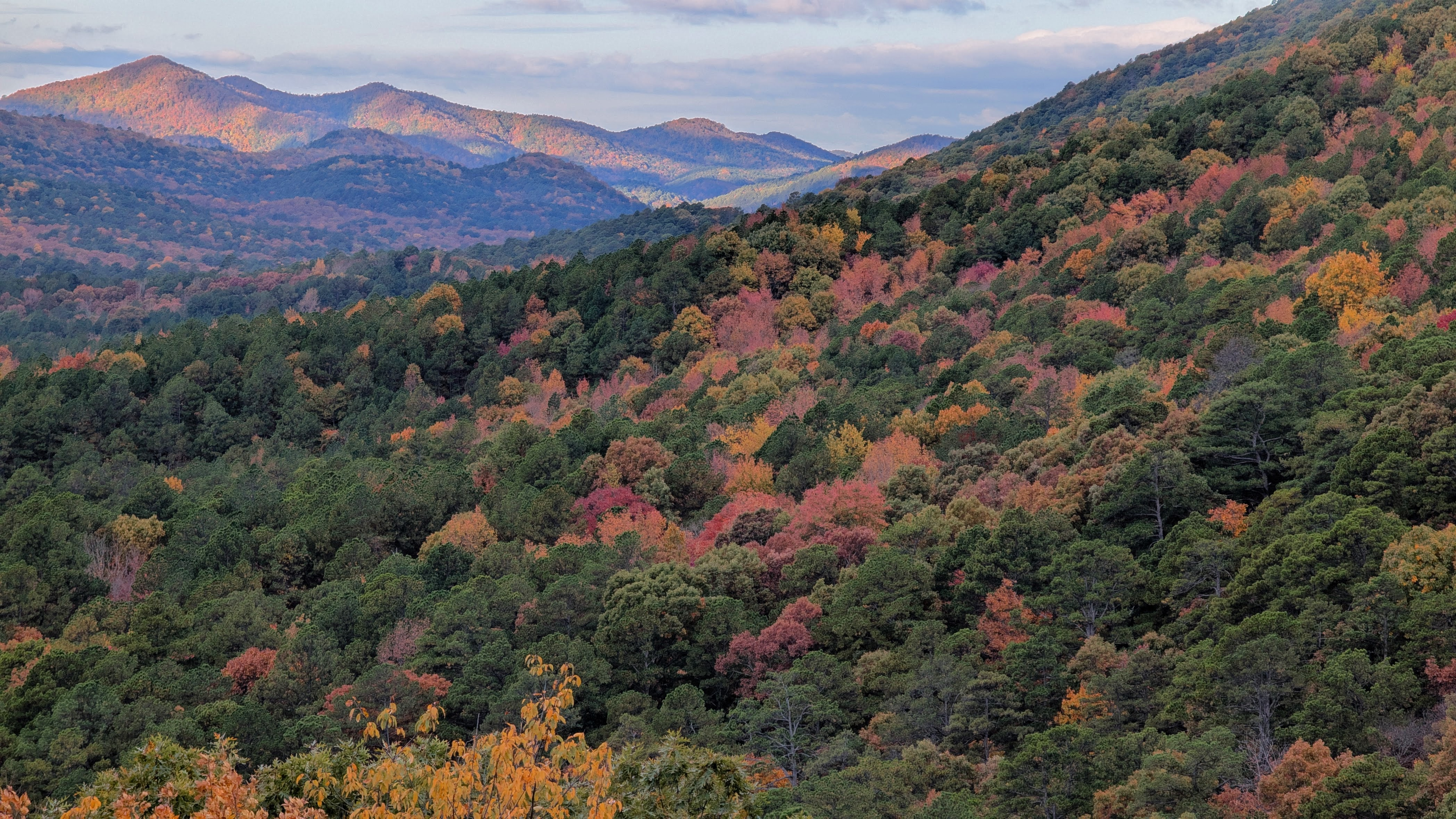
- Sugar Creek Vista, Arkansas

Highest point
- Peak: Mount Magazine
- Elevation: 2,753 ft (839 m)
- Coordinates: 35°10′01″N 93°38′41″W

Naming
- Etymology: Choctaw for "large bison" or "big hunt", or Caddo

Geography
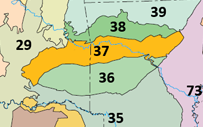
- Level III ecoregions in the region, with the Ouachita Mountains ecoregion marked as (36) (full map)
- Country: United States
- State(s): Arkansas and Oklahoma
- Parent range: U.S. Interior Highlands
- Borders on: Arkansas Valley (37), Mississippi Alluvial Plain (73), South Central Plains (35)

The Ouachita Mountains (/ˈwɒʃɪtɔː/), simply referred to as the Ouachitas, are a mountain range in western Arkansas and southeastern Oklahoma. They are formed by a thick succession of highly deformed Paleozoic strata constituting the Ouachita Fold and Thrust Belt, one of the important orogenic belts of North America. The Ouachitas continue in the subsurface to the southeast, where they make a poorly understood connection with the Appalachians and to the southwest, where they join with the Marathon uplift area of West Texas. Together with the Ozark Plateaus, the Ouachitas form the U.S. Interior Highlands. The highest natural point is Mount Magazine at 2,753 feet (839 m).

The Ouachita Mountains is a Level III ecoregion designated by the Environmental Protection Agency (EPA). The region has been subdivided into six Level IV ecoregions.

== Etymology ==
There are several claims about the origin of the word "Ouachita". Although they differ somewhat, they say essentially the same thing:

- The paleontologist Richard Harlan claimed in 1834 that "Ouachita" is composed of the Choctaw words ouac for "bison" and chito for "large", together meaning "country of large bison". At one time, herds of bison inhabited the lowland areas of the Ouachitas.
- Historian Muriel H. Wright wrote in 1929 that "Ouachita" is composed of the Choctaw words owa for "hunt" and chito for "big", together meaning "big hunt far from home".
- According to the article Ouachita in the Encyclopedia of Oklahoma History and Culture, "Ouachita" comes from the French spelling of the Caddo word washita, meaning "good hunting grounds".

== Geography ==
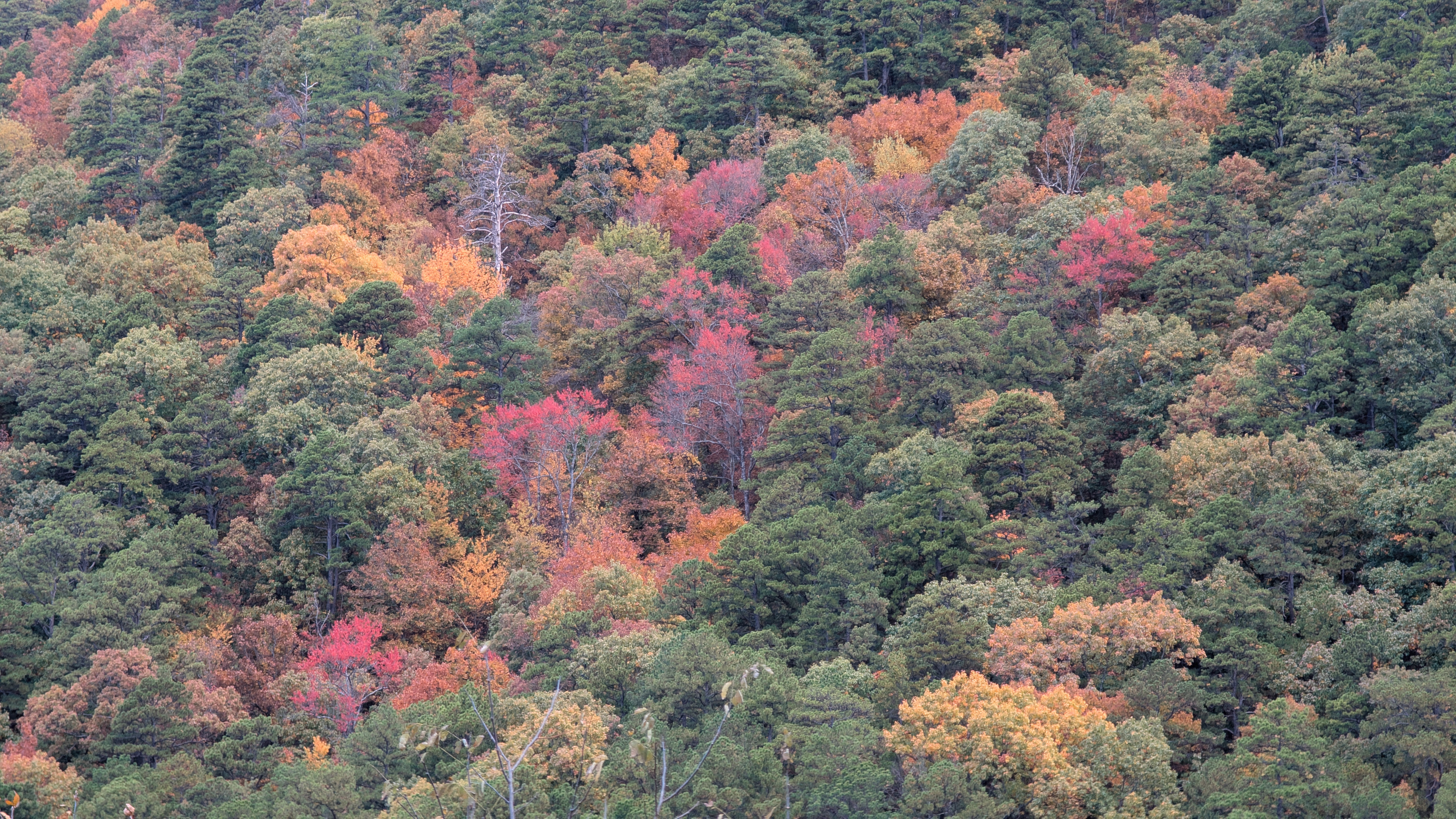
Ouachita Mountain fall foliage

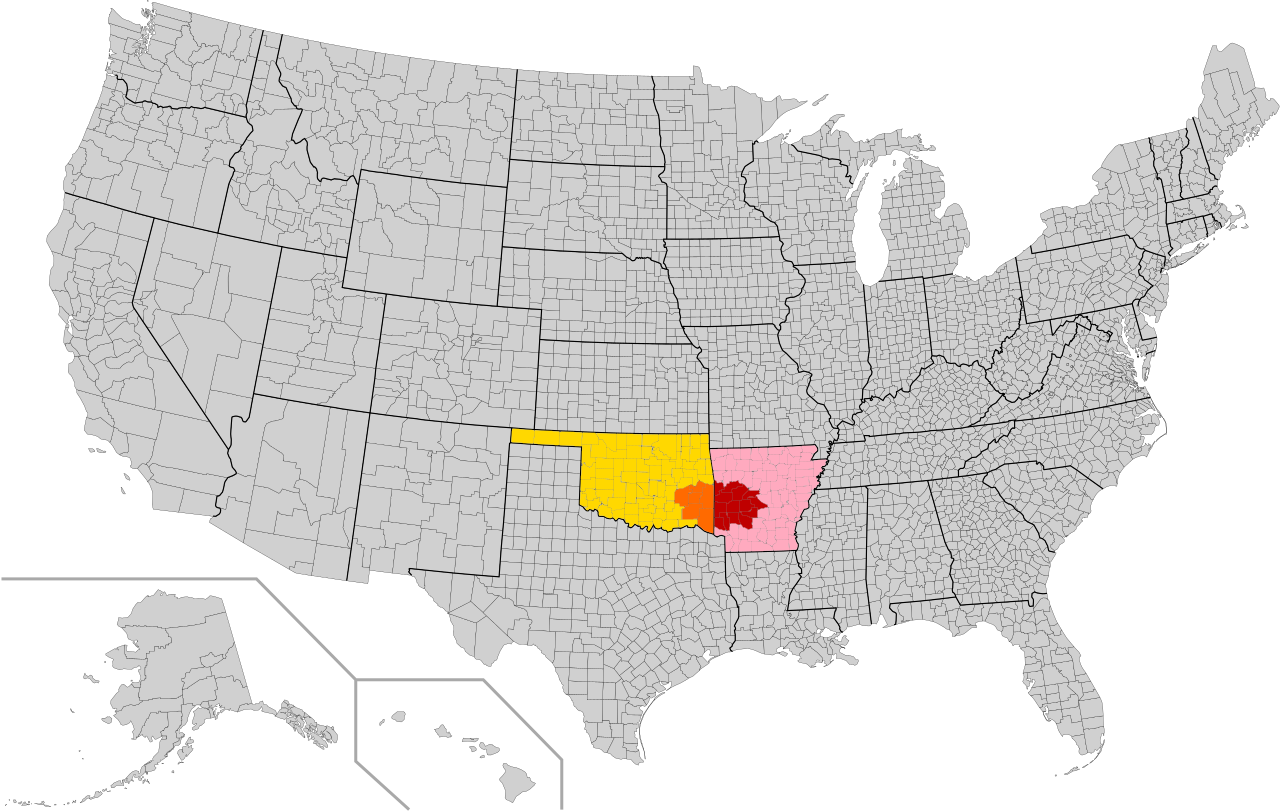
A map of the Ouachita mountains within the states of Arkansas and Oklahoma.

Topographic map of the Ouachita Mountains

The Ouachitas are a major physiographic province of Arkansas and Oklahoma and are generally grouped with the Arkansas River Valley. Together with the Ozark Plateaus, the Ouachitas form the U.S. Interior Highlands, one of few mountainous regions between the Appalachians and Rockies.

=== Flora ===
The Ouachitas are dominated by pine, oak, and hickory. The shortleaf pine (Pinus echinata) and post oak (Quercus stellata) thrive in dry, nutrient-poor soil and are common in upland areas. The maple-leaf oak (Quercus acerifolia) is found at only four sites worldwide, all of which are in the Ouachitas. Some native tree species, such as the eastern red-cedar (Juniperus virginiana), are colonizers of human-disturbed sites.

The Ouachita National Forest covers approximately 1.8 million acres of the Ouachitas. It is one of the largest and oldest national forests in the Southern U.S., created through an executive order by President Theodore Roosevelt on December 18, 1907. There are six wilderness areas within the Ouachita National Forest, which are protected areas designed to minimize the impacts of human activities.

Several plants are endemic to the Ouachitas, including: Agalinis nuttallii, Cardamine angustata var. ouachitana, Carex latebracteata, Galium arkansanum var. pubifolium, Houstonia ouachitana, Hydrophyllum brownei, Liatris compacta, Quercus acerifolia, Polymnia cossatotensis, Solidago ouachitensis, Spiranthes niklasii (near endemic, also found on Crowley's Ridge), Streptanthus maculatus subsp. obtusifolius, Streptanthus squamiformis, Valerianella palmerii, and Vernonia lettermanii.

=== Fauna ===
Bison and elk once found habitat in the Ouachita Mountains, but have since been extirpated. Today, there are large populations of white-tailed deer, coyote, and other common temperate forest animals. Though elusive, hundreds of black bear roam the Ouachitas. Several cryptic species of salamander are endemic to the Ouachitas and have traits that vary from one locale to another.

=== Subranges ===
==== Athens Plateau ====
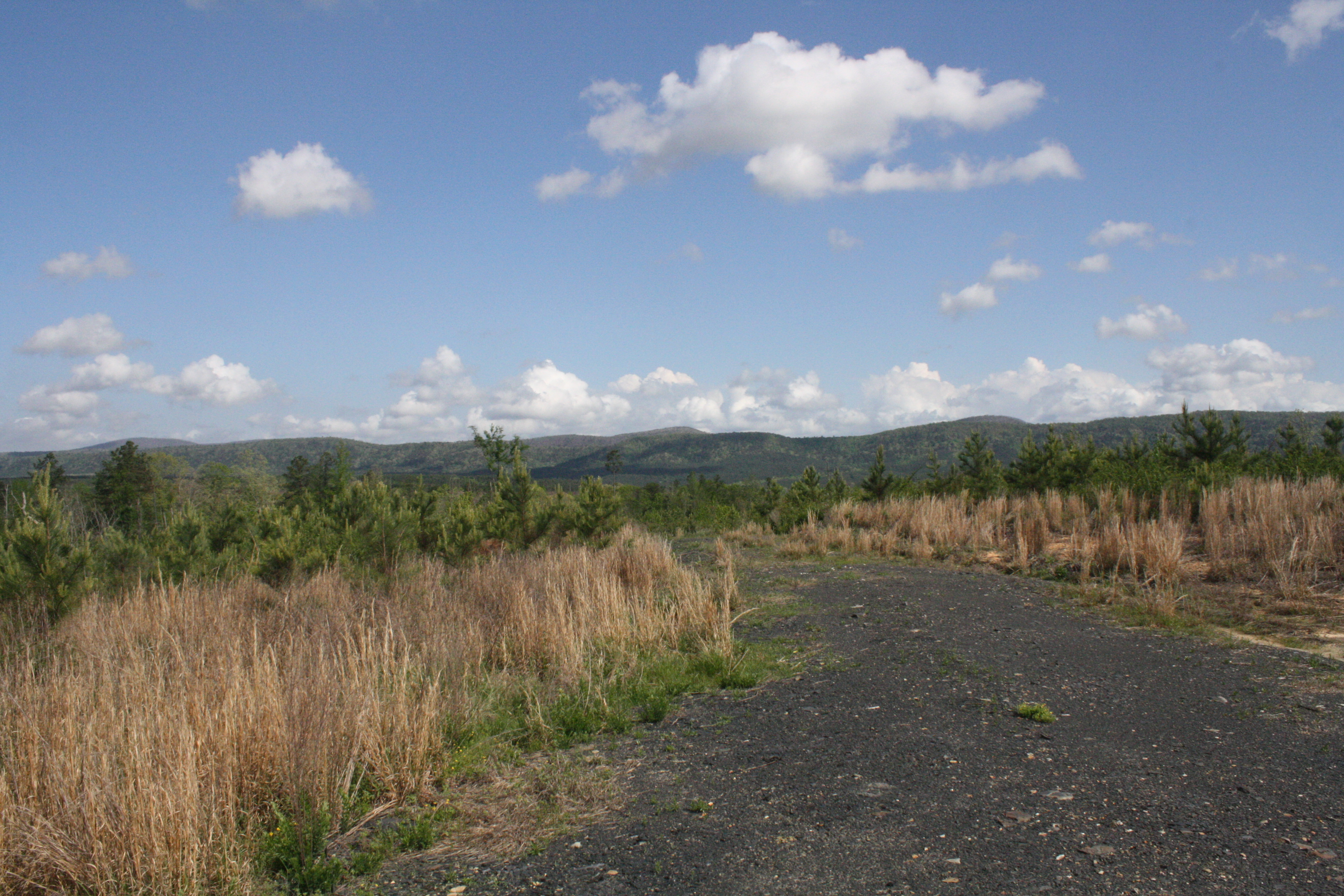
Looking north from Athens Plateau to Ouachita Mountains near Athens, AR

The Athens Plateau or Athens Piedmont (EPA Level IV ecoregion 36a) consists of a series of low relief ridges, none exceeding 1,000 feet (300 m). It is located south of the Ouachitas and extends to the Arkansas-Oklahoma border. The Athens Piedmont runs from Arkadelphia, Arkansas into Oklahoma through Clark, Howard, Pike, and Sevier counties in Arkansas and McCurtain County in Oklahoma. The ecoregion's low ridges and hills are widely underlain by Mississippian Stanley Shale in contrast to other parts of the Ouachitas. Today, pine plantations are widespread; they are far more extensive than in the more rugged parts of the Arkansas Ouachitas. Pastureland and hayland also occur. Cattle and broiler chickens are important farm products.

The Caddo, Cossatot, and Missouri mountains are a high, compact group of mountains composed of the weather-resistant Arkansas Novaculite. They are located primarily in Montgomery and Polk counties, Arkansas. The highest natural point is Raspberry Mountain at 2,358 feet (719 m). The headwaters of multiple rivers are found in this area, including the Caddo, Cossatot, and Little Missouri rivers.

The Cross Mountains are located in Polk and Sevier counties, Arkansas and McCurtain County, Oklahoma. The highest natural point is Whiskey Peak at 1,670 feet (510 m).

The Crystal Mountains are located primarily in Montgomery County, Arkansas. They are so named because of the occurrence of some of the world's finest quartz. The Crystal Mountains are generally taller than the nearby Zig Zag Mountains, achieving elevations over 1,800 feet (550 m).

==== Fourche Mountains ====
The Fourche Mountains (EPA Level IV ecoregion 36d) are a long, continuous chain of east-west mountains composed of the weather-resistant Jackfork Sandstone. They extend from Pulaski County, Arkansas to Atoka County, Oklahoma and are home to several popular sites of interest, including Pinnacle Mountain State Park near Little Rock, Arkansas. The highest natural point is Rich Mountain at 2,681 feet (817 m), which intersects the Arkansas-Oklahoma border near Mena, Arkansas.

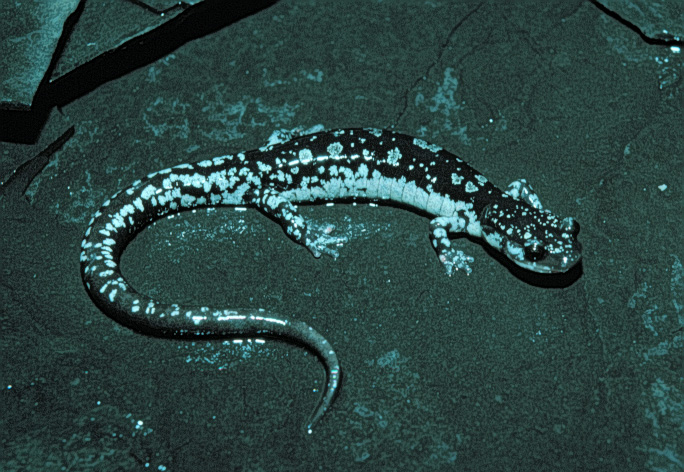
Fourche Mountain salamander

The Fourche Mountains are the archetypal Ouachita Mountains. Forested ridges are heavily forested with oak–hickory–pine forest; intervening valleys are cut into shale. Ridges are longer, habitat continuity is greater, the lithologic mosaic is different, and the topographic orientation is more consistent than in other parts of the Ouachitas. Differences in moisture and temperature between north- and south-facing slopes significantly influence native plant communities; they are products of the prevailing topographic trend. Forests on steep, north-facing slopes are more mesic than on southern aspects; the steepest, south-facing slopes contain shallow, moisture deficient soils supporting shrubs and rocky glades or grassy woodlands. Pastureland and hayland are restricted to a few broad valleys. Logging is not nearly as intensive as in the commercial pine plantations of the less rugged Athens Plateau. Nutrient, mineral, and biochemical water quality parameter concentrations are low in the surface waters of the Fourche range, but turbidity can be higher than in other mountainous parts of the Ouachitas. Although most streams stop flowing during the driest part of the summer, enduring deep pools, high quality habitat, and good water quality allow sensitive aquatic species to survive through the summer. They are the only home and namesake of the Fourche Mountain salamander.

The Fourche Mountains form a major watershed divide between the Arkansas River Basin to the north and the Red River Basin to the south.

The Frontal Ouachita Mountains are located in the Arkansas River Valley and feature a number of isolated landforms. The highest natural point is Mount Magazine at 2,753 feet (839 m), which is also the highest natural point of the Ouachitas and U.S. Interior Highlands. The Frontal Ouachita Mountains are structurally quite different from the rest of the Ouachitas and are sometimes considered a separate range.

The Trap Mountains are located primarily in Garland and Hot Spring counties, Arkansas. The highest natural point is Trap Mountain at 1,310 feet (400 m).

The Zig Zag Mountains are located in Garland County, Arkansas, and are home to the thermal springs of Hot Springs National Park. They are so named because of their unique chevron shape when viewed from above, the result of plunging anticlines and synclines. The Zig Zag Mountains are not exceptionally tall, but do reach heights over 1,400 feet (430 m).

== Geology ==
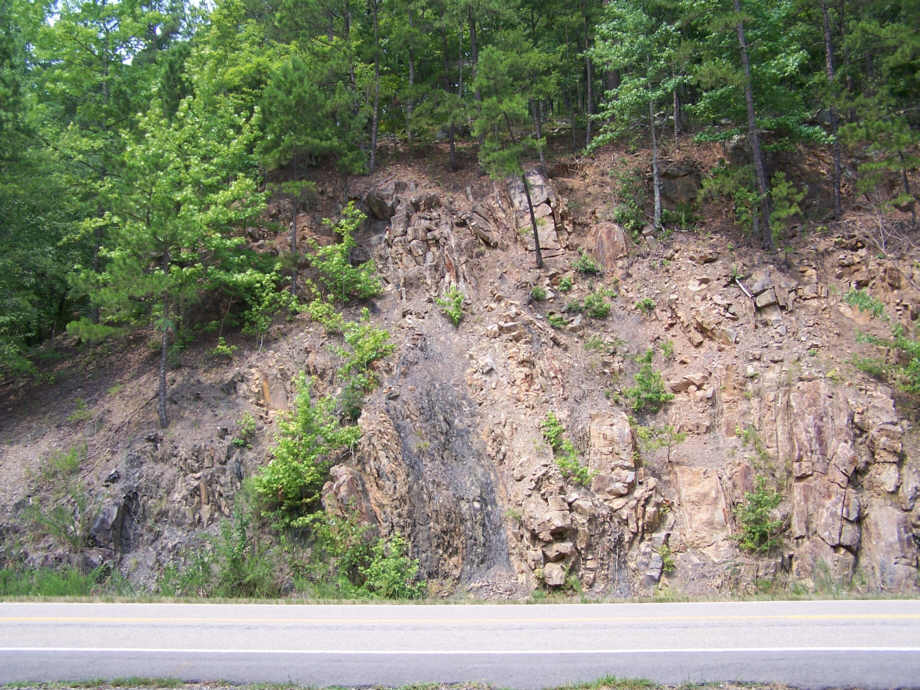
Vertical strata in the eastern Ouachitas

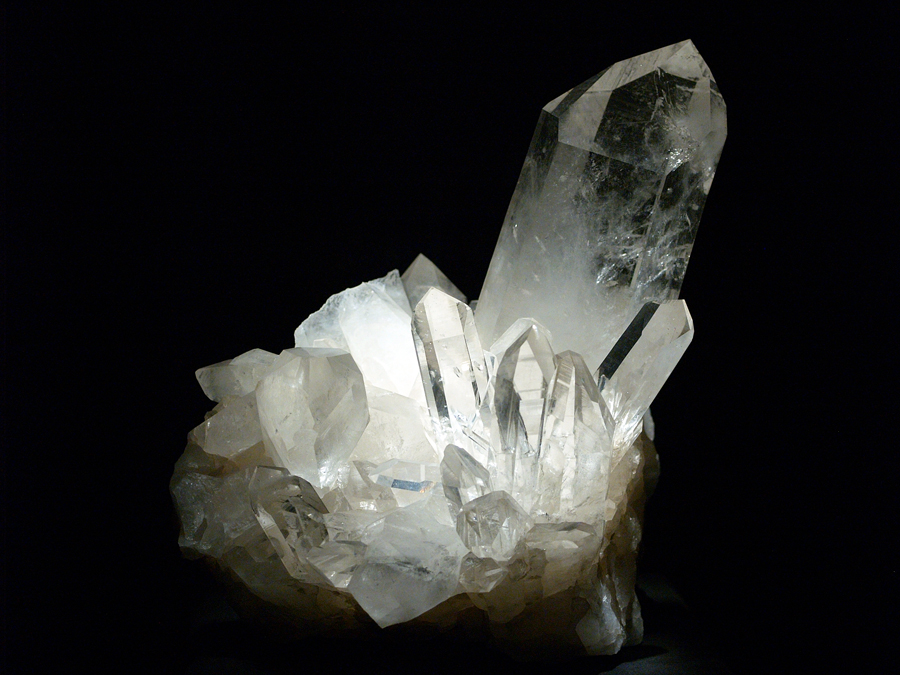
Cluster of Arkansas quartz crystals from the Ouachita Mountains

The Ouachitas are formed by a thick succession of highly deformed Paleozoic strata constituting the Ouachita Fold and Thrust Belt, which crops out for approximately 220 miles (350 km) in western Arkansas and southeastern Oklahoma. In a general sense, the Ouachitas are considered an anticlinorium because the oldest known rocks are located towards the center of the outcrop area. The Ouachitas continue in the subsurface to the Black Warrior Basin of Alabama and Mississippi where they plunge towards the Appalachian Mountains. To the southwest, the Ouachitas join with the Marathon area of west Texas where rocks of the Ouachita Fold and Thrust Belt are briefly exposed.

Unlike many ranges in the United States, the Ouachitas are mostly east-west trending. They are unique because metamorphism and volcanism, features that are common in orogenic belts, are notably absent (with the exception of some low-grade metamorphism). Due to the high degree of folding and faulting, the Ouachitas are clustered into distinct subranges, with ridges separated by relatively broad valleys.

The Ouachitas are known for some of the world's finest quartz, especially around Mount Ida, Arkansas, the quartz capital of the world. The quartz formed after the Ouachita Orogeny when fractures in rocks filled with silica-saturated fluids and, over millions of years, precipitated crystals up to several feet in length. The Ouachitas are also known for novaculite, a variety of chert that has undergone low-grade metamorphism; particular grades found only in Arkansas are used for making whetstones.

=== History ===
Cambrian through Mississippian strata of the Ouachitas were deposited in a narrow, two-sided basin called the Ouachita Trough, which formed as part of a Cambrian failed rift system. Succeeding Pennsylvanian strata of the Ouachitas were deposited in a foreland basin during the early stages of the Ouachita Orogeny. Subduction of the South American Plate beneath the North American Plate resulted in this mountain-building event. Compressional forces caused the crust to buckle, producing complex folds at all scale levels and several overturned sequences. The area of greatest deformation occurred in the Benton-Broken Bow Uplift, which extends from Benton, Arkansas to Broken Bow, Oklahoma. The total height of the Ouachitas is not known, though they may have exceeded 10,000 feet (3,000 m) (based loosely on geologic cross-sections). The terrain has been deeply eroded since the late Paleozoic.

=== Stratigraphy ===
The Ouachitas are composed of Cambrian through Pennsylvanian sedimentary rocks. The Collier Shale, located at the core of the Benton-Broken Bow Uplift, is the oldest exposed formation of the Ouachitas. The Atoka Formation, which was deposited much later during the Pennsylvanian, has the largest areal extent of any of the Paleozoic formations in Arkansas. The geologic formations of the Ouachitas are as follows (in order of ascending age).

Formation	Period	Approximate thickness
Collier Shale	Late Cambrian and Early Ordovician	1,000 feet (300 m)
Crystal Mountain Sandstone	Early Ordovician	850 feet (260 m)
Mazarn Shale	Early Ordovician	2,500 feet (760 m)
Blakely Sandstone	Middle Ordovician	700 feet (210 m)
Womble Shale	Middle Ordovician	1,200 feet (370 m)
Bigfork Chert	Middle and Late Ordovician	750 feet (230 m)
Polk Creek Shale	Late Ordovician	225 feet (69 m)
Blaylock Sandstone	Silurian	1,200 feet (370 m)
Missouri Mountain Shale	Silurian	300 feet (91 m)
Arkansas Novaculite	Devonian and Early Mississippian	900 feet (270 m)
Stanley Shale	Mississippian	10,000 feet (3,000 m)
Jackfork Sandstone	Early Pennsylvanian	6,000 feet (1,800 m)
Johns Valley Shale	Early Pennsylvanian	1,500 feet (460 m)
Atoka Formation	Early and Middle Pennsylvanian	25,000 feet (7,600 m)
Hartshorne Sandstone	Middle Pennsylvanian	300 feet (91 m)
McAlester Formation	Middle Pennsylvanian	2,300 feet (700 m)
Savanna Formation	Middle Pennsylvanian	1,600 feet (490 m)
Boggy Formation	Middle Pennsylvanian	1,100 feet (340 m)

== History ==
The mountains were home to the Ouachita tribe, for which they were named. Later French explorers translated the name to its present spelling. The first recorded exploration was in 1541 by Hernando de Soto. Later, in 1804, President Jefferson sent William Dunbar and Dr. George Hunter to the area after the Louisiana Purchase. Hot Springs National Park became one of the nation's first parks in 1832. The Battle of Devil's Backbone was fought here at the ridge of the same name in 1863. In August 1990, the U.S. Forest Service discontinued clearcutting as the primary tool for harvesting and regenerating short leaf, pine and hardwood forests in the Ouachita National Forest.

== Tourism ==
The Ouachita Mountains contain the Ouachita National Forest, Hot Springs National Park and Lake Ouachita, as well as numerous state parks and scenic byways mostly throughout Arkansas. They also contain the Ouachita National Recreation Trail, a 223-mile-long (359 km) hiking trail through the heart of the mountains. The trail runs from Talimena State Park in Oklahoma to Pinnacle Mountain State Park near Little Rock. It is a well maintained, premier trail for hikers, backpackers, and mountain bikers (for only selected parts of the trail).

The Talimena Scenic Drive begins at Mena, and traverses 54 miles (87 km) of Winding Stair and Rich Mountains, long narrow east-west ridges which extend into Oklahoma. Rich Mountain reaches an elevation of 2,681 feet (817 m) in Arkansas near the Oklahoma border. The two lane winding road is similar in routing, construction, and scenery to the Blue Ridge Parkway of the Appalachian Mountains.

=== Sites of interest ===
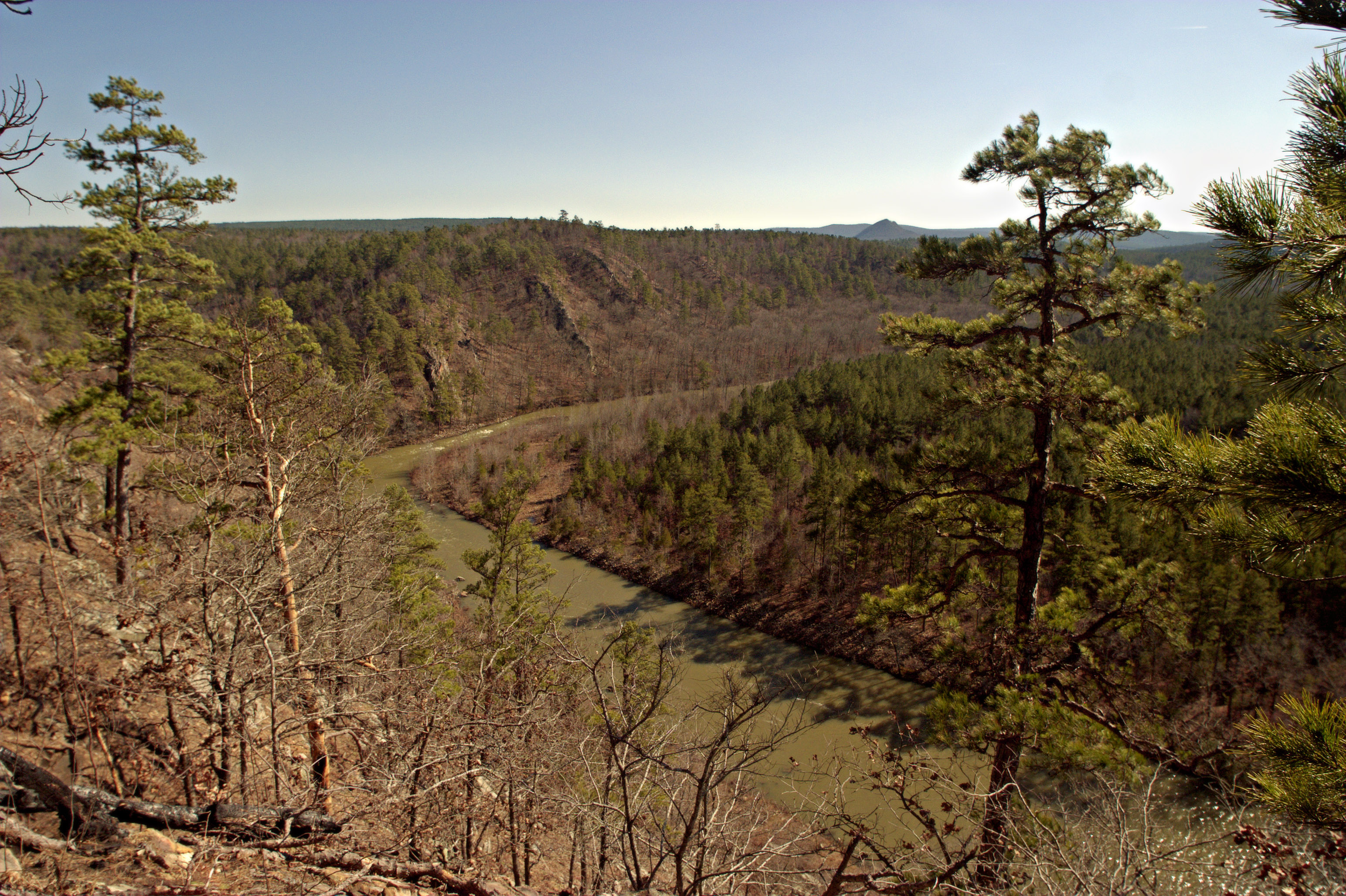
The South Fourche La Fave River, Ouachita Mountains, Arkansas

- Beavers Bend State Park
- Black Fork Mountain Wilderness
- Caney Creek Wilderness
- Cossatot River State Park-Natural Area
- Flatside Wilderness
- Heavener Runestone Park
- Hot Springs National Park
- Jack Creek Recreation Area
- Lake Catherine
- Lake Hamilton
- Lake Maumelle
- Lake Ouachita
- Mount Magazine State Park
- Pinnacle Mountain State Park
- Queen Wilhelmina State Park
- Mount Nebo State Park
