= Aphlebia =

Aphlebiae are the imperfect or irregular leaf endings commonly found on ferns and fossils of ferns from the Carboniferous Period, but seem to have disappeared by the beginning of the Mesozoic. According to the United States Geological Survey in 1983, “The discovery in recent years of Aplebiæ attached to the rachis of many species of Pecopteris and Sphenopteris, such as P. dentata, P. Biotii, P. abbreviata, and Sphenopteris cremate strengthens the view now generally entertained, that most of the species of Aphlebia are stipal abortive pinnæ growing from the bases of primary or secondary rachises” (101). The word itself is derived from the Greek "phleb-", meaning vein, and "a-", meaning without.
