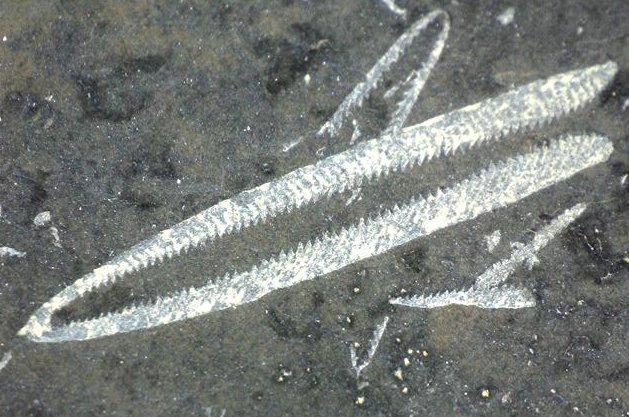
- Didymograptus murchisoni, Wales

Scientific classification
- Kingdom: Animalia
- Phylum: Hemichordata
- Class: Pterobranchia
- Subclass: Graptolithina
- Genus: †Didymograptus; McCoy 1851

Species
- D. artus; D. euodus; D. gracilis; D. murchisoni; D. nicholsoni

= Didymograptus =

Didymograptus Temporal range: Middle Ordovician ~478–443 Ma

Genus of marine worm-like animals

Didymograptus is an extinct genus of graptolites with two rows of cups. They lived during the Middle Ordovician, to Late Ordovician.

== Distribution ==
Fossils of Didymograptus have been found in Argentina, Australia, Bolivia, Canada (Northwest Territories, Quebec, Yukon, Newfoundland and Labrador), Chile, China, Colombia (Tarqui, Huila), the Czech Republic, Estonia, France, Iran, Morocco, New Zealand, Norway, Peru, Portugal, the Russian Federation, Saudi Arabia, Spain, Sweden, the United Kingdom, the United States (Alaska, California, Idaho, Nevada, New York, Utah), and Venezuela.
