= Stratotype =

Reference location for a specific type of rock layering (strata)

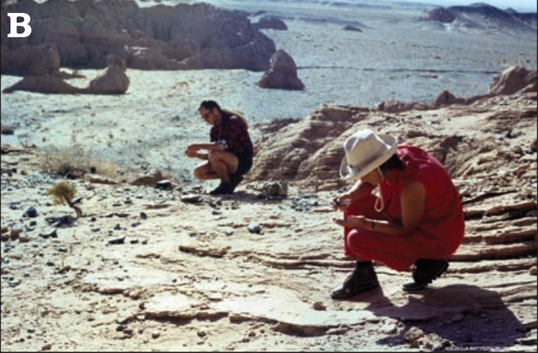
The Khulsan locality, which is the stratotype of the Barun Goyot Formation, Mongolia

In geology, a stratotype or type section is the physical location or outcrop of a particular reference exposure of a stratigraphic sequence or stratigraphic boundary. If the stratigraphic unit is layered, it is called a stratotype, whereas the standard of reference for unlayered rocks is the type locality.

It can also be defined as "The particular sequence of strata chosen as standard of reference of a layered stratigraphic unit."

When a stratigraphic unit is nowhere fully exposed, the original type section may be supplemented with reference sections covering the full thickness of the unit. A reference section may also be defined when the original type section is poorly exposed, or for historical units which were designated without specifying a type section according to more modern standards.

== See also ==
- Global Boundary Stratotype Section and Point
