= Bloyd Formation =

Geologic formation in Arkansas, United States

- Stratigraphic range: Pennsylvanian
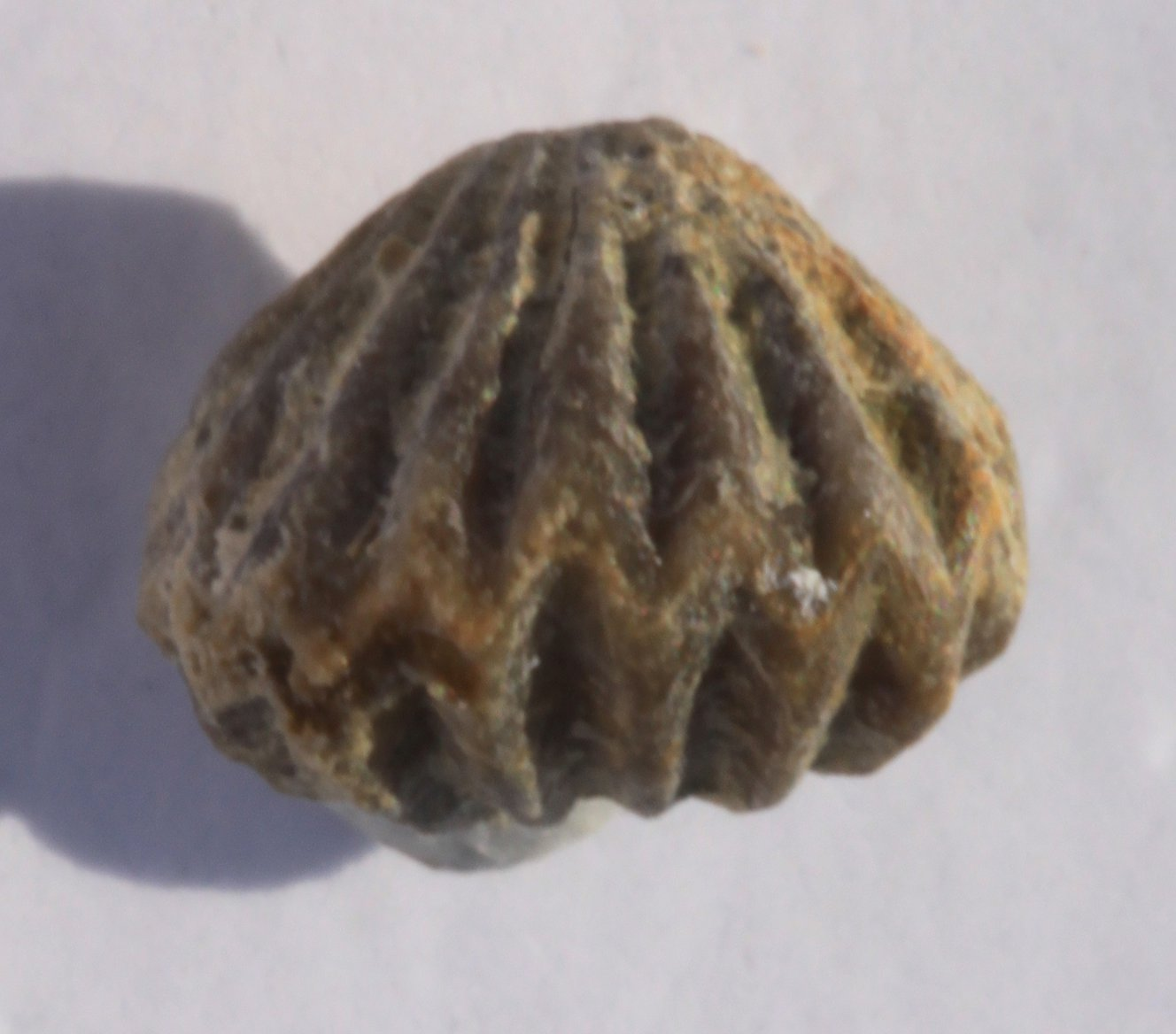
- Fossil from the Bloyd Formation
- Type: Formation
- Sub-units: Baldwin coal, Brentwood Member, Dye Shale Member, Kessler Limestone Member, Parthenon Sandstone Member, and Woolsey Member
- Underlies: Atoka Formation
- Overlies: Hale Formation

Lithology
- Primary: Shale
- Other: Sandstone, limestone

Location
- Region: Arkansas
- Country: United States

Type section
- Named for: Bloyd Mountain, Washington County, Arkansas
- Named by: Albert Homer Purdue

The Bloyd Formation, or Bloyd Shale, is a geologic formation in Arkansas. It preserves fossils dating back to the Carboniferous period.

== Stratigraphy ==
The Bloyd Formation conformably overlies the Hale Formation and unconformably underlies the Atoka Formation. Five formal and one informal members are recognized in the Bloyd Formation (in stratigraphic order):

- Kessler Limestone Member
- Dye Shale Member
- Parthenon Sandstone Member (also known as the "middle Bloyd sandstone")
- Woolsey Member
- Baldwin coal (an informal unit at the top of the Woolsey Member)
- Brentwood Limestone Member

In the eastern parts of the Ozarks in Arkansas, the Bloyd Formation becomes undifferentiated with the underlying Hale Formation and is called the Witts Springs Formation.

== Paleontology ==
=== Brachiopods ===
- Anthracospirifer
  - A. newberryi
- Antiquatonia
  - A. coloradoensis
- Hustedia
  - H. brentwoodensis
- Linoproductus
  - L. nodosus
- Orthotetes
- Rhynchopora
  - R. magnicosta
- Tesuquea
  - T. formosa

=== Bryozoans ===
- Anisotrypa
- Coscinotrypa
  - C. fayettevillensis
  - C. gracilens
- Fenestella
  - F. morrowensis
  - F. serratula
  - F. venusta
- Fistulipora
- Glyptopora
  - G. crassitoma
- Lyropora
- Matheropora
  - M. triseriata
- Polypora
  - P. anastomosa
  - P. constricta
  - P. elliptica
  - P. kesslerensis
  - P. magna
  - P. purduei
  - P. triseriata
  - P. washingtonensis
- Phyllopora
  - P. cribosa
- Prismopora
  - P. concava
- Rhombopora
  - R. attenuata
  - R. lepidodendroides
  - R. snideri
  - R. tabulata
- Septopora
  - S. implexa
  - S. reversispina
- Sulcoretepora
  - S. brentwoodensis
  - S. sinuomarginata
- Tabulipora
  - T. tuberculata

=== Cephalopods ===
- Axinolobus
  - A. modulus
  - A. quinni
- Bisatoceras
  - B. micromphalus
  - B. secundum
- Boesites
  - B. scotti
- Branneroceras
  - B. branneri
- Cancelloceras
- Cymoceras
  - C. miseri
- Diaboloceras
  - D. neumeieri
- Euloxoceras
- Gaitherites
  - G. morrowensis
- Gastrioceras
  - G. adaense
  - G. araium
  - G. attenuatum
  - G. branneri
  - G. fittsi
- Glaphyrites
  - G. depressus
  - G. morrowensis
  - G. oblatus
- Homoceratoides
  - H. crancens
- Liroceras
- Metadimorphoceras
  - M. subdivisum
- Mooreoceras
  - M. normale
- Perigrammoceras
- Phaneroceras
  - P. compressum
  - P. kesslerense
- Proshumardites
  - P. morrowanus
- Pseudoparalegoceras
  - P. compressum
  - P. kesslerense
- Pseudopronorites
  - P. arkansiensis
  - P. quinni
- Pseudorthoceras
  - P. knoxense
- Pygmaeoceras
  - P. pygmaeum
  - P. solidum
- Solenochilus
- Stearoceras
  - S. smithi
- Stenopronorites
  - S. arkansiensis
- Syngastrioceras
  - S. globosum
  - S. oblatum
- Verneuilites
  - V. pygmaeus
- Wiedeyoceras
  - W. smithi

=== Conodonts ===
- Adetognathus
  - A. gigantus
  - A. lautus
- Hibbardella
- Idiognathodus
  - I. sinuosis
- Idiognathoides
  - I. convexus
- Ligonodina
  - L. typa
- Metalonchodina
- Neognathodus
  - N. kunamai
- Neoprioniodus
- Spathognathodus
  - S. minutus
- Streptognathodus
  - S. suberectus

=== Crinoids ===
- Affinocrinus
  - A. grandis
  - A. progressus
- Alcimocrinus
  - A. girtyi
- Allocatillocrinus
  - A. rotundus
  - A. rotundus multibrachiatus
- Anchicrinus
  - A. planulatus
  - A. rugosus
- Anobasicrinus
  - A. braggsi
- Arkacrinus
  - A. constrictus
  - A. dubius
- Atokacrinus
  - A. tumulosus
- Calycocrinus
  - C. furnishi
  - C. symmetricus
- Cibolocrinus
  - C. circulus
  - C. regularis
  - C. spinosus
  - C. tumidus
- Cromyocrinus
  - C. grandis
- Dicromyocrinus
  - D. optimus
  - D. subaplatus
- Diphuicrinus
  - D. croneisi
  - D. pentanodus
- Endelocrinus
  - E. matheri
- Globacrocrinus
  - G. pirum
- Lassanocrinus
  - L. daileyi
  - L. minutus
  - L. multinodus
  - L. nodus
  - L. strigosus
- Lecythiocrinus
  - L. asymmetricus
- Megaliocrinus
  - M. aplatus
  - M. exotericus
- Metacromyocrinus
  - M. gillumi
  - M. papulosus
- Metautharocrinus
  - M. cockei
  - M. spinifer
- Morrowocrinus
  - M. fosteri
- Palmerocrinus
  - P. kesslerensis
- Paracromyocrinus
  - P. oklahomensis
- Paradelocrinus
  - P. aequabilis
- Paragassizocrinus
  - P. caliculus
  - P. magnus
- Paramphicrinus
  - P. magnus
- Perimestocrinus
  - P. pumilus
  - P. teneris
- Phacelocrinus
  - P. brevis
  - P. rosei
- Planacrocrinus
  - P. conicus
  - P. minutus
- Platyacrocrinus
  - P. brentwoodensis
- Platycrinites
- Sciadiocrinus
  - S. cascus
  - S. crassacanthus
- Scytalocrinus
  - S. crassibrachiatus
- Stenopecrinus
  - S. ornatus
- Stereobrachicrinus
  - S. pustulosus
- Strongylocrinus
  - S. hansoni
  - S. ornatus
- Ulrichicrinus
  - U. oklahoma
  - U. pentanodus

=== Flora ===
- Archaeolithophyllum
  - A. missouiense
- Cuneiphycus
  - C. aliquantulus
- Donezella
- Eflugelia
- Girvanella
  - G. minuta
- Paraepimastopora
- Stachedoides
  - S. spissa

=== Foraminifera ===
- Ammodiscus
- Ammovertella
- Archaediscus
- Asteroarchaediscus
  - A. rugosus
- Biseriella
- Calcitornella
  - C. adherens
- Climacammina
- Diplospahaerina
  - D. inaequalis
- Endothyra
- Endothyranella
- Eolasiodiscus
  - E. donbassicus
- Eosigmoilina
- Eostafella
- Hemigordius
  - H. harltoni
- Millerella
  - M. marblensis
  - M. pressa
- Monotaxinoides
  - M. transitorius
- Neoarchaediscus
- Palaeonubecularia
- Paramillerella
  - P. pinguis
- Planoendothyra
  - P. evoluta
- Plectogyra
- Pseudoglomospira
- Tetrataxis
  - T. maxima
- Trepeilopsis
  - T. minima
- Tuberatina
  - T. plana
- Turrispiroides
  - T. multivolutus

=== Ostracods ===
- Amphissites
  - A. confluens
  - A. nodosus
  - A. rothi
- Bairdiolites
- Hollinella
  - H. bassleri
- Kegelites
- Kirkbya
  - K. bendensis
  - K. jolliffana
- Pseudoparaparchites

=== Sponges ===
- Haplistion
  - H. sphaericum
- Steioderma
  - S. hadra
- Virgaspongia
  - V. ichnata

=== Trace Fossils ===
- Conostichus
  - C. arkansanus

=== Incertae sedis ===
- Asphaltina
  - A. cordillerensis
- Clacisphaera
  - C. laevis
- Nostocites
- Osagia
- Proninella
  - P. strigosa

== See also ==
- List of fossiliferous stratigraphic units in Arkansas
- Paleontology in Arkansas
