= Hindsville Formation =

Geologic unit in northern Arkansas and eastern Oklahoma

Limestone
- Stratigraphic range: Mississippian
- Type: Member (AR), Formation (OK)
- Unit of: Batesville Formation (AR)
- Sub-units: none (AR)
- Underlies: Fayetteville Shale
- Overlies: Moorefield Formation

Lithology
- Primary: Limestone

Location
- Region: Arkansas, Oklahoma
- Country: United States

Type section
- Named for: Hindsville, Madison County, Arkansas
- Named by: Albert Homer Purdue and Hugh Dinsmore Miser

The Hindsville Formation, or Hindsville Limestone Member of the Batesville Formation, is a geologic unit in northern Arkansas and eastern Oklahoma that dates to the Chesterian Series of the late Mississippian. Named for the town of Hindsville in Madison County, Arkansas, this unit is recognized as a member of the Batesville Formation in Arkansas and a geologic formation in Oklahoma. Although, some workers have proposed raising the rank of this interval in Arkansas to formation status. Both the Batesville and Hindsville Formations overlie the Moorefield Formation and underlie the Fayetteville Shale.

== Paleofauna ==
=== Blastoids ===
- Pentremites
  - P. elongatus
  - P. godoni
  - P. patei

=== Bryozoans ===
- Archimedes
  - A. communis
  - A. distans
  - A. intermedius
- Batostomella
  - B. anomala
  - B. parvula
  - B. spinulosa
- Callocladia
  - C. elegans
- Coeloclemis
  - C. tumida
- Dyscritella
  - D. insequalis
  - D. robusta
- Fenestella
  - F. cestriensis
  - F. serratula
- Fistulipora
  - F. excelens
  - F. excelens harrisonensis
  - F. excelens williamsi
- Idioclema
  - I. insigne
- Polypora
  - P. mesleriana
- Pycnopora
  - P. bella
  - P. hirsuta
  - P. regularis
- Rhabdomeson
  - R. tubum
- Rhombopora
  - R. persimilis miser
- Septopora
  - S. pinnata
- Stenocladia
  - S. frondosa
- Streblotrypa
  - S. nicklesi
  - S. nicklesi robusta
- Sulcoretepora
  - S. pustulosa arcta
- Syringoclemis
  - S. biserialis
- Tabulipora
  - T. cestriensis
  - T. emaciata arkansana
  - T. emaciata inaequalis
  - T. emaciata megastyla
  - T. gracilis
  - T. inermis
  - T. intermittens harrisonensis
  - T. longicamerata
  - T. maculosa
  - T. miseri
  - T. miseri tubulata
  - T. mutabilis
  - T. perattenuata
  - T. poculoformis
  - T. ramosa fayettevillensis
  - T. simulans

=== Crinoids ===
- Abrotocrinus
- Agassizocrinus
  - A. conicus
- Bronaughocrinus
  - B. cherokeensus
- Cryphiocrinus
  - C. bowsheri
  - C. girtyi
- Dichocrinus
  - D. girtyi
- Pentaramicrinus
  - P. nitidus
- Staphylocrinus

== See also ==
- List of fossiliferous stratigraphic units in Arkansas
- Paleontology in Arkansas
