= Johns Valley Formation =

Geologic formation in Arkansas and Oklahoma, United States

- Stratigraphic range: Carboniferous: Pennsylvanian
- Type: Formation
- Underlies: Atoka Formation
- Overlies: Jackfork Sandstone

Lithology
- Primary: Shale
- Other: Sandstone

Location
- Region: Arkansas and Oklahoma
- Country: United States

Type section
- Named for: Johns Valley, Pushmataha County, Oklahoma
- Named by: Edward Oscar Ulrich, 1927

The Johns Valley Formation is a geologic formation in Arkansas and Oklahoma. It preserves fossils dating back to the Carboniferous period.

== Paleofauna ==
=== Bryozoans ===
- Acanthocladia
  - A. ouachitensis
- Fenestella
  - F. bendensis
  - F. grandis
  - F. granularis
  - F. kosomensis
  - F. mimica
  - F. oklahomensis
- Leioclema
  - L. pushmatahensis
- Rhombopora
  - R. johnsvalleyensis
  - R. nitidula
- Sulcoretepora
  - S. elegans

=== Cephalopods ===
- Bactrites
- Cravenoceras
  - C. scotti
- Cyclocerid
- Dentoceras
  - D. belemnitiforme
- Eumorphoceras
  - E. plummeri
- Gastrioceras
  - G. adaense
  - G. fittsi
- Girtyoceras
  - G. limatum
- Glaphyrites
  - G. oblatus
  - G. morrowensis
- Goniatites
  - G. choctawensis
  - G. granosus
- Homoceratoides
  - H. cracens
- Mariceras
- Metacoceras
- Mitorthoceras
  - M. perfilosum
- Mooreoceras
  - M. normale
- Neoglyphioceras
  - N. cloudi
- Orthoceracone
- Paracravenoceras
  - P. ozarkense
- Paradimorphoceras
- Pseudoparalegoceras
  - P. kesslerense
- Pseudothoceras
  - P. knoxense
- Rayonnoceras
  - R. vaughanianum
- Stenopronorites
  - S. arkansiensis

== See also ==
- List of fossiliferous stratigraphic units in Arkansas
- List of fossiliferous stratigraphic units in Oklahoma
- Paleontology in Arkansas
- Paleontology in Oklahoma
