= Arkadelphia Marl =

Geologic formation in Arkansas, United States

- Stratigraphic range: Late Maastrichtian
- Type: Formation
- Underlies: Midway Group
- Overlies: Nacatoch Formation
- Thickness: 120 to 160 feet

Location
- Region: Arkansas
- Country: United States

Type section
- Named for: Arkadelphia, Clark County, Arkansas
- Named by: Robert Thomas Hill

The Arkadelphia Marl, also called the Arkadelphia Formation, is a geologic formation in Arkansas in Clark, Nevada, and Hempstead counties. It preserves fossils dating back to the late Maastrichtian stage of the Cretaceous period.

== Paleofauna ==
=== Bony fish ===
Bony fish reported from the Arkadelphia Formation
| Genus | Species | Presence | Material | Notes | Images |
|---|---|---|---|---|---|
| Albulidae indet. | Indeterminate | Cabot, Arkansas. | 4 small, eroded otoliths. | A bonefish. | |
| Ampheristus | A. cf. A. americanus | Cabot, Arkansas. | 6 otoliths. | An ophidiiform. | |
| Anguilla | A.? chickasawae | Cabot, Arkansas. | 6 otoliths. | An eel. | |
| Apateodus | A. crenellatus? | Cabot, Arkansas. | 3 otoliths. | An aulopiform. | |
| Arius | A.? subtilis | Cabot, Arkansas. | A well-preserved otolith (DMNH 2021-09-11). | A catfish. | |
| Clupeiformes? indeterminate | Indeterminate | Cabot, Arkansas. | An eroded, broken otolith (DMNH 2021-09-10). | A clupeiform. | |
| Echiophis | E. aff. E. semisphaeroides | Cabot, Arkansas. | 11 otoliths. | An eel. | |
| Elopothrissus | E. sp. | Cabot, Arkansas. | One otolith (DMNH 2021-09-03). | A bonefish. | |
| Elops | E. sp. | Cabot, Arkansas. | A small, broken otolith (DMNH 2021-09-01). | A ladyfish. | |
| Eutawichthys | E. maastrichtiensis | Cabot, Arkansas. | 21 otoliths. | A beryciform. | |
| Eutawichthys | E. cf. E. stringeri | Cabot, Arkansas. | 48 otoliths. | A beryciform. | |
| Eutawichthys | E. zideki | Cabot, Arkansas. | 287 otoliths. | A beryciform. | |
| Gadiformes indeterminate | Indeterminate | Cabot, Arkansas. | 11 very small or broken otoliths. | A gadiform. | |
| Genartina | G. sp. 1 | Cabot, Arkansas. | One otolith (DMNH 2021-09-04). | | |
| Kokenichthys | K. navis | Cabot, Arkansas. | 2 eroded otoliths. | An osteoglossiform. | |
| Lapillus type 1 | Indeterminate | Cabot, Arkansas. | A small, slightly eroded otolith (DMNH 2021-09-31). | An unidentified fish otolith. | |
| Muraenanguilla | M.? sp. | Cabot, Arkansas. | 2 worn, broken otoliths. | An eel. | |
| Osmeroides | O. sp. | Cabot, Arkansas. | 3 otoliths. | | |
| Palaeogadus | P.? belli | Cabot, Arkansas. | Multiple otoliths. | A gadiform. | |
| Palaeogadus | P. cf. P. weltoni | Cabot, Arkansas. | A small, slightly eroded otolith (DMNH 2021-09-23). | A gadiform. | |
| Protobythites | P. brzobohatyi | Cabot, Arkansas. | 4 otoliths. | An ophidiiform. | |
| Tippaha | T. mythica | Cabot, Arkansas. | 8 otoliths. | A holocentriform. | |
| Vorishia | V. vulpes | Cabot, Arkansas. | 1,537 otoliths. | A catfish. | |

=== Rays ===
Rays reported from the Arkadelphia Formation
| Genus | Species | Presence | Material | Notes | Images |
|---|---|---|---|---|---|
| Dasyatis | D. sp. | Ouachita River northwest of Malvern, Arkansas. | 3 oral teeth (AMNH 20194-20196) | A stingray. | |
| Ischyrhiza | I. avonicola | Ouachita River northwest of Malvern, Arkansas. | 8 teeth (AMNH 20164-20171). | A sawskate. | |
| Ischyrhiza | I. mira | Ouachita River northwest of Malvern, Arkansas. | 3 oral teeth (AMNH 20172-20174). | A sawskate. | |
| Ptychotrygon | P. cf. P. vermiculata | Ouachita River northwest of Malvern, Arkansas. | 4 oral teeth (AMNH 20183-20186). | A sawskate. | |
| Raja | R. farishi | Ouachita River northwest of Malvern, Arkansas. | 3 oral teeth (AMNH 20187-20189). | A skate. | |
| Rhinobatos | R. casieri | Ouachita River northwest of Malvern, Arkansas. | 4 oral teeth (AMNH 20160-20163). | A guitarfish. | |
| Rhombodus | R. binkhorsti | Ouachita River northwest of Malvern, Arkansas. | 4 oral teeth (AMNH 20190-20193) | A rajiforme. | |
| Schizorhiza | S. cf. S. stromeri | Ouachita River northwest of Malvern, Arkansas. | 5 rostral teeth (AMNH 20178-20182). | A sawskate. | |
| Sclerorhynchus | S. sp. | Ouachita River northwest of Malvern, Arkansas. | 3 rostral teeth (AMNH 20175-20177). | A sawskate. | |

=== Sharks ===
Sharks reported from the Arkadelphia Formation
| Genus | Species | Presence | Material | Notes | Images |
|---|---|---|---|---|---|
| Carcharias | C. cf. C. holmdelensis | Ouachita River northwest of Malvern, Arkansas. | 5 anterior teeth (AMNH 20139-20143). | A sand shark. | |
| Galeorhinus | G. girardoti | Ouachita River northwest of Malvern, Arkansas. | 4 lateral teeth (AMNH 20156-20159). | A houndshark. | |
| Ginglymostoma | G. lehneri | Ouachita River northwest of Malvern, Arkansas. | 4 lateral teeth (AMNH 20132-20135). | A carpet shark. | |
| Odontaspis | O. aculeatus | Ouachita River northwest of Malvern, Arkansas. | 2 lateral teeth (AMNH 20137 & 20138). | A sand shark. | |
| Plicatoscyllium | P. cf. P. derameei | Ouachita River northwest of Malvern, Arkansas. | Lateroanterior tooth (AMNH 20136). | A carpet shark. | |
| Serratolamna | S. serrata | Ouachita River northwest of Malvern, Arkansas. | 6 teeth (AMNH 20144-20149). | A mackerel shark. | |
| Squalicorax | S. kaupi | Ouachita River northwest of Malvern, Arkansas. | 6 lateral teeth (AMNH 20150-10155). | A mackerel shark. | |
| Squatina | S. hassei | Ouachita River northwest of Malvern, Arkansas. | 4 lateral teeth (AMNH 20128-20131). | An angelshark. | |

== See also ==
- List of fossiliferous stratigraphic units in Arkansas
- Paleontology in Arkansas
