= Batesville Sandstone =

Geologic formation in northern Arkansas

- Stratigraphic range: Mississippian
- Type: Formation
- Sub-units: Hindsville Limestone Member
- Underlies: Fayetteville Shale
- Overlies: Ruddell Shale, Moorefield Formation

Lithology
- Primary: Sandstone
- Other: Limestone

Location
- Region: Arkansas
- Country: United States

Type section
- Named for: Batesville, Independence County, Arkansas
- Named by: John Casper Branner

The Batesville Sandstone is a geologic formation in northern Arkansas, United States, that dates to the Chesterian Series of the late Mississippian. The base of the Batesville Sandstone, named the Hindsville Limestone Member, unconformably lies on the Moorefield Formation.

== Paleofauna ==
=== Brachiopods ===
- Orthotetes

O. batesvillensis

=== Bryozoans ===
- Archimedes

A. proutanus

- Batostomella

B. parvula

- Glyptopora

G. michelinia

- Leioclema
- Polypora
- Tabulipora

T. miseri

=== Cephalopods ===
- Goniatites

G. choctawensis
G. granosus

- Lusitanites

L. subcircularis

- Neoglyphioceras

N. caneyanum

== See also ==
- List of fossiliferous stratigraphic units in Arkansas
- Paleontology in Arkansas
