= Polk Creek Shale =

- Stratigraphic range: Ordovician
- Type: Formation
- Unit of: none
- Sub-units: none
- Underlies: Blaylock Sandstone
- Overlies: Bigfork Chert
- Thickness: 50 to 225 feet

Lithology
- Primary: Shale

Location
- Region: Arkansas, Oklahoma
- Country: United States

Type section
- Named for: Polk Creek, Montgomery County, Arkansas
- Named by: Albert Homer Purdue

The Polk Creek Shale is a Late Ordovician geologic formation in the Ouachita Mountains of Arkansas and Oklahoma. First described in 1892, this unit was not named until 1909 by Albert Homer Purdue in his study of the Ouachita Mountains of Arkansas. Purdue assigned Polk Creek in Montgomery County, Arkansas as the type locality, but did not designate a stratotype. As of 2017, a reference section for this unit has yet to be designated.

== Paleofauna ==
=== Graptolites ===
- Amplexograptus
- Climacograptus

C. mississippiensis
C. putillus
C. tridentatus var. maximus
C. ulrichi

- Dicellograptus

D. anceps
D. complanatus
D. elegans
D. forehammeri flexuosus

- Diplograptus

D. calcaratus
D. calcaratus var. trifidus
D. crassitestus

- Glossograptus

G. quadrimucronatus
G. quadrimucronatus var. paucithecatus

- Lasiograptus
- Mesograptus
- Nymphograptus

N. velatus

- Orthograptus

O. quadrimucronatus
O. spinigerus

== See also ==
- List of fossiliferous stratigraphic units in Arkansas
- Paleontology in Arkansas
