= Winslow Formation =

Geologic formation in Arkansas, United States

- Stratigraphic range: Carboniferous: Pennsylvanian
- Type: Formation

Location
- Region: Arkansas
- Country: United States

Type section
- Named for: Winslow, Washington County, Arkansas
- Named by: George Irving Adams and Edward Oscar Ulrich

The Winslow Formation was a geologic formation in Arkansas, now abandoned and replaced by the Atoka Formation, the Hartshorne Formation, and the lower McAlester Formation (previously Spadra Shale). It preserves fossils dating back to the Carboniferous period.

== See also ==
- List of fossiliferous stratigraphic units in Arkansas
- Paleontology in Arkansas
