= Missouri Mountain Shale =

Geologic formation in Arkansas and Oklahoma, United States

- Stratigraphic range: Silurian
- Type: Formation
- Unit of: none
- Sub-units: none
- Underlies: Arkansas Novaculite
- Overlies: Blaylock Sandstone
- Thickness: up to 300 feet

Lithology
- Primary: Shale

Location
- Region: Arkansas, Oklahoma
- Country: United States

Type section
- Named for: Missouri Mountains, Polk County and Montgomery County, Arkansas
- Named by: Albert Homer Purdue

The Missouri Mountain Shale is a Silurian geologic formation in the Ouachita Mountains of Arkansas and Oklahoma in the United States. First described in 1892, this unit was not named until 1909 by Albert Homer Purdue in his study of the Ouachita Mountains of Arkansas. Purdue assigned the Missouri Mountains in Polk and Montgomery counties, Arkansas as the type locality, but did not designate a stratotype. As of 2017, a reference section for this unit has yet to be designated.

== See also ==
- List of fossiliferous stratigraphic units in Arkansas
- Paleontology in Arkansas
