= Blaylock Sandstone =

- Stratigraphic range: Silurian
- Type: Formation
- Unit of: none
- Sub-units: none
- Underlies: Missouri Mountain Shale
- Overlies: Polk Creek Shale
- Thickness: up to 1200 feet

Lithology
- Primary: Sandstone

Location
- Region: Arkansas, Oklahoma
- Country: United States

Type section
- Named for: Blaylock Mountain, Montgomery County, Arkansas
- Named by: Albert Homer Purdue

The Blaylock Sandstone is a Silurian geologic formation in the Ouachita Mountains of Arkansas and Oklahoma. First described in 1892, this unit was not named until 1909 by Albert Homer Purdue in his study of the Ouachita Mountains of Arkansas. Purdue assigned the Blaylock Mountain in Montgomery County, Arkansas as the type locality, but did not designate a stratotype. As of 2017, a reference section for this unit has yet to be designated.

== Paleofauna ==
=== Graptolites ===
- Dictyonema
- Dimorphograptus

D. decussatus

- Gladiograptus

G. perlatus

- Monograptus

M. argutus
M. distans
M. gregarius

== See also ==
- List of fossiliferous stratigraphic units in Arkansas
- Paleontology in Arkansas
