= Smithville Formation =

Geologic formation in Arkansas, United States

- Stratigraphic range: Ordovician
- Type: Formation
- Sub-units: Black Rock Limestone Member
- Underlies: Everton Formation
- Overlies: Powell Formation

Lithology
- Primary: dolomite

Location
- Region: Arkansas
- Country: United States

Type section
- Named for: Smithville, Lawrence County, Arkansas
- Named by: Edward Oscar Ulrich

The Smithville Formation or Smithville Dolomite is a geologic formation in Arkansas. It preserves fossils dating back to the Ordovician period.

== See also ==
- List of fossiliferous stratigraphic units in Arkansas
- Paleontology in Arkansas
