= Dierks Limestone =

- Stratigraphic range: Aptian; ~120–112 Ma
- Type: Formation
- Unit of: Trinity Group

Location
- Region: Arkansas
- Country: United States

Type section
- Named for: Dierks, Howard County, Arkansas
- Named by: Hugh Dismore Miser and Albert Homer Purdue

The Dierks Limestone is a geologic formation in Arkansas. It preserves fossils dating back to the Cretaceous period.

== See also ==
- List of fossiliferous stratigraphic units in Arkansas
- Paleontology in Arkansas
