= Ozan Formation =

Geological formation in the United States

- Stratigraphic range: Cretaceous
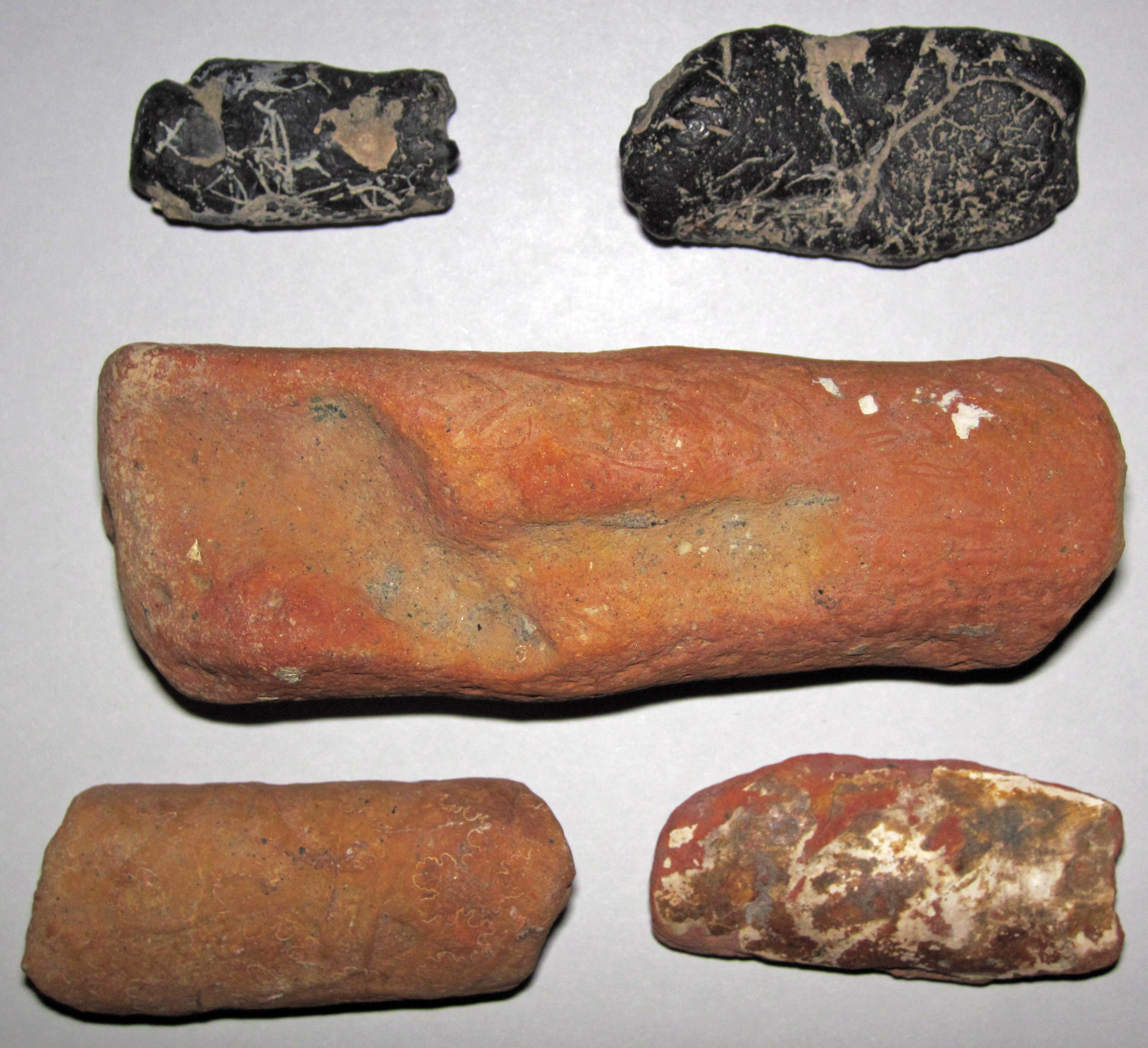
- Fossil ammonites from the Ozan Formation
- Type: Formation
- Sub-units: Austin Group
- Underlies: Annona Chalk
- Overlies: Austin Chalk, Brownstown Marl
- Thickness: 150 to 250 feet

Location
- Region: Arkansas, Oklahoma
- Country: United States

Type section
- Named by: C.H. Dane

The Ozan Formation is a geologic formation in Arkansas, Oklahoma and Texas. It preserves fossils dating back to the Cretaceous period.

== Paleofauna ==
=== Ostracods ===
- Alatacythere

A. ponderosana

- Amphicytherura

A. dubia

- Bairdoppilata

B. rotunda

- Brachycythere

B. ledaforma
B. rhomboidalis
B. sphenoides

- Bythocypris

B. windhami

- Clithrocytheridea

C. fabaformis

- Cythereis

C. bicornis
C. caudata
C. communis
C. costatana
C. dallasensis
C. hannai
C. paraustinensis
C. plummeri
C. spoori
C. verricula

- Cytherella

C. austinensis

- Cytherelloidea

C. crafti
C. ozanana
C. spiralia
C. tollettensis

- Cytheropteron

C. blakei

- Haplocytheridea

H. bruceclarki
H. councilli
H. globosa
H. insolita
H. micropunctata
H. plummeri

- Krithe

K. cushmani
K. postprojecta

- Loxoconcha

L. fletcheri

- Monoceratina

M. montuosa
M. pedata
M. prothroensis

- Orthonotacythere

O. hannai

- Phacorhabdotus

P. texanus

- Pterygocythere

P. saratogana

- Veenia

V. arachoides
V. gapensis
V. ozanana

- Velarocythere

V. reesidei

=== Avians ===
- Hesperornis

=== Reptiles ===
- Globidens

== Outcrops ==
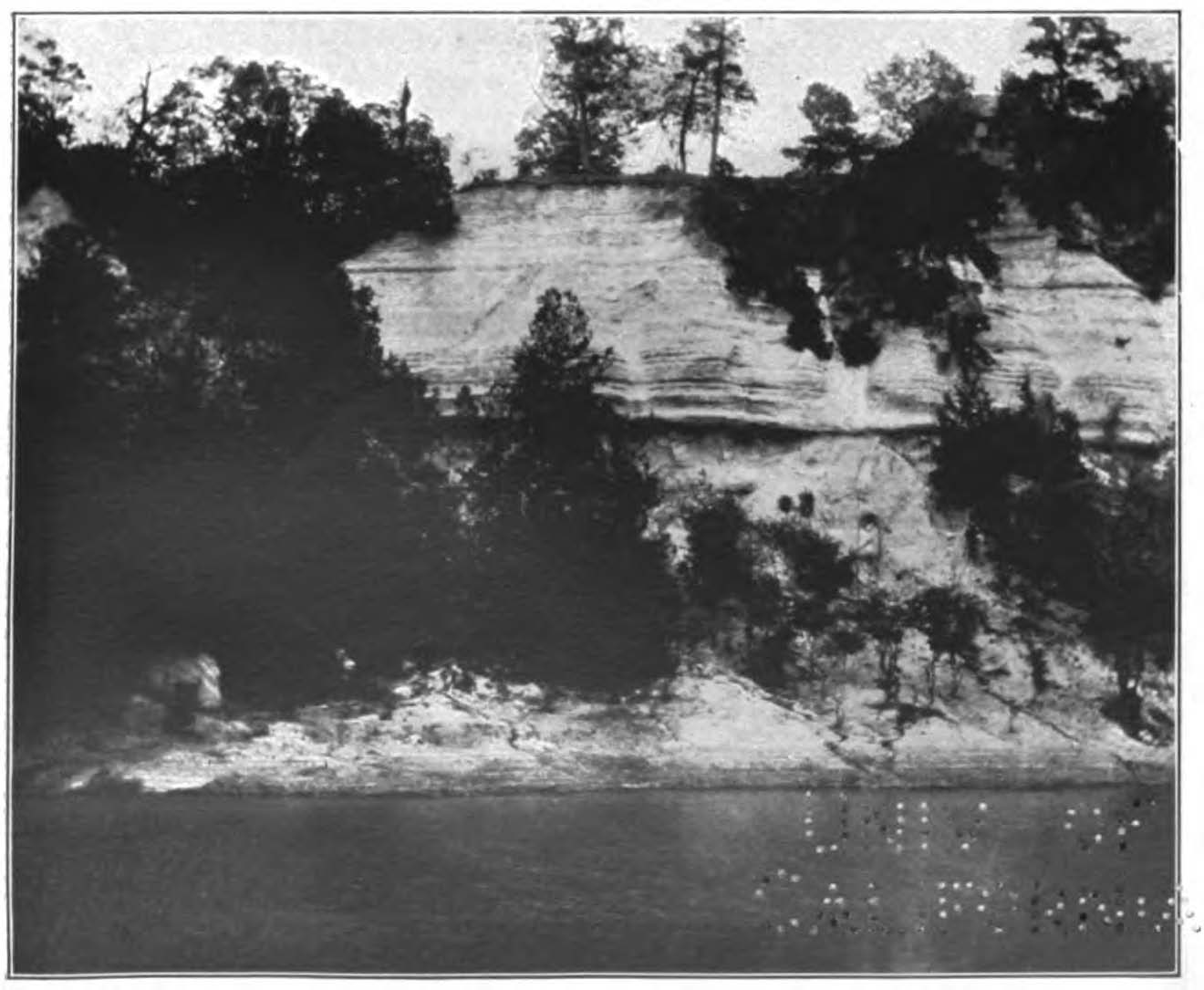
Annona Chalk overlying Ozan Formation at what is now called White Cliffs Natural Area, with the Little River in the foreground, Howard County, AR (c. 1910)

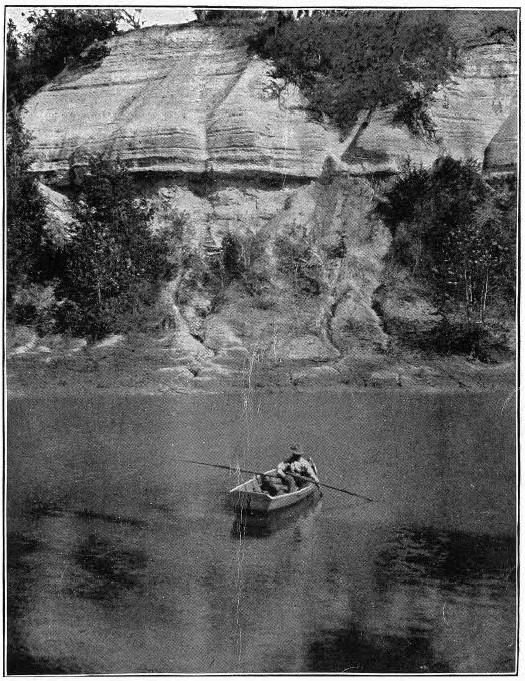
Another view of the same location (c. 1902)

== See also ==
- List of fossiliferous stratigraphic units in Arkansas
- Paleontology in Arkansas
