= Saratoga Chalk =

- Stratigraphic range: Cretaceous
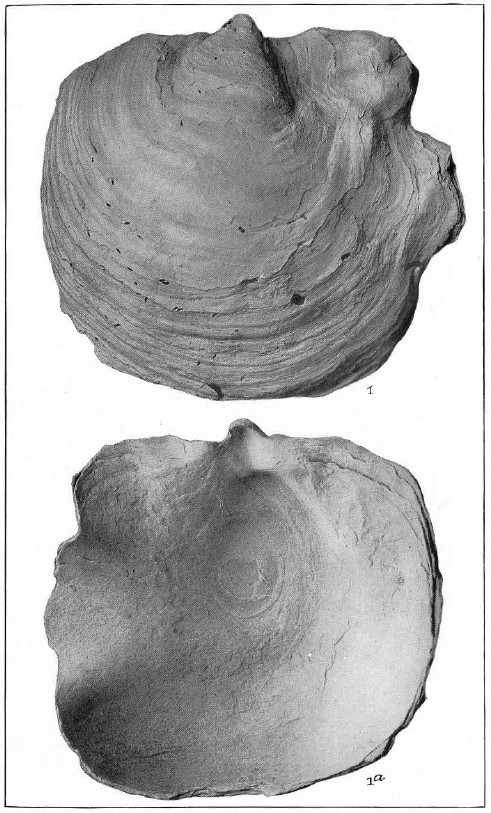
- Fossils from the Saratoga Chalk
- Type: Formation
- Underlies: Nacatoch Formation
- Overlies: Marlbrook Formation
- Thickness: 20 to 70 feet

Location
- Region: Arkansas
- Country: United States

Type section
- Named by: John Casper Branner

The Saratoga Chalk is a geologic formation in Arkansas. It preserves fossils dating back to the Cretaceous period, specifically ammonites.

== Paleofauna ==
=== Ammonites ===
- Baculites

B. ovatus
B. undatus

- Didymoceras

D. navarroense

- Gaudryceras
- Hoploscaphites

H. pumilis

- Jeletzkytes

J. nodosus

- Lewyites

L. oronensis

- Nostoceras

N. approximans
N. colubriformis
N. draconis
N. helicinum
N. hyatti
N. pauper

- Pachydiscus

P. arkansanus

- Pseudokossmaticeras

P. galicianum

- Solenoceras

== See also ==
- List of fossiliferous stratigraphic units in Arkansas
- Paleontology in Arkansas
