= Annona Chalk =

Geological formation in the United States

- Stratigraphic range: Cretaceous
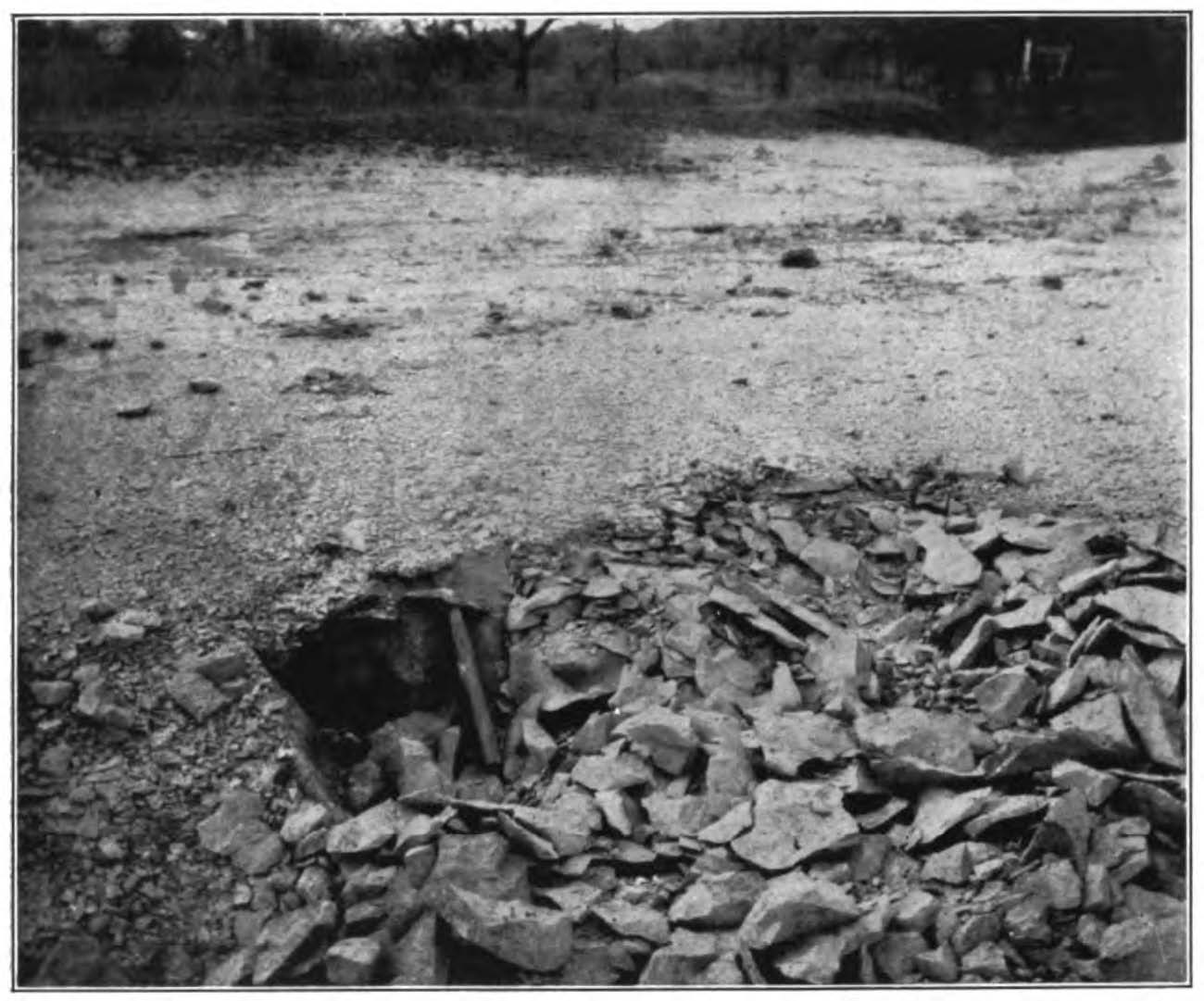
- Outcrop east of Clarksville, TX (c. 1910)
- Type: Sedimentary
- Sub-units: Austin Group
- Underlies: Marlbrook Marl
- Overlies: Ozan Formation
- Thickness: 30 Meters

Lithology
- Primary: Chalk

Location
- Region: Arkansas
- Country: United States

Type section
- Named for: Annona, Red River County, Texas
- Named by: Robert Thomas Hill

The Annona Chalk is a geologic formation in Arkansas, Texas, Louisiana, and Oklahoma. It preserves fossils dating back to the Cretaceous period. The formation is a hard, thick-bedded to massive, slightly fossiliferous chalk. It weathers white, but is blue-gray when freshly exposed. The unit is commercially mined for cement. Fossils in the Annona Chalk include coelenterates, echinoderms, annelids, bivalves, gastropods, cephalopods, and some vertebrate traces. The beds range in thickness, up to over 100 feet in depth in some areas (such as at White Cliffs)., but thins to the east and is only a few feet thick north of Columbus, Arkansas and is completely missing to the east. The break between the Annona Formation and the Ozan Formation appears to be sharp with a few tubular borings up to a foot long extending down from the Annona in to the Ozan.

== Exposures ==
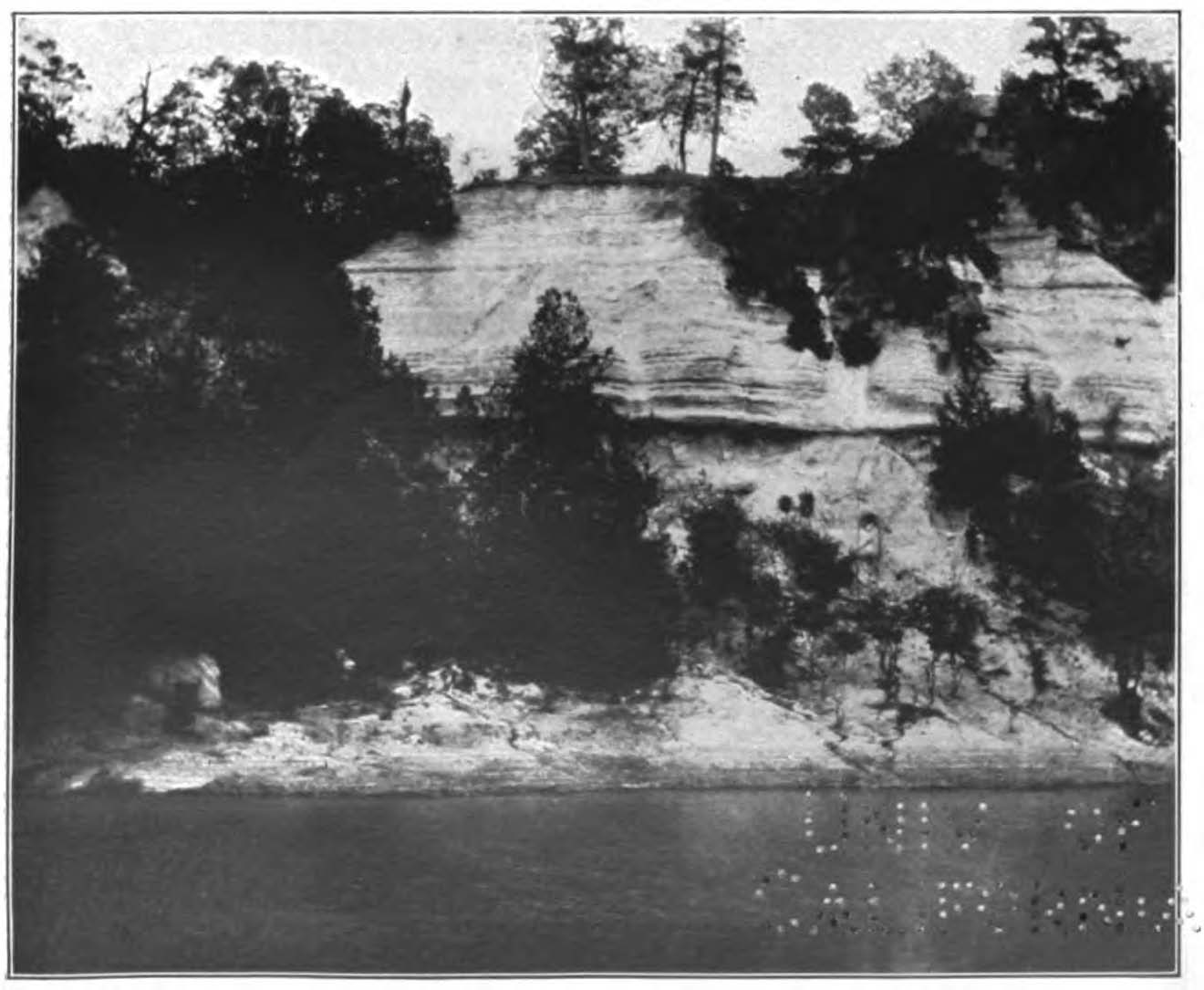
Annona Chalk overlying Ozan Formation at what is now called White Cliffs Natural Area, with the Little River in the foreground, Howard County, AR (c. 1910)

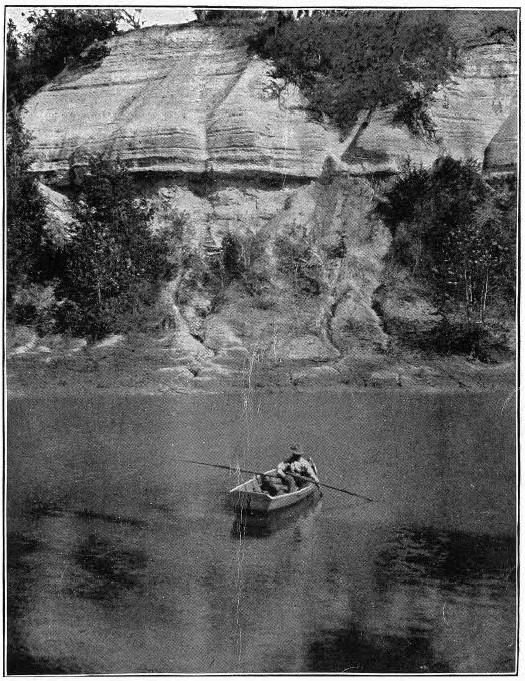
Another view of the same location (c. 1902)

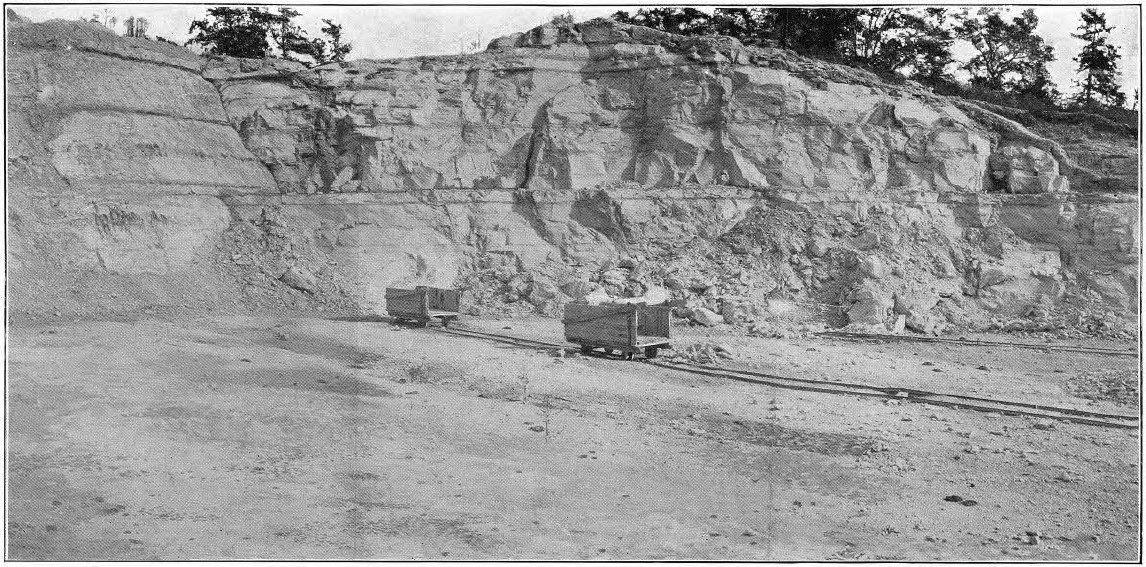
Quarry at Whitecliffs Landing (c. 1902)

== Paleofauna ==
=== Ammonites ===
- Baculites

B. crickmayi
B. taylorensis

- Didymoceras
- Didymoceratoides

D. binodosum
D. clardyi

- Nostoceras

N. (Nostoceras) danei
N. (Nostoceras) monotuberculatum
N. (Nostoceras) plerucostatum
N. (Nostoceras) pulcher

- Oxybeloceras

O. crassum

- Pachydiscus
- Placenticeras

=== Ostracods ===
- Alatacythere

A. ponderosana

- Bairdoppilata

B. rotunda

- Brachycythere

B. ovata

- Bythocypris

B. windhami

- Cythere
- Cythereis

C. austinensis
C. caudata
C. communis
C. filicosta
C. paraustinensis

- Cytherelloidea

C. crafti
C. tollettensis

- Cytheropteron

C. blakei

- Haplocytheridea

H. bruceclarki
H. globosa
H. micropunctata
H. plummeri

- Krithe

K. cushmani

- Loxoconcha

L. fletcheri

- Monoceratina

M. montuosa
M. pedata

- Orthonotacythere

O. hannai

- Paracypris
- Phacorhabdotus

P. texanus

- Veenia

V. ozanana

== See also ==
- List of fossiliferous stratigraphic units in Arkansas
- Paleontology in Arkansas
