= Nacatoch Formation =

Geological formation in Arkansas

- Stratigraphic range: Late Cretaceous
- Type: Formation
- Underlies: Arkadelphia Marl
- Overlies: Saratoga Formation
- Thickness: 150 to 400 feet

Location
- Region: Arkansas
- Country: United States

Type section
- Named for: Nacatoch Bluff on the Little Missouri River, Clark County, Arkansas
- Named by: Albert Homer Purdue

The Nacatoch Formation is a geologic formation in Arkansas, USA. It preserves fossils dating back to the Cretaceous period.

== See also ==
- List of fossiliferous stratigraphic units in Arkansas
- Paleontology in Arkansas
