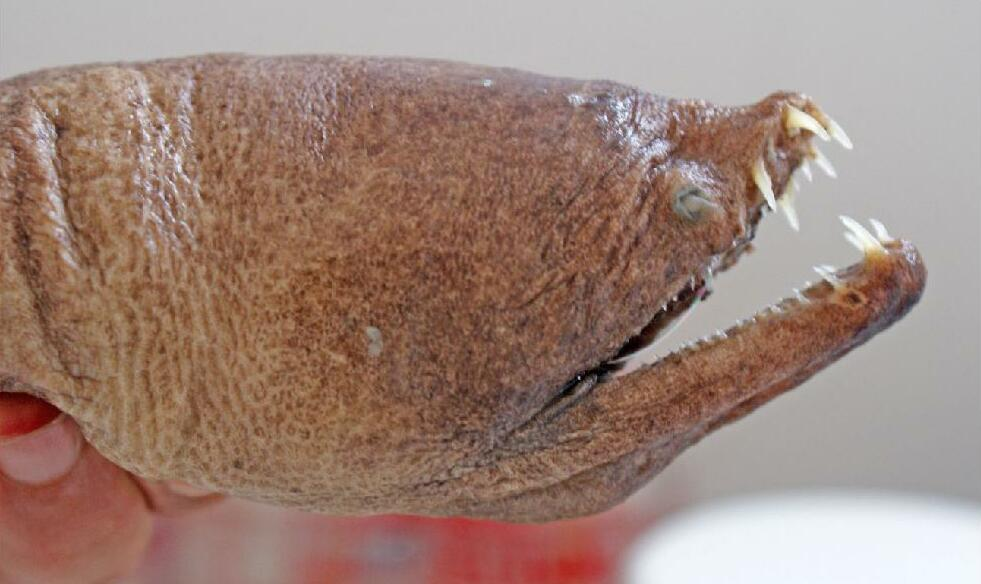

Scientific classification
- Kingdom: Animalia
- Phylum: Chordata
- Class: Actinopterygii
- Order: Anguilliformes
- Family: Ophichthidae
- Genus: Aplatophis
- Species: A. chauliodus

Binomial name
- Aplatophis chauliodus Böhlke, 1956

= Aplatophis chauliodus =

Species of fish

Aplatophis chauliodus, the fangtooth snake-eel, also known as the tusky eel in Cuba and the United States, is an eel in the family Ophichthidae. It was described by James Erwin Böhlke in 1956. It is a marine, tropical eel known from the western Atlantic Ocean, including the Gulf of Mexico and French Guiana. It is also known to occur on the northeastern coast of Brasil. It dwells at a depth range of 33–91 m (100–300 ft), and dwells in both marine waters and brackish estuaries. It inhabits burrows on a permanent or semipermanent basis, and leaves its eyes and snout exposed. Males can reach a maximum total length of 84 cm (33 in). The fangtooth snake-eel's diet consists of bony fish and crustaceans.

== Texas sea monster ==
The Texas sea monster, also referred as fanged monster or fanged creature, was an animal carcass that washed ashore on a beach near Texas City, Texas in September 2017. The identity of the creature and the veracity of stories surrounding it have been the subject of controversy and speculation. The corpse was eventually decided by experts to be that of a giant-eel or snake-eel, probably A. chauliodus, although another species of snake-eel, Echiophis punctifer, was suggested by local fishermen. It was photographed and shared on Twitter by Preeti Desai, a science communicator with the Audubon Society. Netizens claimed it to be a "sea-monster".
