= Pentremital Limestone Group =

- Stratigraphic range: Carboniferous
- Type: Group

Location
- Region: Arkansas
- Country: United States

The Pentremital Limestone Group is a geologic group in Arkansas. It preserves fossils dating back to the Carboniferous period.

== See also ==
- List of fossiliferous stratigraphic units in Arkansas
- Paleontology in Arkansas
