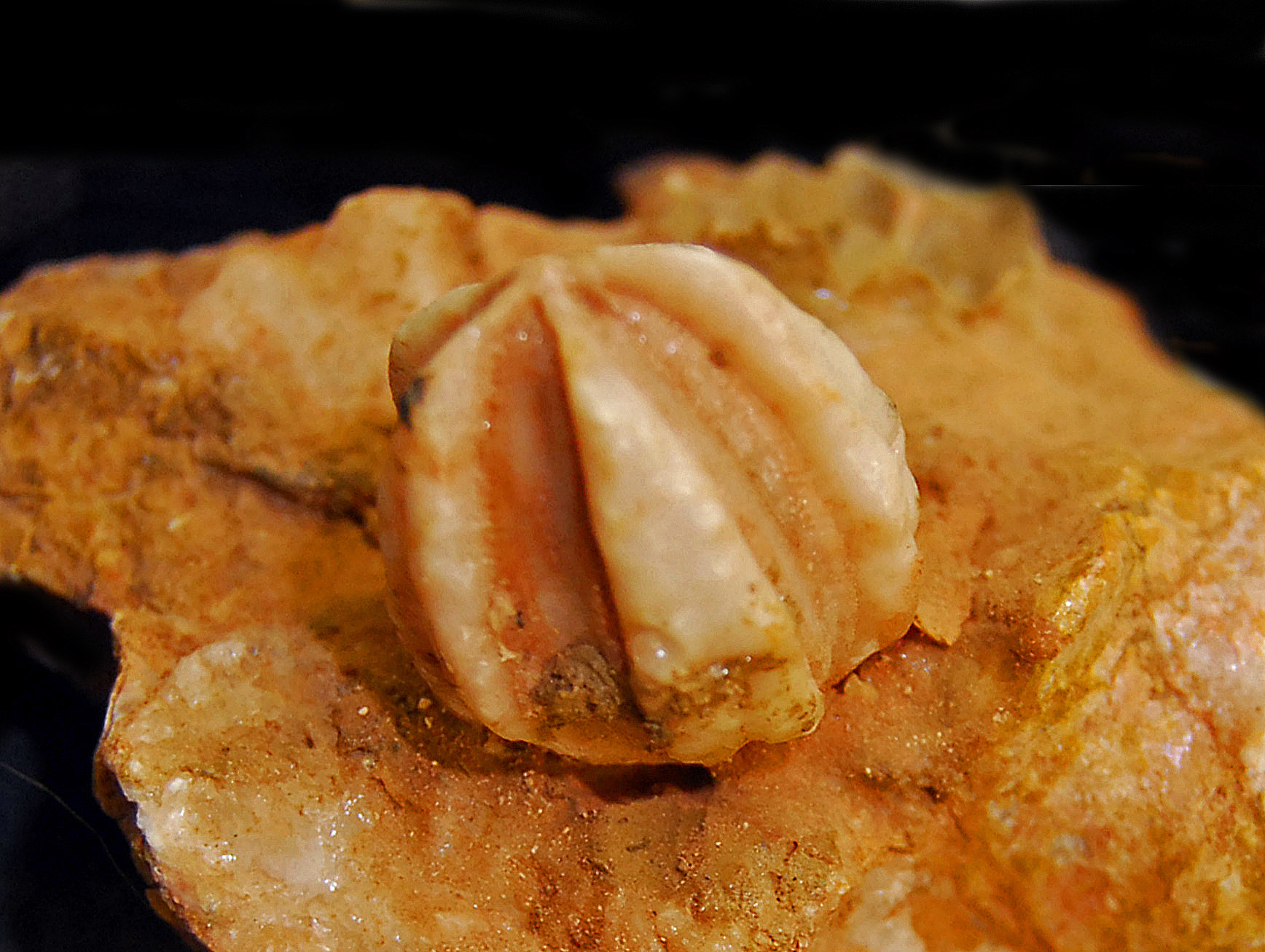
- Fossil of Deltoblastus timorensis

Scientific classification
- Kingdom: Animalia
- Phylum: Echinodermata
- Class: †Blastoidea
- Order: †Spiraculata
- Family: †Schizoblastidae
- Genus: †Deltoblastus; Fay, 1961

= Deltoblastus =

Deltoblastus Temporal range: Permian

Extinct genus of marine invertebrates

Deltoblastus is a genus of blastoid echinoderms that lived in the Permian. Its fossils are known from Asia.
