= Marlbrook Marl =

Geologic formation in Arkansas, United States

- Stratigraphic range: Cretaceous
- Type: Formation
- Underlies: Saratoga Formation
- Overlies: Annona Chalk
- Thickness: 50 to 220 feet

Location
- Region: Arkansas
- Country: United States

Type section
- Named by: Robert Thomas Hill

The Marlbrook Marl is a geologic formation in Arkansas. It preserves fossils dating back to the Late Cretaceous period.

== Paleofauna ==
=== Ostracods ===
- Alatacythere
  - A. pondersana
- Amphicytherura
  - A. dubia
- Bairdia
- Bairdoppilata
  - B. pondera
- Brachycythere
  - B. ledaforma
  - B. ovata
  - B. rhomboidalis
- Bythocypris
  - B. windhami
- Clithrocytheridea
  - C. fabaformis
- Cythereis
  - C. costatana
  - C. hannai
- Cytherella
  - C. coryelli
  - C. navarroensis
  - C. scotti
- Cytherelloidea
  - C. austinensis
  - C. crafti
  - C. greenensis
  - C. spiralia
  - C. tollettensis
- Cythereis
  - C. communis
  - C. costatana
  - C. filicosta
  - C. pidgeoni
  - C. tuberculifera
  - C. verricula
- Cytheropteron
  - C. blakei
  - C. castorensis
  - C. harrisi
- Echinocythereis
  - E. bartoni
- Haplocytheridea
  - H. bruceclarki
  - H. councilli
  - H. fabaformis
  - H. globosa
  - H. micropunctata
  - H. monmouthensis
  - H. plummeri
- Krithe
  - K. cushmani
  - K. swaini
- Loxoconcha
  - L. fletcheri
- Monoceratina
  - M. marssonitina
  - M. montuosa
  - M. pedata
  - M. prothroensis
- Morrowina
- Neocythere
  - N. (Neocythere) pseudoconcentrica
- Orthonotacythere
  - O. (Orthonotacythere) hannai
  - O. (Orthonotacythere) polita
- Paracypris
  - P. angusta
  - P. goodlandensis
- Pterygocythere
  - P. saratogana
- Trachyleberis
  - T. communis
  - T. pideoni
- Veenia
  - V. arachoides
  - V. ozanana
- Xestoleberis
  - X. opina

=== Avians ===
- Hesperornis

== See also ==
- List of fossiliferous stratigraphic units in Arkansas
- Paleontology in Arkansas
