= Moorefield Formation =

Geologic formation in northern Arkansas and eastern Oklahoma

- Stratigraphic range: Mississippian
- Type: Formation
- Sub-units: Ruddell Shale
- Underlies: Batesville Formation
- Overlies: Boone Formation
- Thickness: up to 300 feet

Lithology
- Primary: Shale
- Other: Limestone

Location
- Region: Arkansas, Oklahoma
- Country: United States

Type section
- Named for: Moorefield, Independence County, Arkansas
- Named by: George Irving Adams and Edward Oscar Ulrich

The Moorefield Formation, or Moorefield Shale, is a geologic formation in northern Arkansas and eastern Oklahoma that dates to the Meramecian Series of the middle Mississippian. In Arkansas, this formation is generally recognized to have one member, the Ruddell Shale, in the upper Moorefield Formation.

== Paleofauna ==
=== Bryozoans ===
- Archimedes

A. confertus
A. proutanus

- Batostomella

B. dubla
B. parvula

- Tabulipora

=== Cephalopods ===
- Adnatoceras

A. alaskense

- Bactrites

B. caronarius
B. smithianus

- Endolobus

E. ornatus

- Girtyoceras

G. welleri

- Goniaties
- Mitorthoceras

== See also ==
- List of fossiliferous stratigraphic units in Arkansas
- Paleontology in Arkansas
