= Cryptoblastus =

Cryptoblastus Temporal range: Mississippian

Scientific classification
- Domain: Eukaryota
- Kingdom: Animalia
- Phylum: Echinodermata
- Class: †Blastoidea
- Order: †Spiraculata
- Genus: †Cryptoblastus; Etherridge, Jr. & Carpender, 1886

Extinct genus of marine invertebrates

Cryptoblastus is a genus of extinct blastoids, a primitive group of echinoderms related to the modern sea lilies. Fossils are found in sedimentary rocks laid down in the Early Carboniferous period some 360 to 320 million years ago.
