= Brooding anemone =

Scientific classification
- Kingdom: Animalia
- Phylum: Cnidaria
- Subphylum: Anthozoa
- Class: Hexacorallia
- Order: Actiniaria
- Family: Halcampidae
- Genus: Halianthella
- Species: H. annularis

Binomial name
- Halianthella annularis Carlgren, 1938

Species of sea anemone

The brooding anemone, Halianthella annularis, is a species of sea anemone in the family Halcampidae.

== Description ==
The brooding anemone is a pale, fragile-looking anemone, having 24 long, transparent tentacles.

== Distribution ==
It is found only around the South African coast, from Lamberts Bay to Cape Agulhas.

== Ecology ==
This anemone is found subtidally down to at least 20m under water. It favours sheltered areas and overhangs.

Juveniles are brooded in a fold of the skin on the column of the parent.
