= Echiophis =

Scientific classification
- Kingdom: Animalia
- Phylum: Chordata
- Class: Actinopterygii
- Order: Anguilliformes
- Family: Ophichthidae
- Subfamily: Ophichthinae
- Genus: Echiophis; Kaup, 1856

Type species
- Ophisurus intertinctus Richardson, 1848

Species
- See text.

Synonyms
- Crotalopsis Kaup, 1859; Macrodonophis Poey, 1868; Notophtophis Castro-Aguirre & Suárez de los Cobos, 1983

Genus of fishes

Echiophis is a genus of eels in the snake eel family Ophichthidae. It currently contains the following species:

- Echiophis brunneus (Castro-Aguirre & Suárez de los Cobos, 1983) (Pacific spoon-nose eel)
- Echiophis intertinctus (J. Richardson, 1848) (Spotted spoon-nose eel)
- Echiophis punctifer (Kaup, 1860) (Stippled spoon-nose eel)
