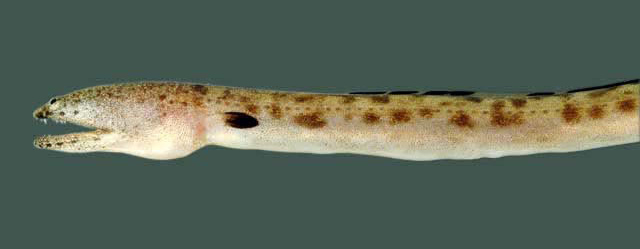

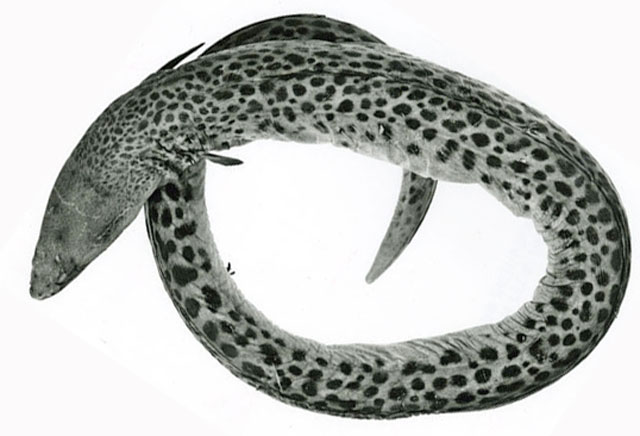

Conservation status
- Least Concern (IUCN 3.1)

Scientific classification
- Kingdom: Animalia
- Phylum: Chordata
- Class: Actinopterygii
- Order: Anguilliformes
- Family: Ophichthidae
- Genus: Echiophis
- Species: E. intertinctus

Binomial name
- Echiophis intertinctus (Richardson, 1848)
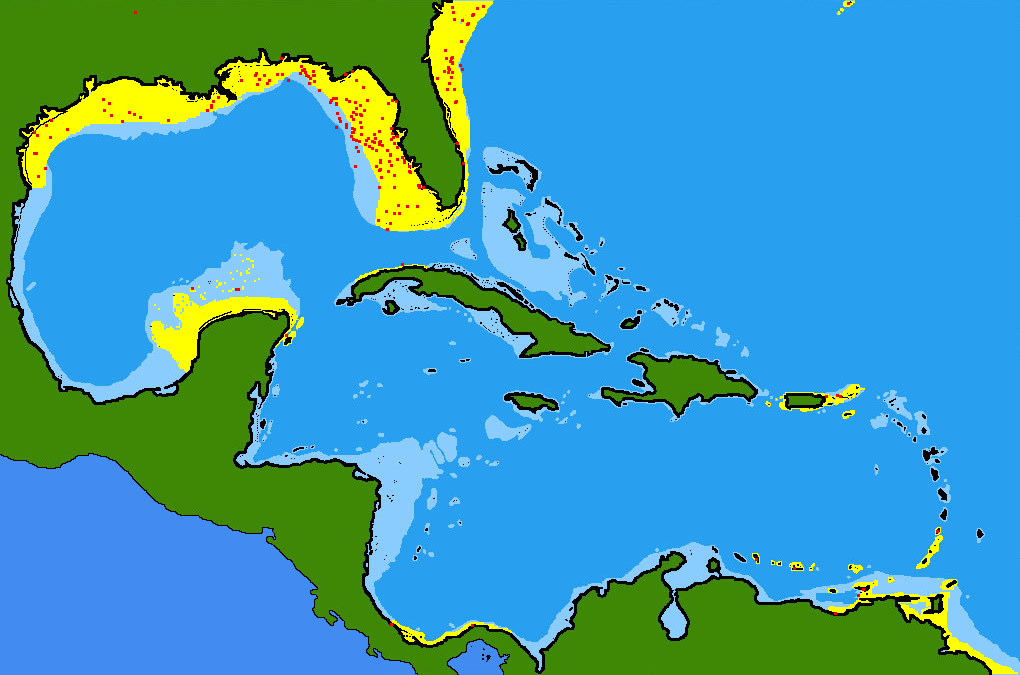

Synonyms
- Ophisurus intertinctus Richardson, 1848; Mystriophis interstinctus (Richardson, 1848); Leptocephalus caudomaculatus Eigenmann & Kennedy, 1902

= Spotted spoon-nose eel =

Species of fish

The spotted spoon-nose eel (Echiophis intertinctus) is an eel in the family Ophichthidae (worm/snake eels). It was described by John Richardson in 1848. It is a marine, tropical eel which is known from the western Atlantic Ocean, including North Carolina, USA, the northern Gulf of Mexico, and Brazil. It is known to dwell at a depth of 100 m (330 ft), and inhabits soft benthic sediments. Males can reach a maximum total length of 180 cm (5 ft 11 in), but more commonly reach a TL of 150 cm (4 ft 11 in).
