= Atoka Formation =

Geologic formation in the United States

- Stratigraphic range: Pennsylvanian
- Type: Geologic formation
- Underlies: Hartshorne Sandstone
- Overlies: Bloyd Formation, Johns Valley Formation

Lithology
- Primary: Sandstone
- Other: Shale

Location
- Region: Arkansas, Oklahoma
- Country: United States

Type section
- Named by: J.A. Taff

Named after Atoka County, Oklahoma, the Atoka Formation is a geologic formation in central and western Arkansas, eastern Oklahoma, central and western Texas, and eastern New Mexico. It is the surface rock of the Boston Mountains and dominates exposures in the Frontal Ouachita Mountains of the Arkansas River Valley.

== Sedimentology ==
The Atoka Formation is a sequence of marine sandstones, siltstones, and shales, and may be as thick at 25,000 feet in the Ouachita Mountains. The formation is conformable with the Bloyd Shale in the Boston Mountains and the Johns Valley Formation in the Ouachita Mountains.

== Paleofauna ==
=== Conodonts ===
- Cavusgnathus

C. lauta
C. sinuata

- Gnathodus

G. wapanuckensis

- Gondolella

G. bella

- Hindeodella
- Ligonodina

L. lexingtonensis

- Ozarkodina

O. recta

- Polygnathodella

P. attenuata
P. ouachitensis

- Streptognathodus

S. cancellosus
S. gracilis

=== Foraminifera ===
- Fusulinella

F. devexa
F. oliviformis
F. prolifica

- Hyperammina

H. bulbosa

- Involutina

I. semicronstrictus

- Pesudostaffella

P. atokensis

- Profusulinella

P. fittsi
P. millcreekensis

- Reophax

R. fittsi
R. tumidulus

- Thurramminoides

T. sphaeroidalis

=== Trace Fossils ===
- Conostichus

C. arkansanus
