= Pacific spoon-nose eel =

Scientific classification
- Kingdom: Animalia
- Phylum: Chordata
- Class: Actinopterygii
- Order: Anguilliformes
- Family: Ophichthidae
- Genus: Echiophis
- Species: E. brunneus

Binomial name
- Echiophis brunneus (Castro-Aguirre & Suárez de los Cobos, 1983)

Synonyms
- Notophtophis brunneus Castro-Aguirre & Suárez de los Cobos, 1983

Species of fish

The Pacific spoon-nose eel (Echiophis brunneus, also known commonly as the Fangjaw eel in Mexico) is an eel in the family Ophichthidae (worm/snake eels). It was described by José Luis Castro-Aguirre and Sergio Suárez de los Cobos in 1983, originally under the genus Notophtophis. It is a marine, tropical eel which is known from the eastern central and southeastern Pacific Ocean, including the Gulf of California, Colombia, Mexico, Costa Rica, Nicaragua, Ecuador and Panama. It dwells at a maximum depth of 10 metres (33 ft), and inhabits sand and mud sediments. Males can reach a maximum total length of 140 centimetres (55 in), but more commonly reach a TL of 60 centimetres (24 in).

Due to its wide distribution, lack of known major threats, and lack of observed population decline, the IUCN redlist currently lists the Pacific spoon-nose eel as Least Concern. It is sometimes caught as by-catch by trawlers, but is usually discarded.
