= Spiraculata =

Scientific classification
- Kingdom: Animalia
- Phylum: Echinodermata
- Class: †Blastoidea
- Order: †Spiraculata; Jaekel, 1918

Genera
- See text

Extinct order of marine invertebrates

Spiraculata is an order of Blastoids. These blastoids are characterized by indirect entrance to the hydrospires through canals by way of pores.

== Genera ==
- Acentrotremites
- Ambolostoma
- Arcuoblastus
- Auloblastus
- Belocrinus
- Calycoblastus
- Carpenteroblastus
- Conuloblastus
- Cordyloblastus
- Costatoblastus
- Cribroblastus
- Cryptoblastus
- Decemoblastus
- Deliablastus
- Deltoblastus
- Dentiblastus
- Devonoblastus,
- Diploblastus
- Doryblastus
- Elaeacrinus
- Eleutherocrinus
- Ellipticoblastus
- Euryoblastus
- Globoblastus
- Gongyloblastus
- Granatocrinus
- Heteroblastus
- Houiblastus
- Iranoblastus
- Kadiskoblastus
- Lophoblastus
- Malchiblastus
- Metablastus
- Monadoblastus
- Monoblastus
- Monoschizablastus
- Montanablastus
- Nodoblastus
- Nucleocrinus
- Orbiblastus
- Orbitremites
- Pentephyllum
- Pentremites
- Pentremoblastus
- Perittoblastus
- Placoblastus
- Poroblastus
- Ptychoblastus
- Pyramiblastus
- Rhopaloblastus
- Schizoblastidae
- Schizoblastus
- Schizotremites
- Sinopetaloblastus
- Strongyloblastus
- Tanablastus
- Tricoelocrinus
- Troosticrinus
- Uyguroblastus
- Xinjiangoblastus
- Xyeleblastus
