= Aplatophis =

Scientific classification
- Domain: Eukaryota
- Kingdom: Animalia
- Phylum: Chordata
- Class: Actinopterygii
- Order: Anguilliformes
- Family: Ophichthidae
- Subfamily: Ophichthinae
- Genus: Aplatophis; J. E. Böhlke, 1956

Species
- See text.

Genus of fishes

Aplatophis is a genus of eels in the snake-eel family Ophichthidae with these species:

- Aplatophis chauliodus J. E. Böhlke, 1956 (fangtooth snake-eel)
- Aplatophis zorro McCosker & D. R. Robertson, 2001 (snaggle-toothed snake-eel)
