= Halianthella =

Scientific classification
- Kingdom: Animalia
- Phylum: Cnidaria
- Subphylum: Anthozoa
- Class: Hexacorallia
- Order: Actiniaria
- Family: Halcampidae
- Genus: Halianthella

Species
- See text

Genus of sea anemones

Halianthella is a genus of sea anemones in the family Halcampidae.

== Species ==
Species in the genus include:

- Halianthella annularis Carlgren, 1938
- Halianthella kerguelensis (Studer, 1879)
