= Snaggle-toothed snake-eel =

Conservation status
- Data Deficient (IUCN 3.1)

Scientific classification
- Kingdom: Animalia
- Phylum: Chordata
- Class: Actinopterygii
- Division: Teleostei
- Order: Anguilliformes
- Family: Ophichthidae
- Genus: Aplatophis
- Species: A. zorro

Binomial name
- Aplatophis zorro McCosker & Robertson, 2001

Species of fish

The snaggle-toothed snake-eel (Aplatophis zorro) is an eel in the family Ophichthidae. It was described by John E. McCosker and David Ross Robertson in 2001. It is a marine, tropical eel which is known from a single specimen collected from Panama, in the eastern central Pacific Ocean. From the specimen it is known to dwell at a depth range of 5–10 metres (20–30 ft), and reach a maximum total length of 104 centimetres (41 in). Based on other eel species it is estimated to inhabit burrows on a permanent or semi-permanent basis, and feed on small fish and crustaceans.

The species epithet "zorro" refers to the resemblance the facial pore pattern bears to the fictional character's trademark slash mark. It being known from only one specimen, the IUCN redlist currently listing it as Data Deficient.
