= Mariceras =

Mariceras Temporal range: Late Carboniferous- Early Permian

Scientific classification
- Kingdom: Animalia
- Phylum: Mollusca
- Class: Cephalopoda
- Subclass: Nautiloidea
- Order: Nautilida
- Genus: †Mariceras; Ruzhentsev and Shimanskiy, 1954

Genus of molluscs

Mariceras is a genus of Late Carboniferous to Early Permian nautilids found in North America and central Asia. Its shell is like that of Schyphoceras but is less curved and smoother.
