= Lecythiocrinus =

Lecythiocrinus Temporal range: Pennsylvanian ~318–303 Ma

Scientific classification
- Domain: Eukaryota
- Kingdom: Animalia
- Phylum: Echinodermata
- Class: Crinoidea
- Order: †Cyathocrinida
- Family: †Codiacrinidae
- Subfamily: †Codiacrininae
- Genus: †Lecythiocrinus; White 1880

Species
- L. asymmetricus Moore and Strimple, 1973; L. sacculus Bowsher and Strimple, 1986

Extinct genus of sea lily

Lecythiocrinus is an extinct genus of sea lily belonging to the order Cyathocrinida and family Codiacrinidae. Species of this genus have been found in Pennsylvanian beds in Australia and North America.
