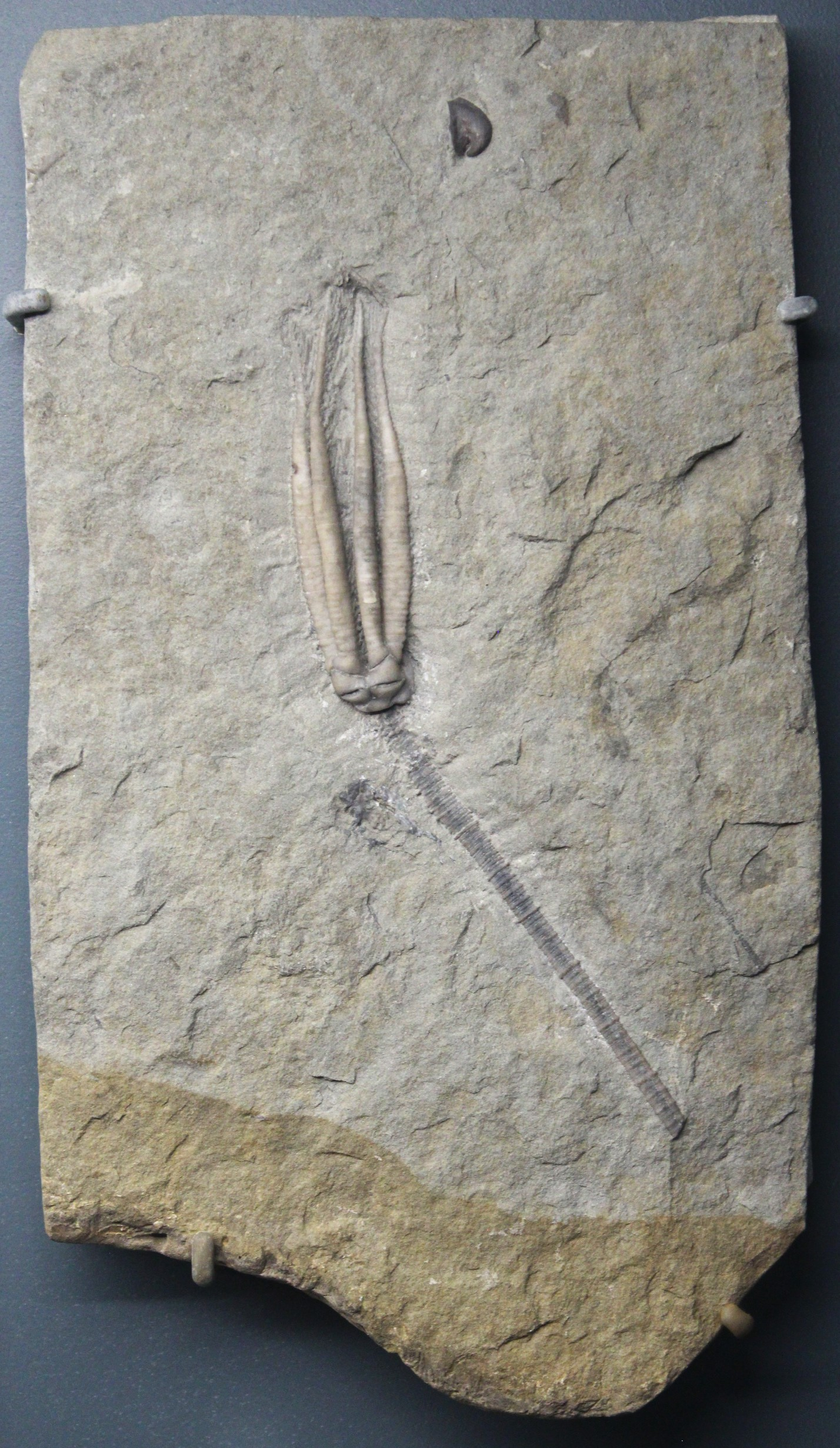
- Fossil of S. decadactylus, University of Michigan Museum of Natural History

Scientific classification
- Missing taxonomy template (fix): Scytalocrinus

= Scytalocrinus =

Scytalocrinus Temporal range: Carboniferous

Extinct genus of crinoids

Scytalocrinus is an extinct genus of crinoids.

== Fossil records ==
This genus is known in the fossil records of the Carboniferous period of United States and United Kingdom (age range: from 345.3 to 314.6 million years ago).

== Species ==
- Scytalocrinus barumensis Whidborne 1896
- Scytalocrinus crassibrachiatus Moore and Strimple 1973
- Scytalocrinus sansabensis Moore and Plummer 1940
