= Conostichus =

Conostichus Temporal range: Ordovician–Cretaceous

Trace fossil classification
- Ichnogenus: †Conostichus; Lesquereux, 1876

Type ichnospecies
- Conostichus omatus Lesquereux, 1876

Ichnospecies
- Conostichus omatus Lesquereux, 1876; Conostichus broadheadi Lesquereux, 1880; Conostichus typicus (King, 1955); Conostichus wycherlyi (King, 1955); Conostichus stouti Branson, 1961

Trace fossil of cnidarians

Conostichus is an ichnogenus of cnidarian trace fossil. They are nowadays considered to represent a burrow structure serving as a holdfast for an anemone-like organism.

== Description ==
Conostichus is a plug-shaped vertical trace fossil, with a diameter varying from half to double the height. Transverse constrictions and longitudinal fluting may be present, while the burrow fills occasionally show concentric laminae. The apex bears a twelve-fold symmetry, with the apical disc varying from small in C. broadheadi to broad and flat in C. typicus.

=== Preservation ===
The fossils display a wide variety of preservation modes, with well-preserved specimens being found alongside poorly preserved ones. The former are believed to be the result of rapid infilling with fine-grained carbonate particles, while the latter would have been passively filled with coarser carbonate sediments.

== Classification ==
Before being identified as a trace fossil, Conostichus was variously interpreted as a calcareous algae, or as a body fossil that decayed after being covered in sediment, and was later filled by another type of sediment. Branson (1961) classified Conostichus as part of Scyphomedusae, interpreting the fossils as representing a basal disk and lappets corresponding to the strobilation stage of modern scyphozoans. This hypothesis was later criticized, as it could not explain why the successive cones observed in Conostichus fossils did not share the same center and size, and were separated by layers of clay.

They are now believed to be trace fossils made by relatives of Actiniaria, possibly close to the Halcampoididae.

== See also ==
- Conichnus, a similar trace fossil
