= Powell Formation =

Geologic formation in the United States

- Stratigraphic range: Ordovician
- Type: Formation
- Underlies: Everton Formation
- Overlies: Cotter Formation

Lithology
- Primary: Dolomite
- Other: Shale, sandstone, chert

Location
- Region: Arkansas, Missouri and Virginia
- Country: United States

Type section
- Named for: Powell railroad station (now abandoned), Marion County, Arkansas
- Named by: Edward Oscar Ulrich

The Powell Formation or Powell Dolomite is a geologic formation in northern Arkansas, southeast Missouri and Virginia. It contains gastropod, cephalopod, and trilobite fossils dating back to the Ordovician Period.

== See also ==
- List of fossiliferous stratigraphic units in Arkansas
- List of fossiliferous stratigraphic units in Missouri
- List of fossiliferous stratigraphic units in Virginia
