= Paragassizocrinus =

Paragassizocrinus Temporal range: Pennsylvanian ~318–303 Ma

Scientific classification
- Domain: Eukaryota
- Kingdom: Animalia
- Phylum: Echinodermata
- Class: Crinoidea
- Family: †Agassizocrinidae
- Genus: †Paragassizocrinus; Moore and Plummer 1940

Extinct genus of sea lily

Paragassizocrinus is an extinct genus of sea lily belonging to the family Agassizocrinidae.
