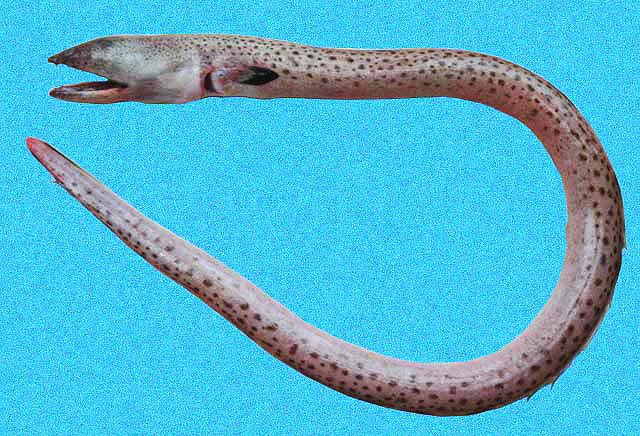

Conservation status
- Least Concern (IUCN 3.1)

Scientific classification
- Kingdom: Animalia
- Phylum: Chordata
- Class: Actinopterygii
- Order: Anguilliformes
- Family: Ophichthidae
- Genus: Echiophis
- Species: E. punctifer

Binomial name
- Echiophis punctifer (Kaup, 1859)
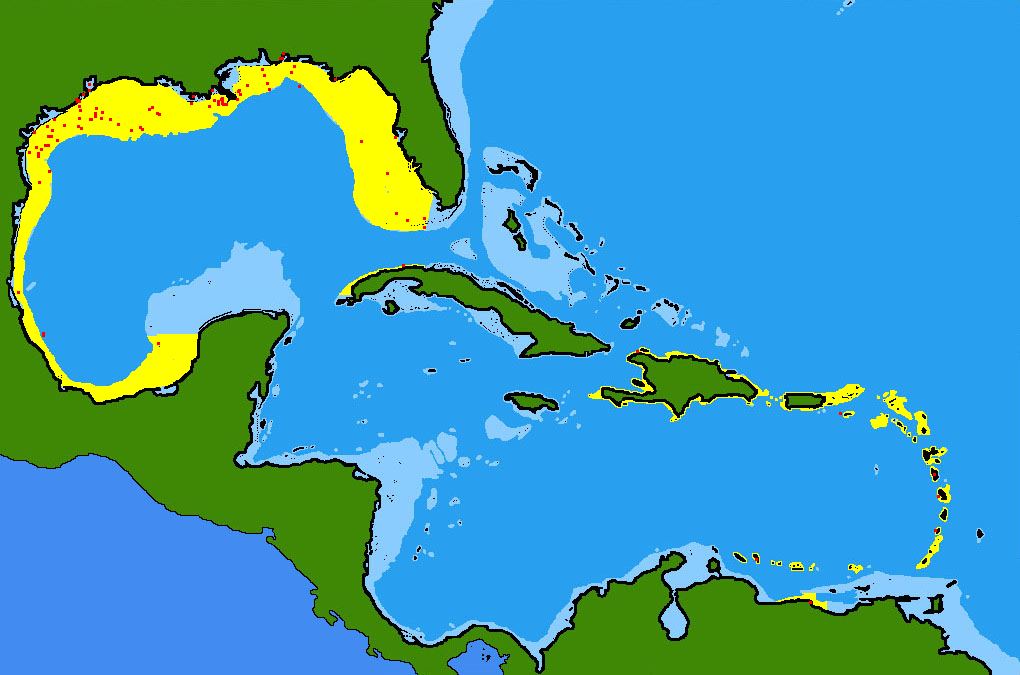

Synonyms
- Crotalopsis punctifer Kaup, 1859; Mystriophis punctifer (Kaup, 1859); Conger mordax Poey, 1860; Echiophis mordax (Poey, 1860); Ophichthys schneideri Steindachner, 1879; Mystriophis creutzbergi Cadenat, 1956; Echiophis creutzbergi (Cadenat, 1956)

= Echiophis punctifer =

Species of fish

Echiophis punctifer, the stippled spoon-nose eel, spoon-nose eel or snapper eel, is an eel in the family Ophichthidae (worm/snake eels). It was described by Johann Jakob Kaup in 1859. It is a marine, tropical eel which is known from the western and eastern Atlantic Ocean, including the Gulf of Mexico, Cuba, northern South America, Senegal, and Angola. It dwells at a depth range of 40 to 100 metres (130 to 330 ft), and inhabits shallow bays and lagoons, in which it forms burrows in mud and sand. Males can reach a maximum total length of 180 centimetres (71 in), but more commonly reach a TL of 100 centimetres (39 in).

The species epithet "punctifer", treated as a name in apposition, means "dotted" in Latin, and refers to the eel's colouration.

The eel is pinkish in color and has small dots, similar to leopard print.
