= José Luis Castro Aguirre =

Mexican ichthyologist (1943–2011)

José Luis Castro Aguirre (24 June 1943 – 20 January 2011) was a Mexican ichthyologist. He was a founding member of the Mexican Ichthyological Society and a member of the National System of Investigators who produced around 150 publications, focusing chiefly on the taxonomy, ecology, and biogeography of the fishes of Mexico. His 1978 book Catálogo sistemático de los peces marinos que penetran en aguas continentales de México, con aspectos zoogeográficos y ecológicos ("Systematic catalog of marine fish entering inland waters of Mexico, with zoogeographical and ecological aspects") was the first catalog of estuarine fishes of Mexico. Born in Mexico City, he attended the National School of Biological Sciences at the National Polytechnic Institute (ENCB-IPN) earning a master's degree in 1974 and a PhD in 1986. He worked at the National Fisheries Institute and the Food and Agriculture Organization in the 1960s, and later was professor and researcher at the ENCB-IPN, Universidad Autónoma Metropolitana (UAM; 1979–1987), the Interdisciplinary Center of Marine Science (CICIMAR; 1976–1979, 1994–2011) and Northeast Center of Biological Research (CIBNOR; 1987–1994). He described around a dozen fish species, including several species of shark. A book of research papers in his honor was produced in 2012.

== Taxon described by him ==
- The Pacific spoon-nose eel, Echiophis brunneus.
- The Mexican hornshark Heterodontus mexicanus

== Taxon named in his honor ==
- He was posthumously commemorated in the names of the fish species Hypoplectrus castroaguirrei (a hamlet) and Eugerres castroaguirrei (a mojarra).
