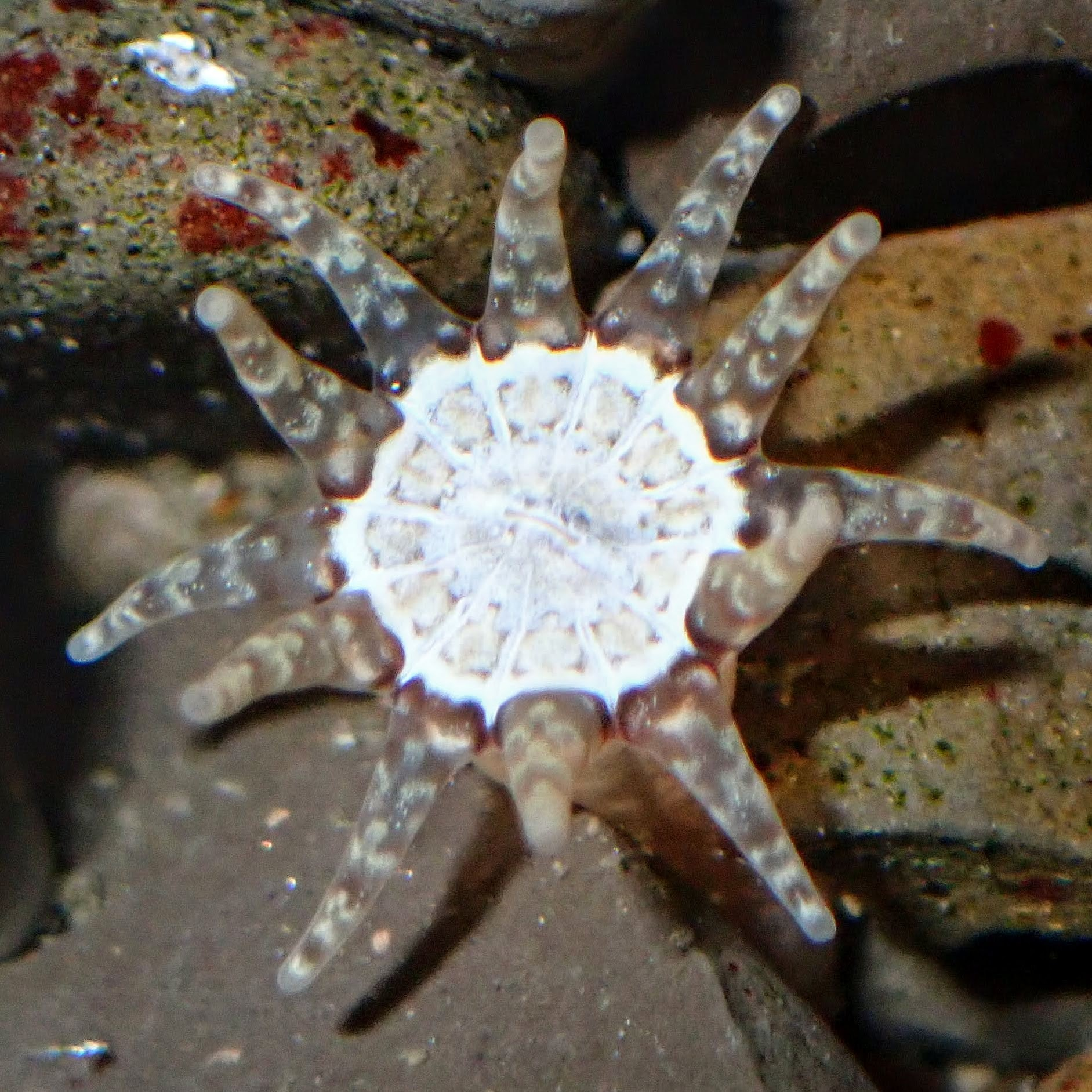
- Halcampa crypta

Scientific classification
- Kingdom: Animalia
- Phylum: Cnidaria
- Subphylum: Anthozoa
- Class: Hexacorallia
- Order: Actiniaria
- Superfamily: Metridioidea
- Family: Halcampidae; Andres, 1883

Genera
- See text

Synonyms
- Halcampoididae Appellöf, 1896

= Halcampidae =

Family of sea anemones

Halcampidae is a family of sea anemones. Members of this family usually live with their column buried in sand or other soft substrates.

== Genera ==
Genera in the family include:

- Acthelmis Lütken, 1875
- Cactosoma Danielssen, 1890
- Calamactinia Carlgren, 1949
- Calamactis Carlgren, 1951
- Halcampa Gosse, 1858
- Halcampaster
- Halcampella Andres, 1883
- Halcampoides Danielssen, 1890
- Halianthella
- Kodioides
- Mena
- Metedwardsia
- Neohalcampa
- Parahalcampa
- Pentactinia Carlgren, 1900
- Scytophorus Hertwig, 1882
- Siphonactinopsis Carlgren, 1921

== Characteristics ==
Species of Halcampidae mostly have elongated columns which are sometimes differentiated into different regions. The base is usually rounded but in some species it is flattened. There is no sphincter. There are up to forty tentacles, all of equal length. There are up to twenty pairs of perfect mesenteries (internal partitions) with strong retractors. There are one or two siphonoglyphs (ciliated grooves).
