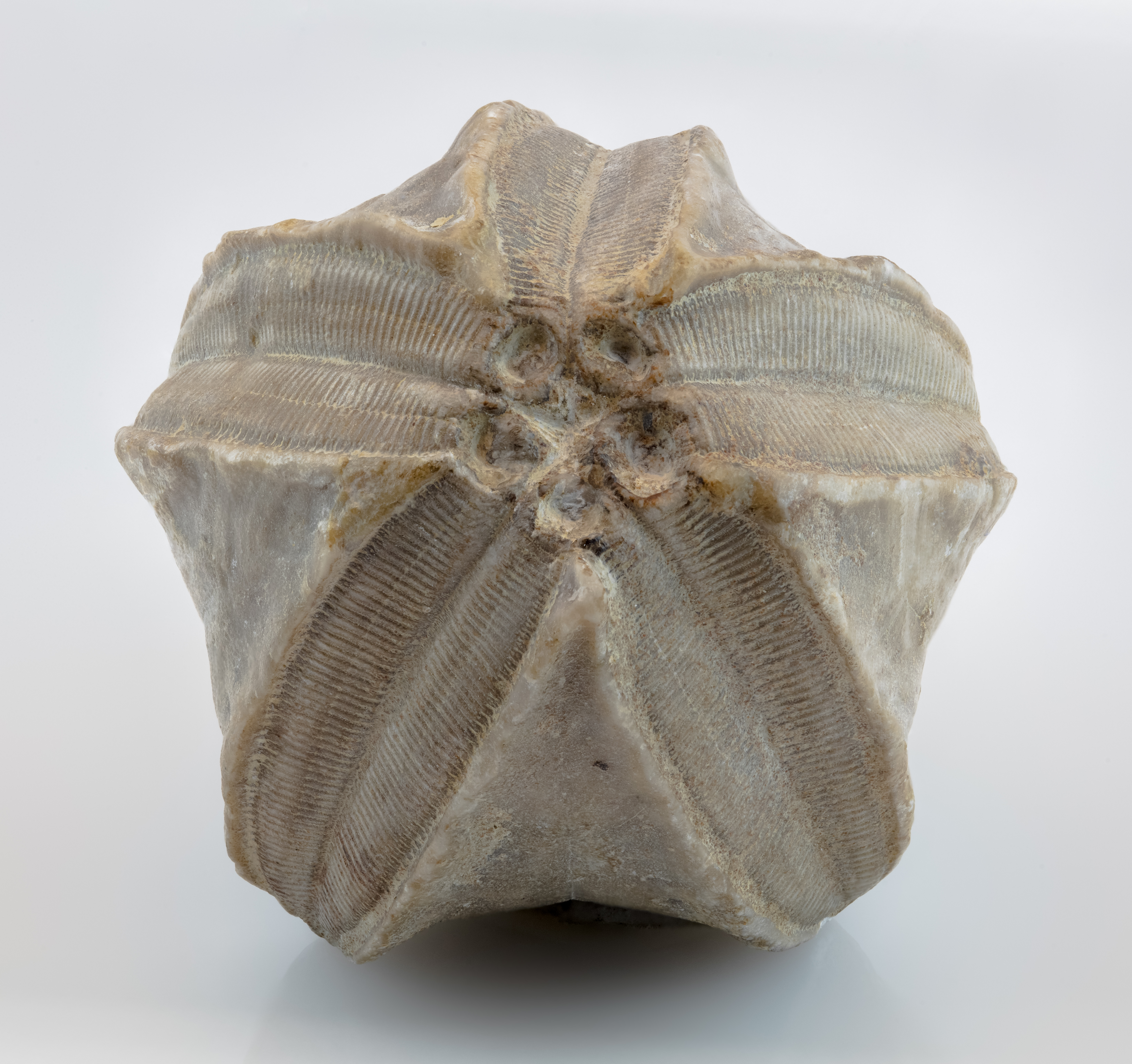
- Pentremites godoni from the Lower Carboniferous of Illinois.

Scientific classification
- Kingdom: Animalia
- Phylum: Echinodermata
- Class: †Blastoidea
- Order: †Spiraculata
- Family: †Pentremitidae
- Genus: †Pentremites; Say, 1820

Species
- Pentremites aridus Webster and Lane 1970; Pentremites conoideus Hall 1856; Pentremites cristalensis Macurder 1964; Pentremites elongatus Shumard 1855; Pentremites godoni; Pentremites kirki Hambach 1903; Pentremites pentremites Hernon 1935; Pentremites pyriformis; Pentremites rusticus Hambach 1903; Pentremites sulcatus Roemer 1851

= Pentremites =

Pentremites Temporal range: Early Carboniferous

Extinct genus of marine invertebrates

Pentremites is an extinct genus of blastoid echinoderm belonging to the family Pentremitidae.

== Description ==
These stalked echinoderms averaged a height of about 11 centimetres (4.3 in) but occasionally ranged up to about 3 times that size. They, like other blastoids, superficially resemble their distant relatives, the crinoids or sea lilies, having a near-identical, planktivorous lifestyle living on the sea floor attached by a stalk. As with all other blastoids, species of Pentremites trapped food floating in the currents by means of tentacle-like appendages.

Pentremites species lived in the early to middle Carboniferous, from 360.7 to 314.6 Ma. Its fossils are known from North America.
