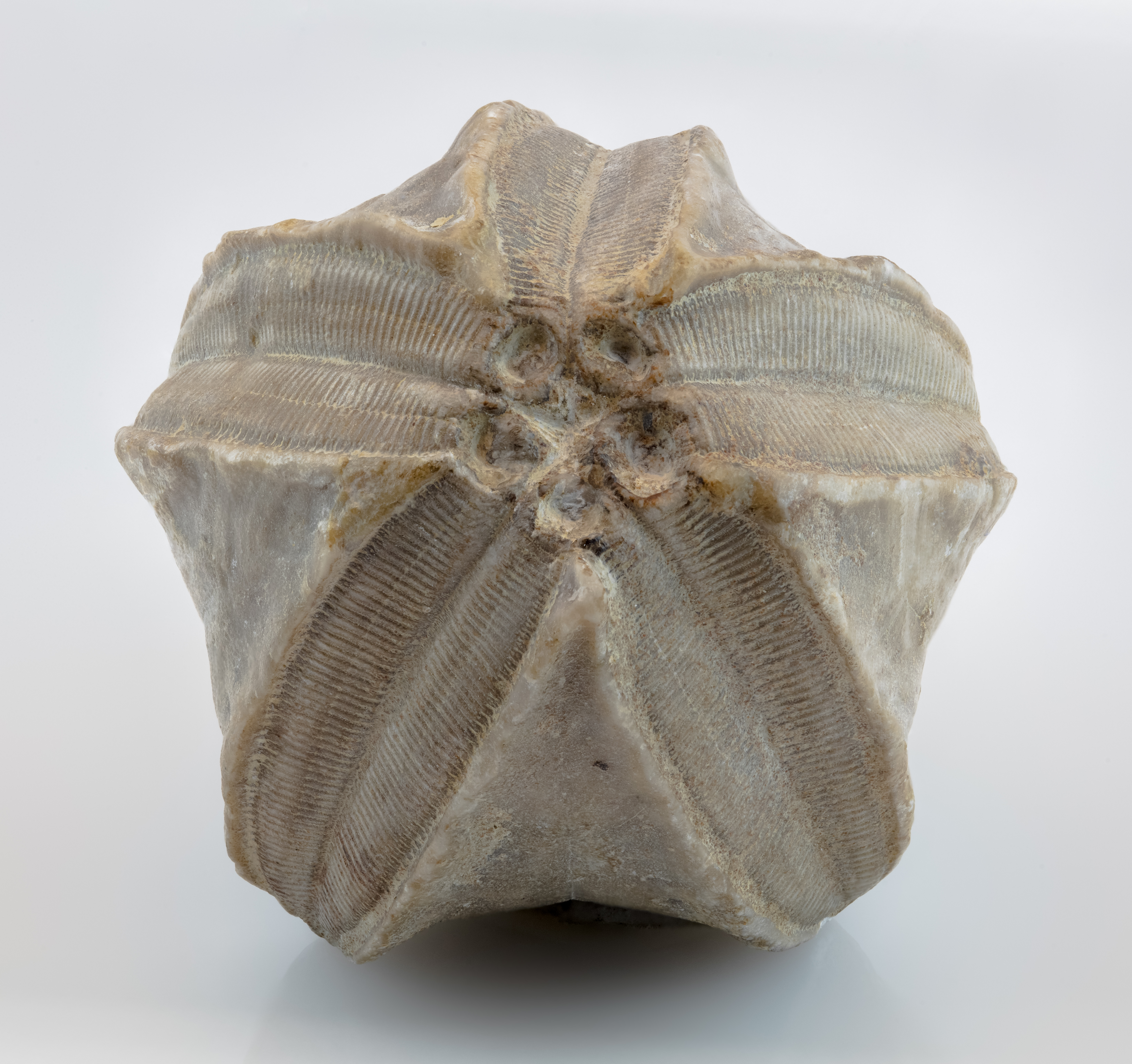
- Pentremites godoni, a blastoid from the Lower Carboniferous of Illinois.

Scientific classification
- Domain: Eukaryota
- Kingdom: Animalia
- Phylum: Echinodermata
- Subphylum: †Blastozoa
- Class: †Blastoidea; Say, 1825

Orders
- Fissiculata; Spiraculata; Incertae sedis: †Macurdablastus

= Blastoid =

Blastoids Temporal range: Ordovician - Permian

Extinct class of marine invertebrates

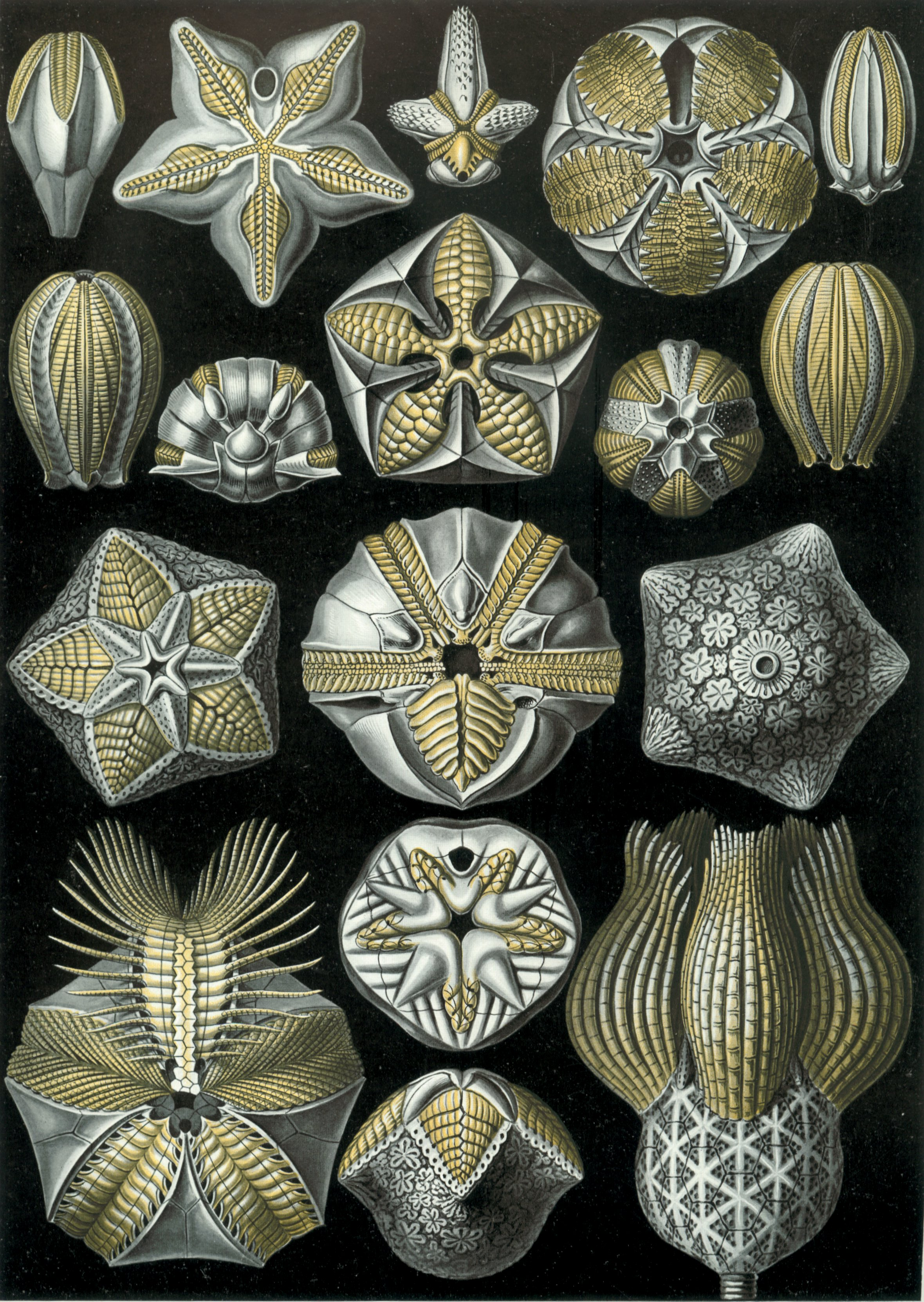
"Blastoidea", from Ernst Haeckel's Art Forms of Nature, 1904

Blastoids (class Blastoidea) are an extinct type of stemmed echinoderm, often referred to as sea buds. They first appear, along with many other echinoderm classes, in the Ordovician period, and reached their greatest diversity in the Mississippian subperiod of the Carboniferous period. However, blastoids may have originated in the Cambrian. Blastoids persisted until their extinction at the end of Permian, about 250 million years ago. Although never as diverse as their contemporary relatives, the crinoids, blastoids are common fossils, especially in many Mississippian-age rocks.

== Description ==
Like most echinoderms, blastoids were protected by a set of interlocking plates of calcium carbonate, which formed the main body, or theca. In life, the theca of a typical blastoid was attached to a stalk or column made up of stacked disc-shaped plates. The other end of the column was attached to the ocean floor by a holdfast, very much like stalked crinoids. The stalk was usually relatively short, and in some species, was absent, with the holdfast being attached directly to the base of the theca.

The mouth was at the summit of the theca. Radiating like flower petals from the center were five food grooves, or ambulacra. Each ambulacrum had many long thin fine structures called brachioles, which were used to trap food particles and bring them to the mouth. Brachioles were delicate structures, and in fossils are not usually preserved in place. A series of five spiracle plates surrounded the star-shaped mouth, which included the anus, mouth and entrances to a set of five complex, folded respiratory organs known as hydrospires. These spiracles prevented mixing of the various fluids. Waste elimination was through the anispiracle, an opening formed by the fusing of anus and adjacent spiracles.

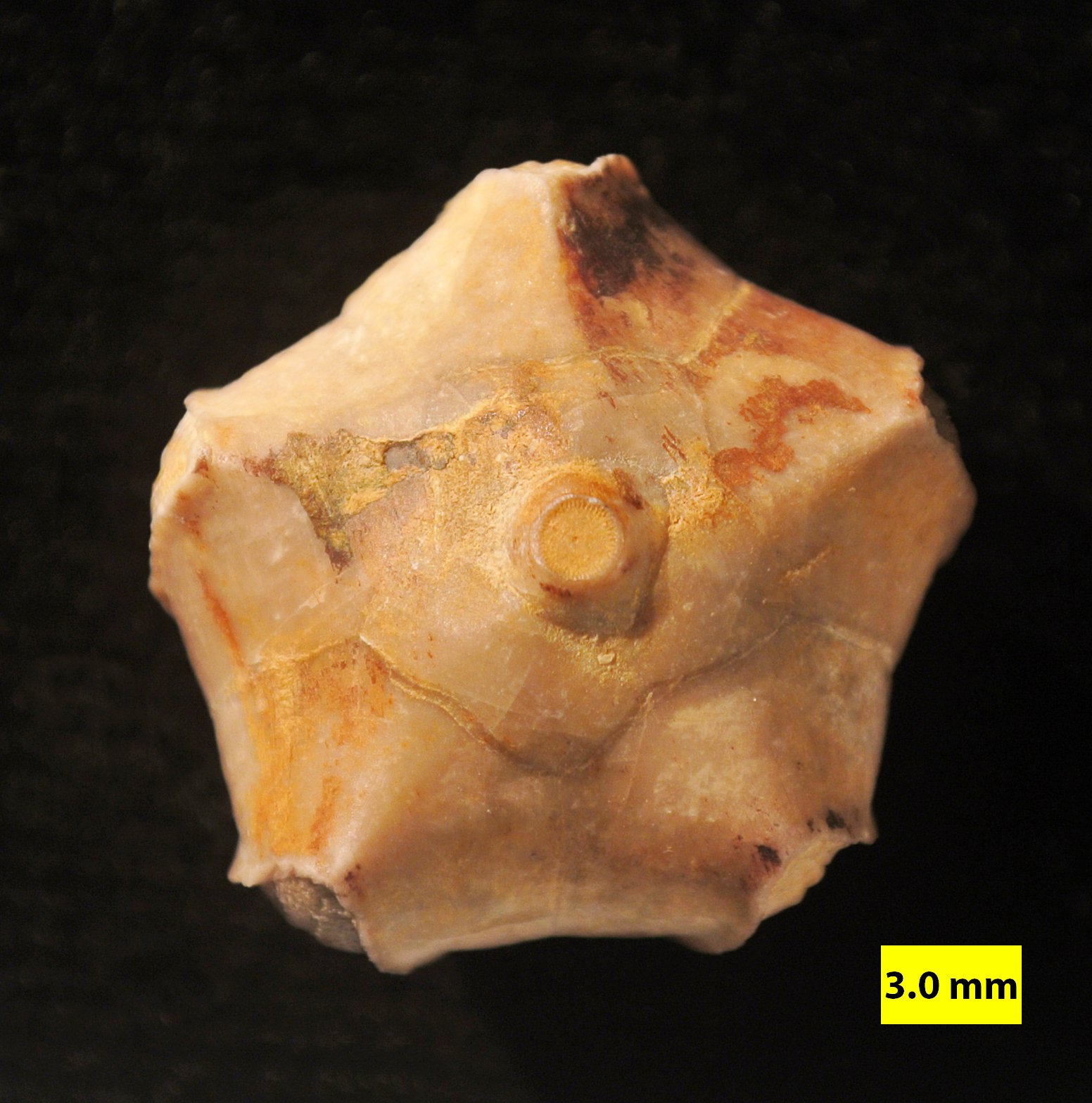
Pentremites godoni, a blastoid from the Lower Carboniferous of Illinois; basal view of theca.

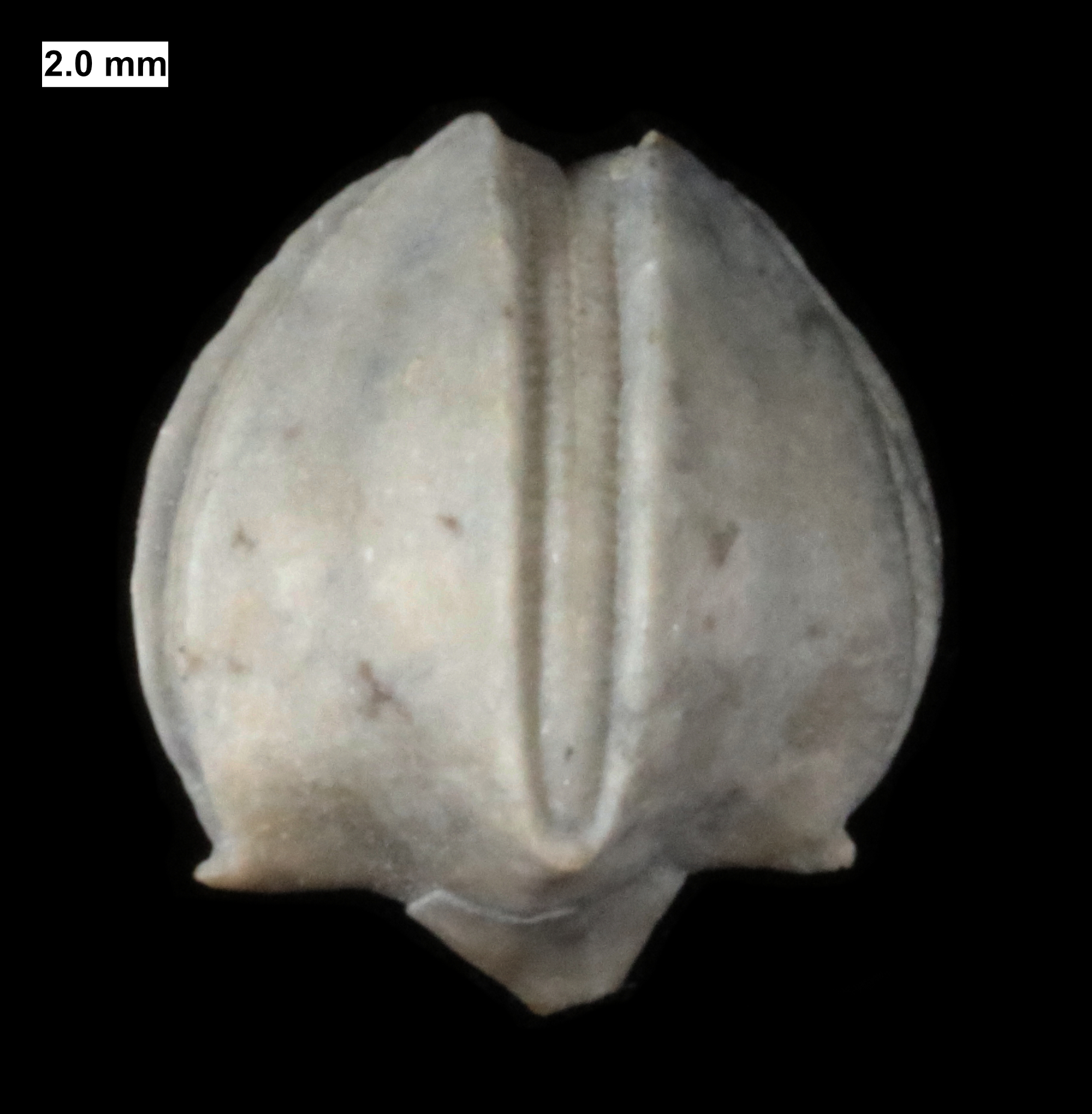
The Middle Devonian blastoid Hyperoblastus from the Milwaukee Formation; Wisconsin; lateral view of theca.

Like crinoids, blastoids were high-level stalked suspension feeders (feeding mainly on planktonic organisms) that inhabited clear-to-silty, moderately agitated ocean waters from shelf to basin. The food gathering system of blastoids consisted of several types of ambulacra. Food entered the brachiolar ambulacra, was transferred to the side ambulacra through the brachiolar pit, then transferred to the main (median) ambulacra, and finally entered the mouth. Each of these ambulacra was roofed by cover plates. The cover plates of the brachiolar groove were movable and could open, allowing food to enter, or close as needed. Other cover plates may also have been movable.

== Taxonomy ==
Blastoids are assumed to have evolved from the Cystoids. Blastoids are subdivided into two orders: Fissiculata, which are characterized by direct entrance to the individual hydrospires by way of slits; and Spiraculata, which are characterized by indirect entrance to the hydrospires through canals by way of pores. The earliest blastoid yet found, Macurdablastus from the Middle Ordovician of Tennessee, cannot be classified as either order.
