= Tabulipora =

Tabulipora Temporal range: Carboniferous-Permian ~361–252 Ma

Scientific classification
- Kingdom: Animalia
- Phylum: Bryozoa
- Class: Stenolaemata
- Order: †Trepostomatida
- Family: †Stenoporidae
- Genus: †Tabulipora; Young, 1883

Species
- See text

Extinct genus of bryozoan

Tabulipora is an extinct genus of bryozoans belonging to the order Trepostomatida. It has been found in beds of Permian age in North America, Spitzbergen, South America, and Asia. Specimens typically form cylindrical branching colonies.

== Species ==
- T. aberrans Morozova 1986
- T. acuta Morozova 1970
- T. ambigua Kiseleva 1982
- T. angjiensis Xia 1986
- T. arcticensis Ross and Ross 1962
- T. carbonaria Worthen 1875
- T. colvillensis Gilmour and Snyder 2000
- T. decipiens Liu 1980
- T. demissa Trizna 1961
- T. ellesmerensis Sakagami 1998
- T. exilaporata Romantchuk 1970
- T. frugiformis Xia 1986
- T. germana Romantchuk 1970
- T. greenlandensis Ross and Ross 1962
- T. kansuensis Yang 1958
- T. ordinata Morozova 1970
- T. parva Liu 1980
- T. siedleckii Malecki 1968
- T. tenuinervis Bassler 1929
