= List of fossiliferous stratigraphic units in Arkansas =

This article contains a list of fossil-bearing stratigraphic units in the state of Arkansas, U.S.

== Sites ==
Group or Formation	Period	Notes
Annona Chalk	Cretaceous	
Arkadelphia Marl	Cretaceous	
Austin Chalk	Cretaceous	
Batesville Sandstone	Carboniferous	
Bloyd Shale	Carboniferous	
Boone Formation	Carboniferous	
Brownstown Marl	Cretaceous	
Cane Hill Member of Hale Formation	Carboniferous	
Claiborne Formation	Paleogene	
Collier Shale	Cambrian	
Comanche Formation	Cretaceous	
De Queen Formation	Cretaceous	
Dierks Limestone	Cretaceous	
Everton Formation	Ordovician	
Fayetteville Shale	Carboniferous	
Hale Formation	Carboniferous	
Hindsville Member of Batesville Formation	Carboniferous	
Imo Formation	Carboniferous	
Jackson Group/White Bluff Formation	Paleogene	
Kimmswick Limestone	Ordovician	
Marlbrook Marl	Cretaceous	
Midway Group	Paleogene	
Moorefield Formation	Carboniferous	
Morrow Group/Bloyd Formation	Carboniferous	
Nacatoch Formation	Cretaceous	
Nacatoch Sand	Cretaceous	
Navarro Group/Saratoga Chalk	Cretaceous	
Ozan Formation	Cretaceous	
Pentremital Limestone Group/Bloyd Formation	Carboniferous	
Pitkin Formation	Carboniferous	
Powell Formation	Ordovician	
Saratoga Chalk	Cretaceous	
Smackover Formation	Jurassic	
Smithville Formation	Ordovician	
St. Clair Limestone	Silurian	
St. Joe Formation	Carboniferous	
Taylor Group/Annona Chalk	Cretaceous	
Taylor Group/Ozan Formation	Cretaceous	
Theodosia Formation	Ordovician	
Trinity Group/Holly Creek Formation	Cretaceous	
Winslow Formation	Carboniferous	
Witts Springs Formation	Carboniferous	

== See also ==
- Paleontology in Arkansas
