= Paleontology in Arkansas =

Paleontological research occurring within or conducted by Arkansas

The location of the state of Arkansas

Paleontology in Arkansas refers to paleontological research occurring within or conducted by people from the U.S. state of Arkansas. The fossil record of Arkansas spans from the Ordovician to the Eocene. Nearly all of the state's fossils have come from ancient invertebrate life. During the early Paleozoic, much of Arkansas was covered by seawater. This sea would come to be home to creatures including Archimedes, brachiopods, and conodonts. This sea would begin its withdrawal during the Carboniferous, and by the Permian the entire state was dry land. Terrestrial conditions continued into the Triassic, but during the Jurassic, another sea encroached into the state's southern half. During the Cretaceous the state was still covered by seawater and home to marine invertebrates such as Belemnitella. On land the state was home to long necked sauropod dinosaurs, who left behind footprints and ostrich dinosaurs such as Arkansaurus.

During the Cenozoic the state's seas were inhabited by marine invertebrates and sharks, although the waters were gradually shrinking away. During the Ice Age, the state's climate cooled. Local grasslands and forests spread that were inhabited by creatures such as mammoths, mastodons, and giant ground sloths.

== Prehistory ==
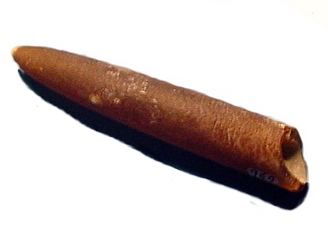
Belemnitella.

No Precambrian fossils are known from Arkansas, so the state's fossil record does not begin until the Paleozoic. During the Paleozoic northern, central, and western Arkansas was covered by seawater. During the Ordovician, the life inhabiting modern Arkansas was diverse. Remains of life from this period fossilized in the East Lafferty Creek and Cushman areas of Independence County. Silurian Arkansas was also home to a great diversity of life. Remains from this period, like the Ordovician, were preserved in the Cushman area of Independence County. During the ensuing Devonian period, conodonts and Sporangites were preserved at Caddo Gap in Montgomery County.

Carboniferous Arkansas was home to Archimedes and a variety of brachiopods. This fauna was preserved in the West Fork area of Washington County and the Fayetteville area. The Habberton area also preserves a diverse invertebrate fauna from this time period. During the early part of the Carboniferous, the Mississippian, Arkansas was home to a variety of marine invertebrates. Later in the period, the northern region of the state was exposed as dry land by the gradual withdrawal of the sea. Rivers flowed across this area of the state. Pennsylvanian Arkansas was home to the blastoid Pentremites, the brachiopods Composita and Spirifer, and other invertebrates. The sea had completely vanished by the start of the Permian. With the final retreat of the sea, local sedimentation had stopped and begun being eroded away.

Northern and central Arkansas was a terrestrial environment during the Triassic. However, by the early Jurassic seawater covered the southern region of the state. Southern and northeastern Arkansas were likewise covered by the sea into the Cretaceous. Local life left behind many fossils. During the Early Cretaceous, the region of Arkansas southeast of the Ouachita Mountains was submerged by the Gulf of Mexico. The invertebrates of Arkansas's Cretaceous sea included clams, echinoids, oysters, and snails. During the Cretaceous, Arkansas was home to Belemnitella, Exogyra, Ostrea, Turritella, and other marine invertebrates in the Arkadelphia area of Clark County. Fish of the same age left behind teeth in the area near Saratoga in Hempstead County. Other fossils in this area are similar to those of the preserved in contemporary deposits near Arkadelphia. During the Cretaceous Arkansas was home to the sea turtle Bothremys, which may have fed on ancient snails. During the Late Cretaceous the region now occupied by the Quachita Mountains of Arkansas may have attracted long necked plesiosaurs from hundreds of miles away as a source of gastroliths. Other vertebrates included sharks.

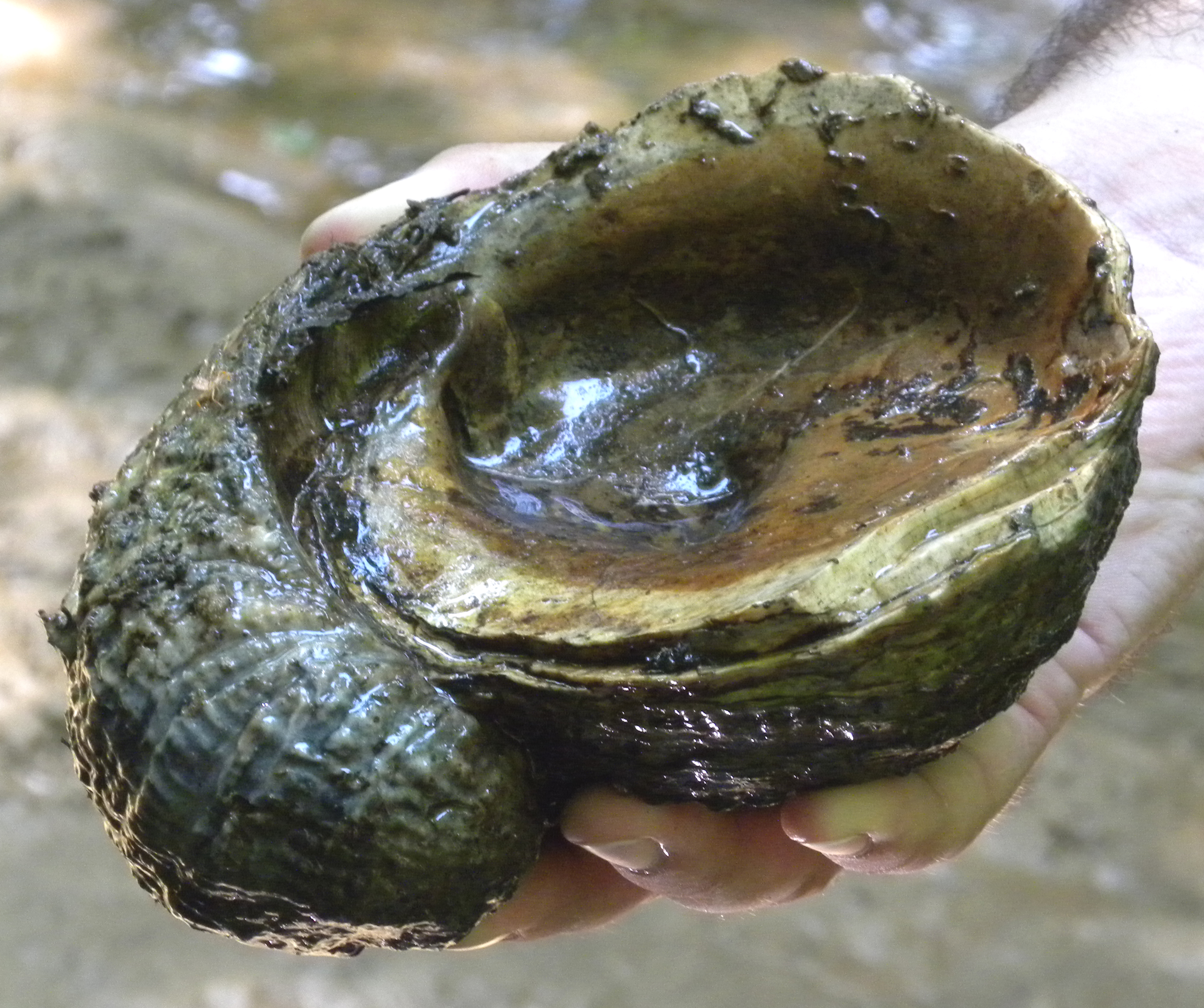
Exogyra.

Southwestern Arkansas was part of the coastline to the Western Interior Seaway during the Cretaceous. Dinosaurs roamed the ancient shorelines here both as individuals and in groups. Many footprints left by coastal sauropods have been preserved in the southwestern part of the state. The ornithomimosaur Arkansaurus fridayi lived at this time, known only from remains of its foot discovered in 1972.

The seas of southern and eastern Arkansas began to shrink during the early Cenozoic. Sharks and oysters were still present in its sea waters. During the Eocene epoch, Arkansas was home to a marine invertebrate fauna that included echinoderms, Ostrea, and Turritella. The echinoderm fossils were preserved in the Bradford area of Jackson County. The Ostrea fossils were preserved in the Bradford area of Jackson County and in the Forrest City area of St. Francis County. The Turritella fossils were preserved in the Bradford area of Jackson County. The sea gradually and inconsistently retreated toward the south, leaving the state altogether by the mid-to-late Tertiary. By this time rivers and swamps covered the southern half of the state. During the Ice Age, the state's climate cooled down. Most of Arkansas was covered by grasslands and forests. These were inhabited by creatures including giant ground sloths, mammoths, and mastodons.

== History ==
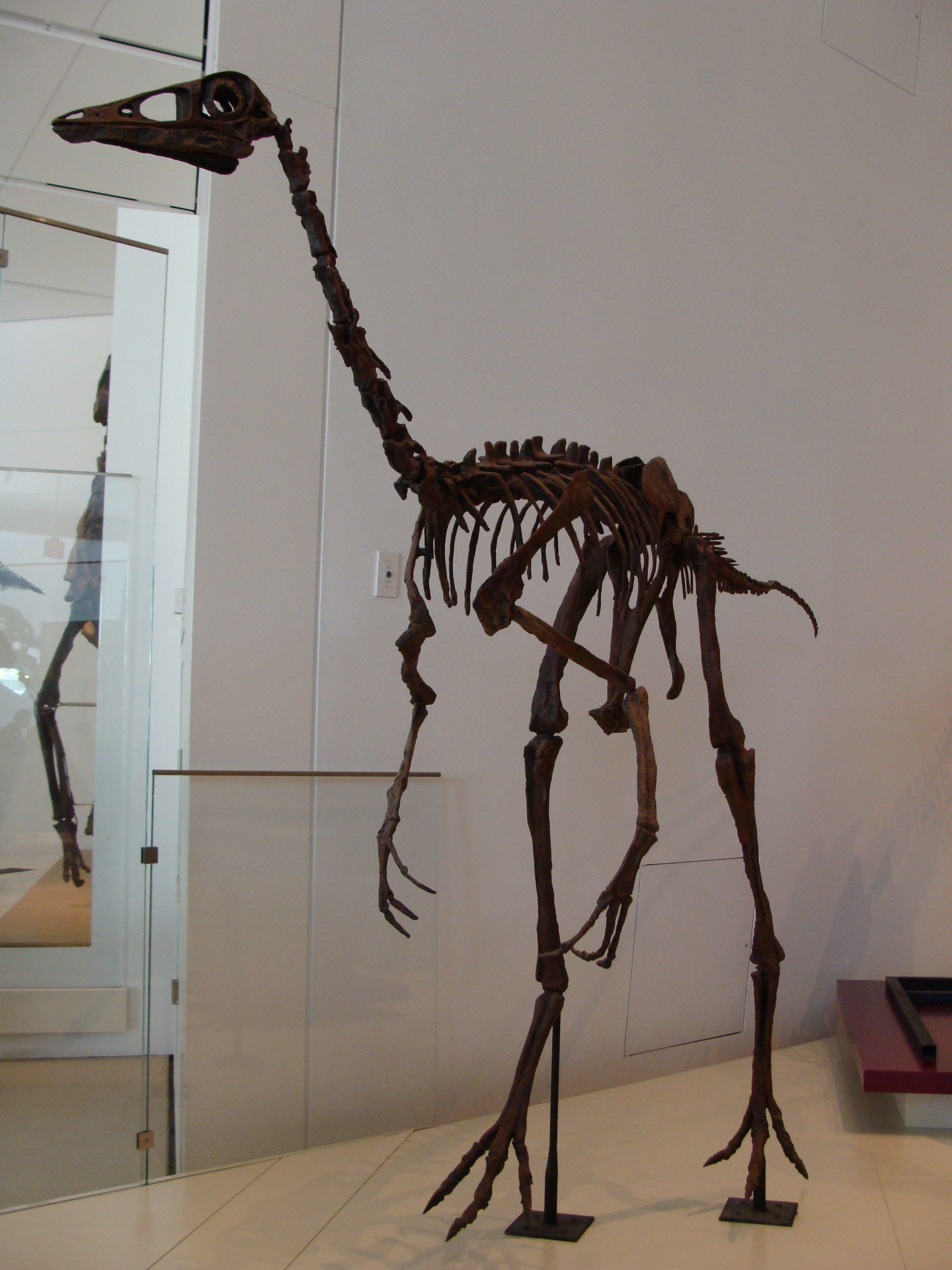
An ornithomimid.

In August 1972, J. B. Friday discovered dinosaur bones in a Sevier County gravel pit near Lockesburg. In 1973 the fossils Friday discovered were being cleaned and compared to related by dinosaurs by University of Arkansas professor James Harrison Quinn. In the course of his research, Quinn made hypothetical clay models of the missing bones in the animal's foot and duplicated the actual fossils with plaster cast in latex molds. Quinn published an abstract about the bones and nicknamed the animal "Arkansaurus fridayi". This abstract was the first scientific mention of any dinosaur bones ever found in Arkansas.

A gypsum quarry in southwestern Arkansas preserves dinosaur tracks, which have hindered the quarry operations. This is called the Briar Site. Some areas of the quarry were rough due to what appeared to be large potholes, which frustrated the drivers of the excavation equipment. In 1983, however these "potholes" were recognized as dinosaur footprints. Jeff Pittman was responsible for the correct identification of the tracks. At the time he was studying the quarry's sedimentology. After he visited the Purgatoire tracksite in Colorado he noticed that the local sauropod tracks resembled the "potholes" seen at the Briar site in Arkansas. Pittman later performed an aerial survey and found evidence for 10 parallel sauropod trackways on a rock surface that had also been extensively "trampled".

The Briar quarry has two separate surfaces that each preserve thousands of dinosaur tracks. The operations of the quarry continue to both uncover and destroy dinosaur footprints. In 1989 Pittman successfully dated the dinosaur tracks of the Briar quarry as equal in age to the lower Glen Rose Formation's megatracksites, which are more than 200 miles away.

In the fall of 1995 senior paleontologist of the Utah Geological Survey (then with Dinamation International), James Kirkland, examined the Arkansaurus foot and found it to be larger but otherwise nearly identical to a new species found two years prior in Utah rocks of Early Cretaceous age. Kirkland concurred that Arkansaurus was likely related to Ornithomimus. Future clues about Arkansaurus may come from a similar dinosaur discovery in Maryland that, as of 2007, has yet to be described.

From 2001 to 2003, then University of Arkansas undergraduate, ReBecca Hunt, studied the fossils and presented on them at several meetings, including the 2002 Society of Vertebrate Paleontology Annual Meeting, the 2002 Geological Society of America Annual Meeting, and the 2003 Arkansas Undergraduate Research Conference. Hunt published a brief description of the fossils with the limited scientific research available at the time.

== Paleontologists ==
- Helen Frances James was born in Hot Springs on 22 May, 1956.

== Natural history museums ==
- Museum of Discovery, Little Rock
- University of Arkansas Museum
- Arkansas State University Museum - Jonesboro

== See also ==
- Paleontology in Louisiana
- Paleontology in Mississippi
- Paleontology in Missouri
- Paleontology in Oklahoma
- Paleontology in Tennessee
- Paleontology in Texas
