= List of the Mesozoic life of Mississippi =

This list of the Mesozoic life of Mississippi contains the various prehistoric life-forms whose fossilized remains have been reported from within the US state of Mississippi and are between 252.17 and 66 million years of age.

== A ==
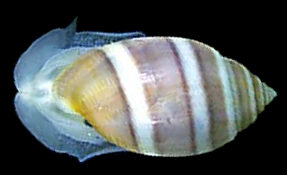
A living Acteon barrel bubble sea snail

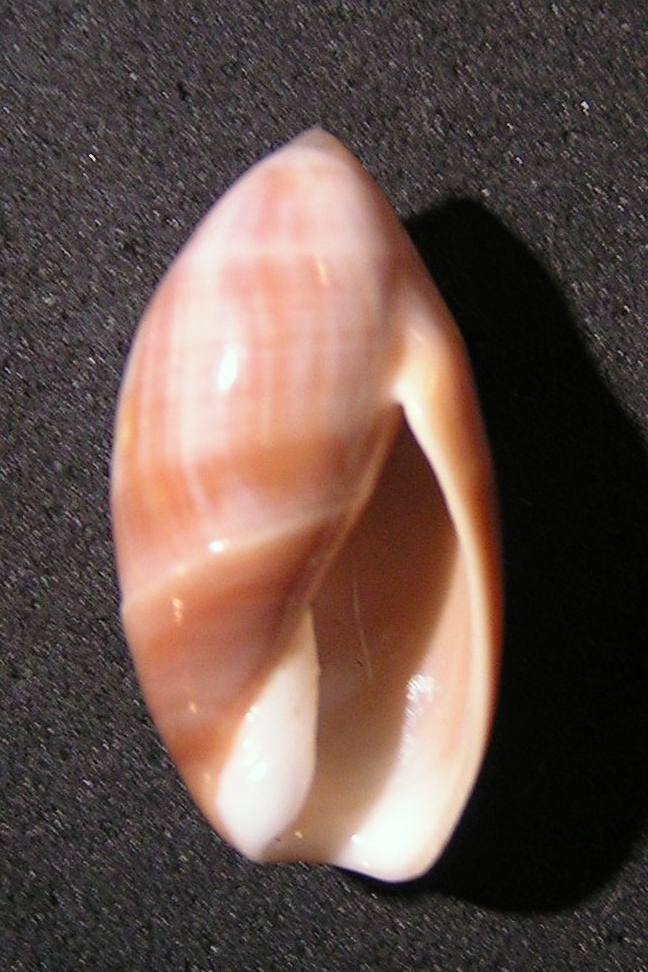
Shell of an Ancilla sea snail

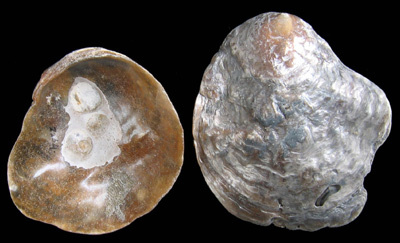
Interior and exterior of a shell of an Anomia, or jingle shell

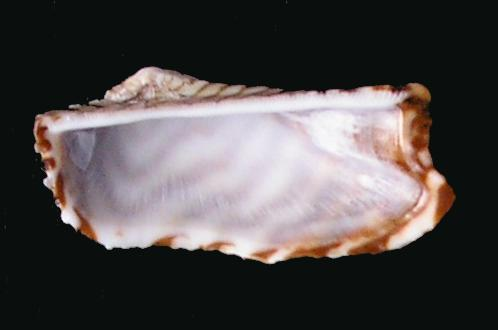
Interior of the shell of an Arca ark clam

- Acesta
  - †Acesta riddlei
- †Aciculiscala
  - †Aciculiscala acuta
  - †Aciculiscala coffea
- Acirsa
  - †Acirsa clathrata
  - †Acirsa culmosa
  - †Acirsa flexicostata
  - †Acirsa gravida
  - †Acirsa implexa
  - †Acirsa microstriata – or unidentified comparable form
  - †Acirsa wadei
- Acmaea
- †Acrocoelum – tentative report
  - †Acrocoelum cereum
- †Acteon
  - †Acteon cicatricosus
  - †Acteon pistilliformis
- †Acutostrea
  - †Acutostrea plumosa
- †Aenona
  - †Aenona eufaulensis
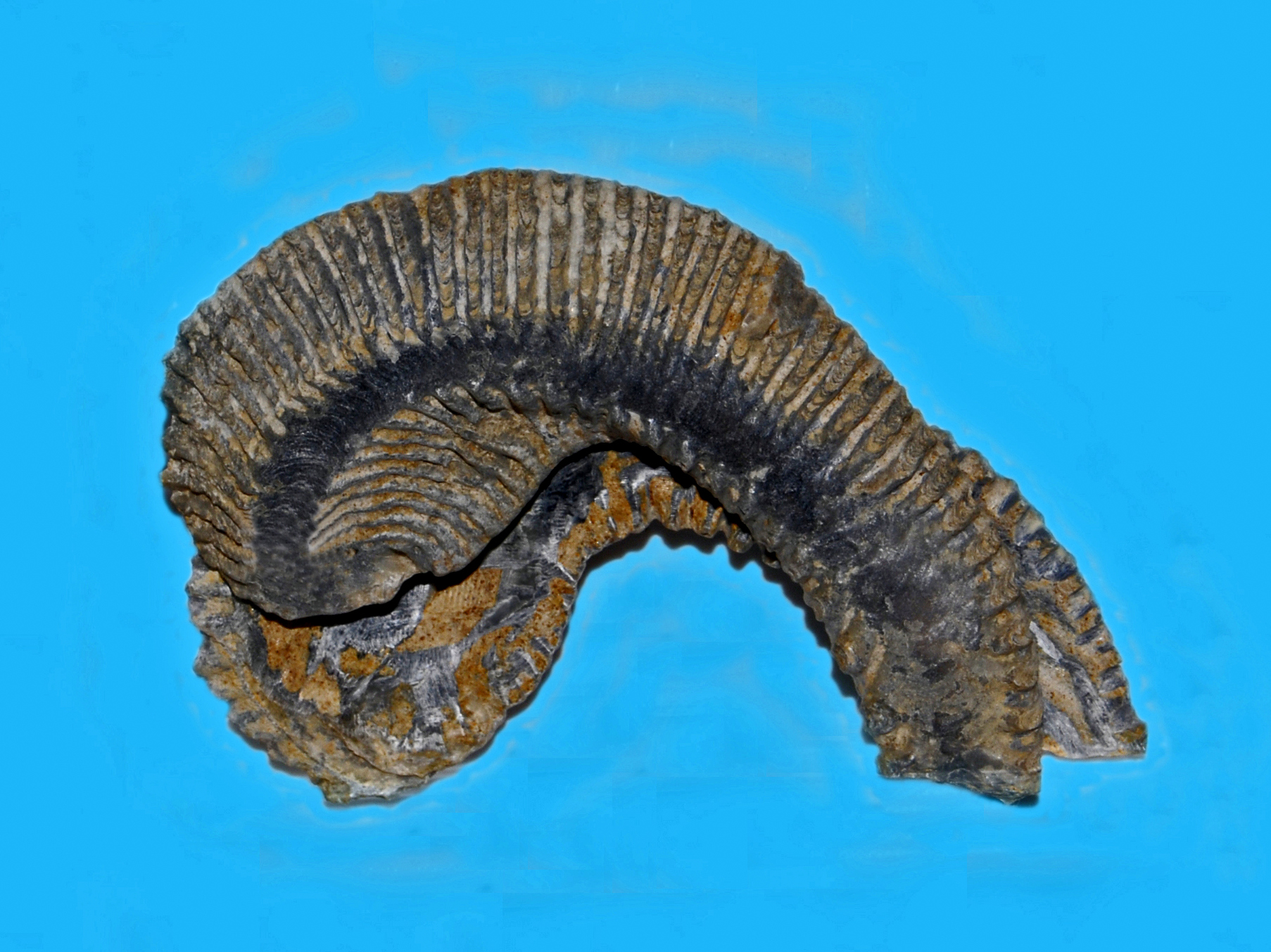
- Fossilized shell of the Late Cretaceous oyster Agerostrea
  †Agerostrea
  - †Agerostrea mesenterica
- †Aliofusus
  - †Aliofusus stamineus
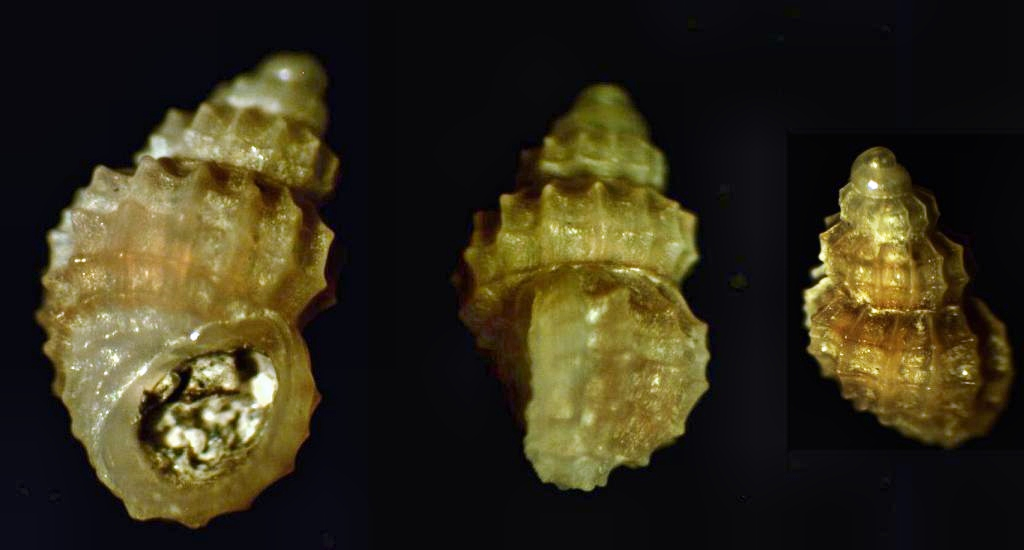
- Shells in multiple views of Alvania sea snails
  Alvania
  - †Alvania tallahatchiensis
- †Amaurellina
  - †Amaurellina stephensoni
- †Ambigostrea
  - †Ambigostrea tecticosta
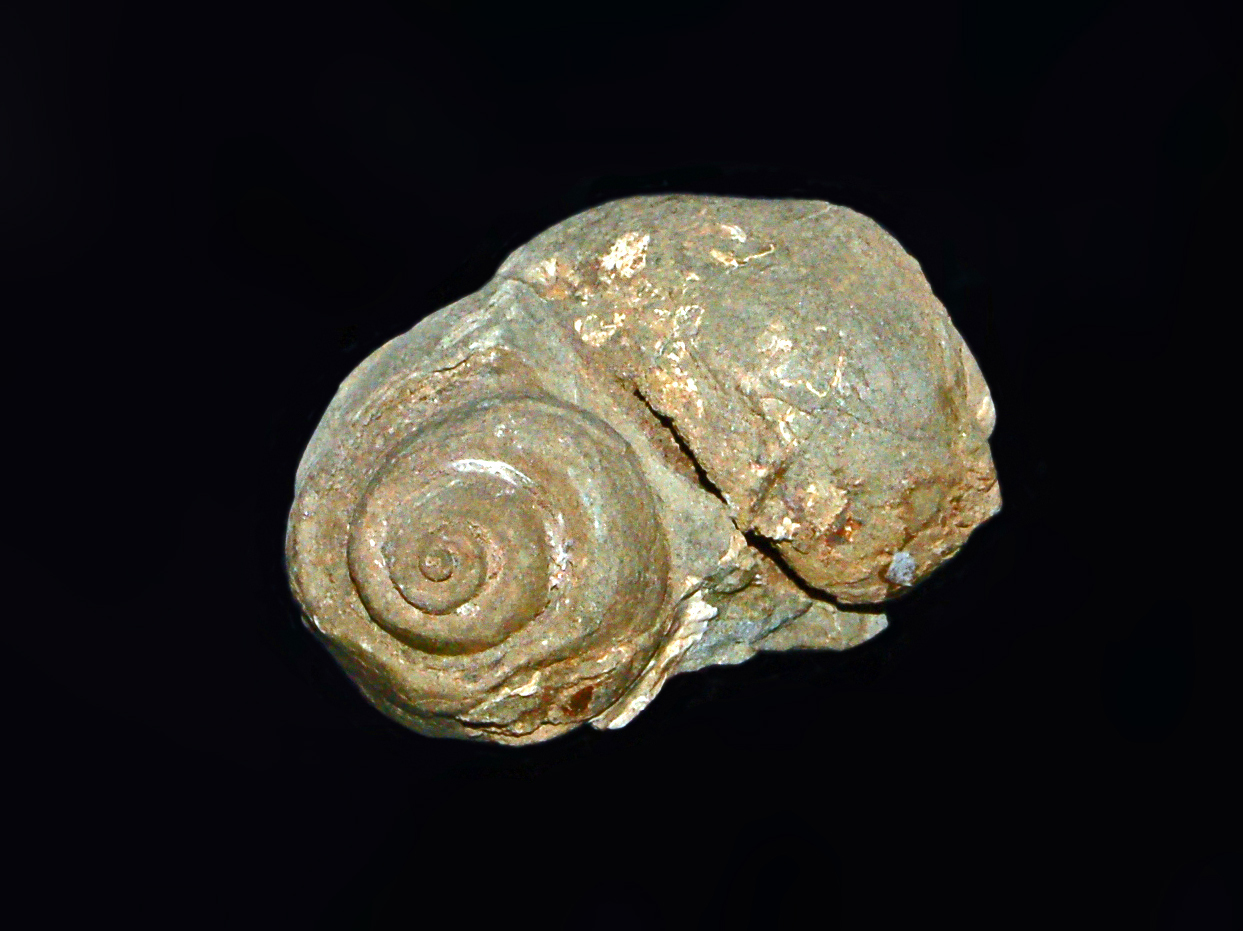
- Fossilized shell of the Jurassic-Miocene sea snail Ampullina
  †Ampullina
  - †Ampullina lepta
  - †Ampullina potens
- Amuletum
  - †Amuletum costata
  - †Amuletum costatum – tentative report
  - †Amuletum dumasensis
  - †Amuletum fasciolatum
  - †Amuletum limbatum
  - †Amuletum macnairyensis
  - †Amuletum macnairyensis torquatum
  - †Amuletum wadei
- †Anatimya
  - †Anatimya anteradiata
  - †Anatimya postsulcata
- Anatina
  - †Anatina jerseyensis – or unidentified comparable form
- †Anchura
  - †Anchura abrupta
  - †Anchura chapelvillensis
  - †Anchura coffea
  - †Anchura corniculata
  - †Anchura noakensis – tentative report
  - †Anchura substriata
- †Ancilla
  - †Ancilla acutula
- †Anisomyon
- †Anomalofusus
  - †Anomalofusus lemniscatus
  - †Anomalofusus subnodosus
- †Anomia
  - †Anomia argentaria
  - †Anomia ornata
  - †Anomia tellinoides
- †Anomoeodus
  - †Anomoeodus latidens – type locality for species
  - †Anomoeodus mississippiensis – type locality for species
  - †Anomoeodus phaseolus
- Anteglosia
  - †Anteglosia tennesseensis
- †Anteglossia
- †Antillocaprina
- †Aphrodina
  - †Aphrodina eufaulensis – tentative report
  - †Aphrodina regia
  - †Aphrodina tippana
- †Arca
  - †Arca rostellata
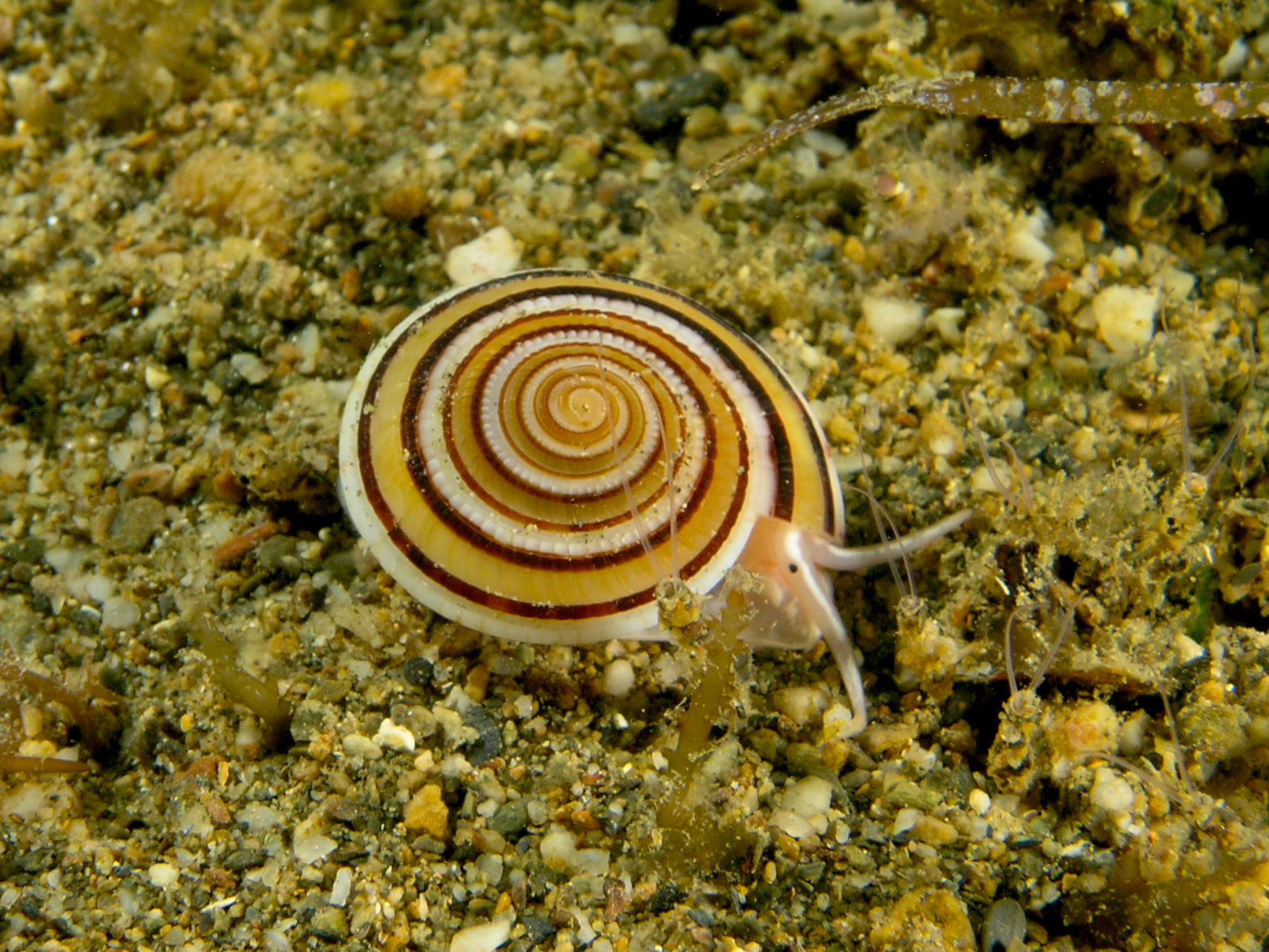
- A living Architectonica staircase shell sea snail
  Architectonica
- †Arcoscalpellum
  - †Arcoscalpellum bakeri
  - †Arcoscalpellum campus
  - †Arcoscalpellum withersi
- †Arctostrea
  - †Arctostrea falacata
- Arrhoges
  - †Arrhoges plenacosta
- †Ascaulocardium
  - †Ascaulocardium armatum
- Astarte
  - †Astarte culebrensis
- Ataphrus
  - †Ataphrus griffini
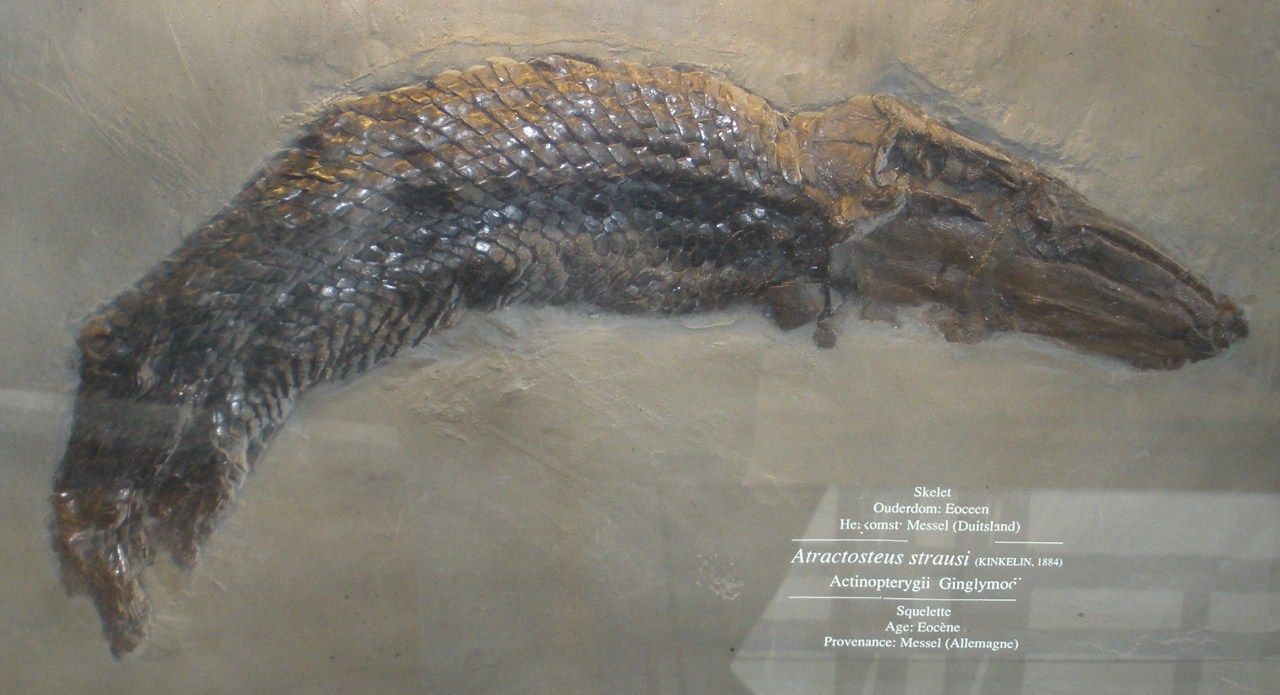
- Fossilized skeleton of the gar Atractosteus
  Atractosteus
- †Atreta
  - †Atreta melleni

== B ==
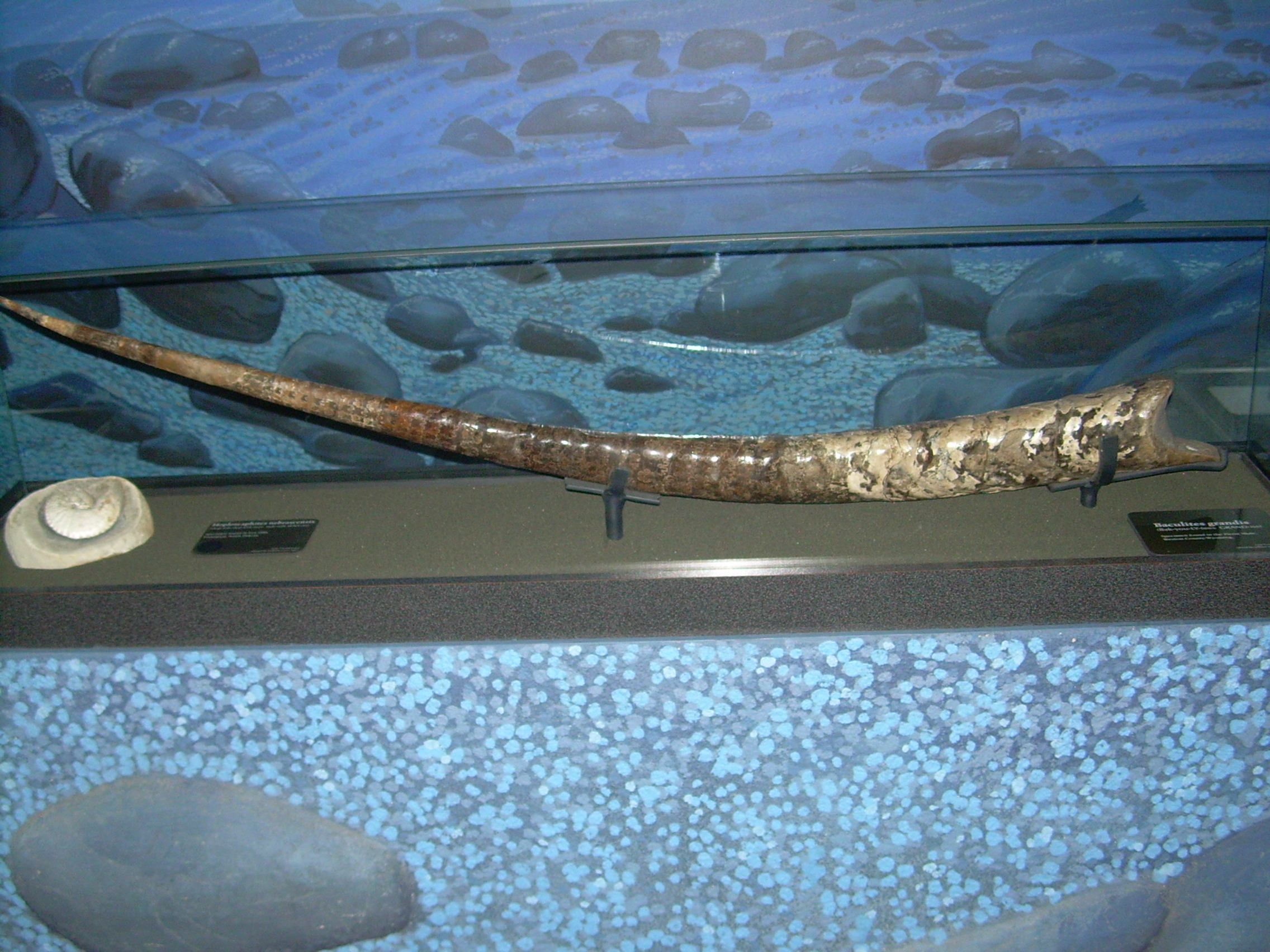
- Fossilized shell of the Late Cretaceous ammonoid cephalopod Baculites
  †Baculites
  - †Baculites arculus
  - †Baculites capensis
  - †Baculites grandis – or unidentified comparable form
  - †Baculites tippahensis
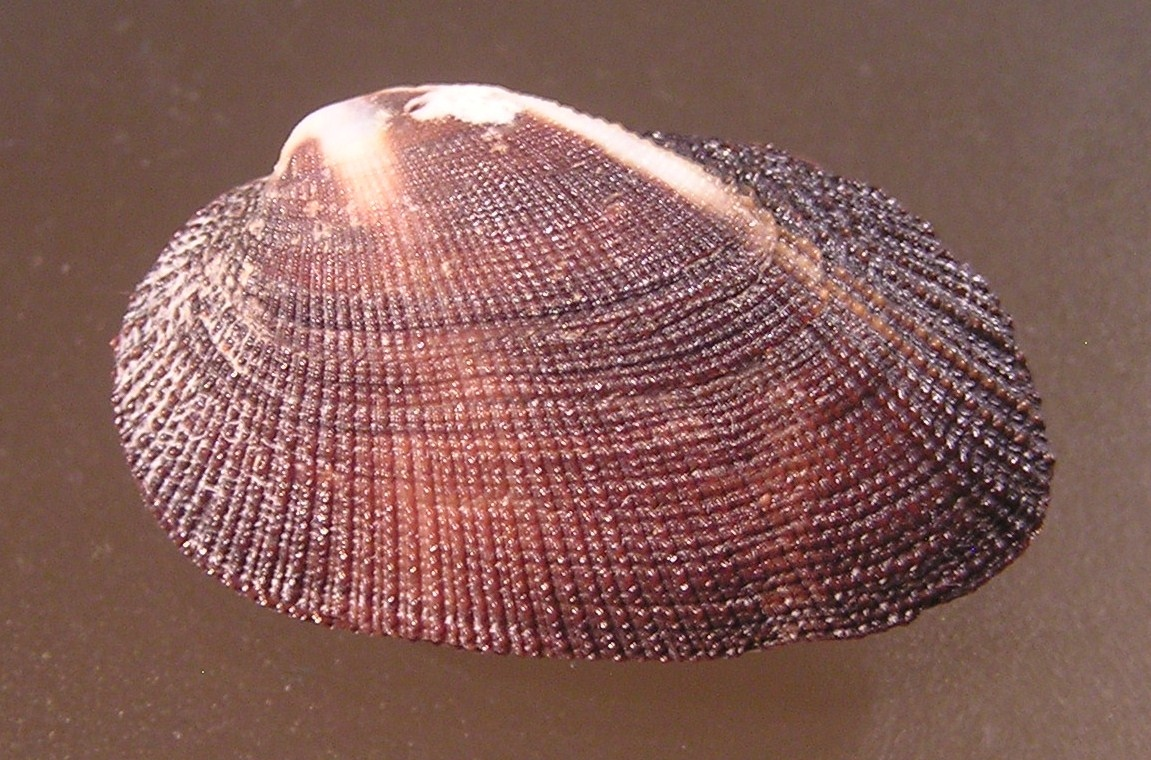
- Shell of a Barbatia, or bearded ark clam
  Barbatia
  - †Barbatia carolinensis
  - †Barbatia lintea
- †Bathytormus
  - †Bathytormus pteropsis
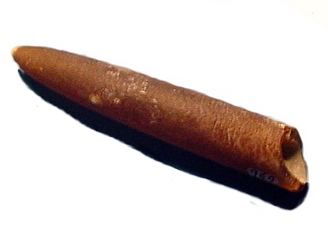
- Fossilized guard of the Late Cretaceous belemnoid cephalopod Belemnitella
  †Belemnitella
  - †Belemnitella americana
- †Bellifusus
  - †Bellifusus angulicostatus
  - †Bellifusus curvicostatus
  - †Bellifusus curvicostatus crenulatus
  - †Bellifusus spinosus
- †Belliscala
  - †Belliscala lirata
  - †Belliscala nodosa
  - †Belliscala rockensis
- †Beretra
  - †Beretra gracilis
  - †Beretra preclara
  - †Beretra ripleyana
- Bernaya
  - †Bernaya mississippiensis
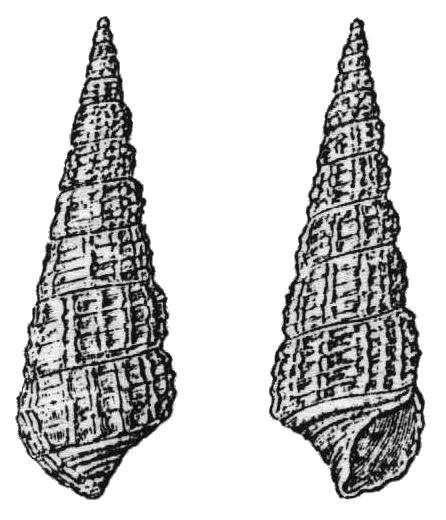
- Illustration of the shell in multiple views of a Bittium cerith sea snail
  Bittium – tentative report
- †Bizarrus
  - †Bizarrus abnormalis
- †Boehmoceras
  - †Boehmoceras arculus
- Botula
  - †Botula carolinensis
  - †Botula ripleyana
- Brachidontes
- †Brachylepas
  - †Brachylepas angulosa
- †Breviarca
  - †Breviarca umbonata
- †Buccinopsis
  - †Buccinopsis crassicostata
  - †Buccinopsis crassus
  - †Buccinopsis dorothiella
  - †Buccinopsis solida
- Bulla – tentative report
- †Bullopsis
  - †Bullopsis cretacea
  - †Bullopsis demersus

== C ==
- Cadulus
  - †Cadulus obnutus
- Caestocorbula
  - †Caestocorbula crassaplica
  - †Caestocorbula crassiplica
  - †Caestocorbula suffalciata
  - †Caestocorbula terramaria
- †Calliomphalus
  - †Calliomphalus americanus
  - †Calliomphalus argenteus
  - †Calliomphalus conanti
  - †Calliomphalus microcancelli
  - †Calliomphalus nudus
  - †Calliomphalus paucispirilus
  - †Calliomphalus tuberculosus
- Calyptraea
- †Camptonectes
  - †Camptonectes bellisculptus
  - †Camptonectes berryi
  - †Camptonectes bubonis
  - †Camptonectes burlingtonensis
- Cantharus
  - †Cantharus lemniscatus
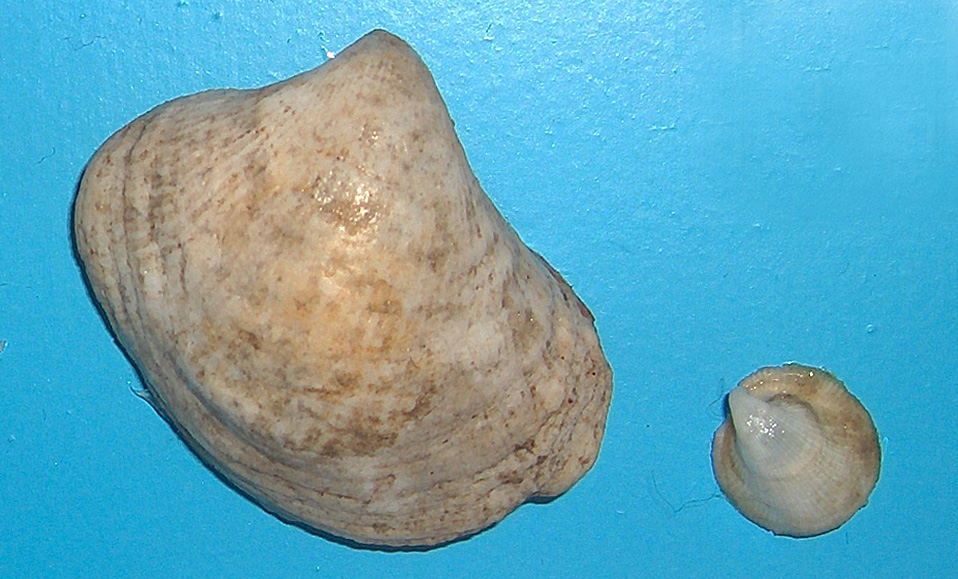
- Shells of modern Capulus cap sea snails
  Capulus
  - †Capulus cuthandensis
  - †Capulus spangleri
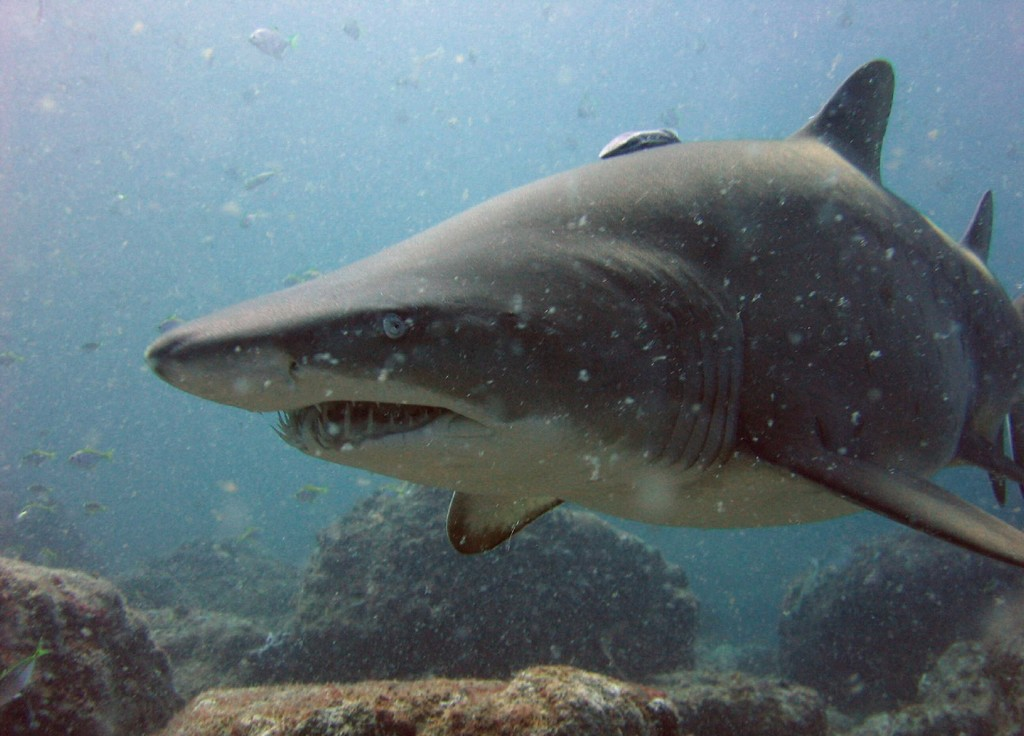
- A living Carcharias sand tiger shark
  Carcharias – tentative report
- Cardium
  - †Cardium spillmani
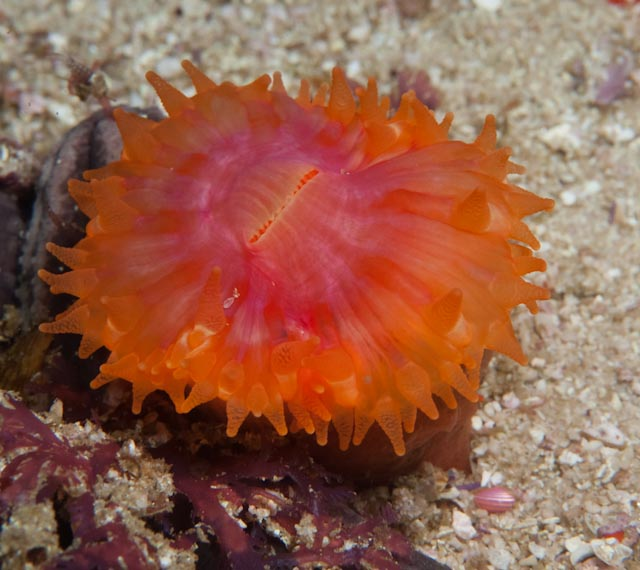
- A living Caryophyllia solitary coral
  Caryophyllia
  - †Caryophyllia konincki – type locality for species
- †Catopygus
  - †Catopygus mississippiensis – type locality for species
- †Caveola
  - †Caveola acuta
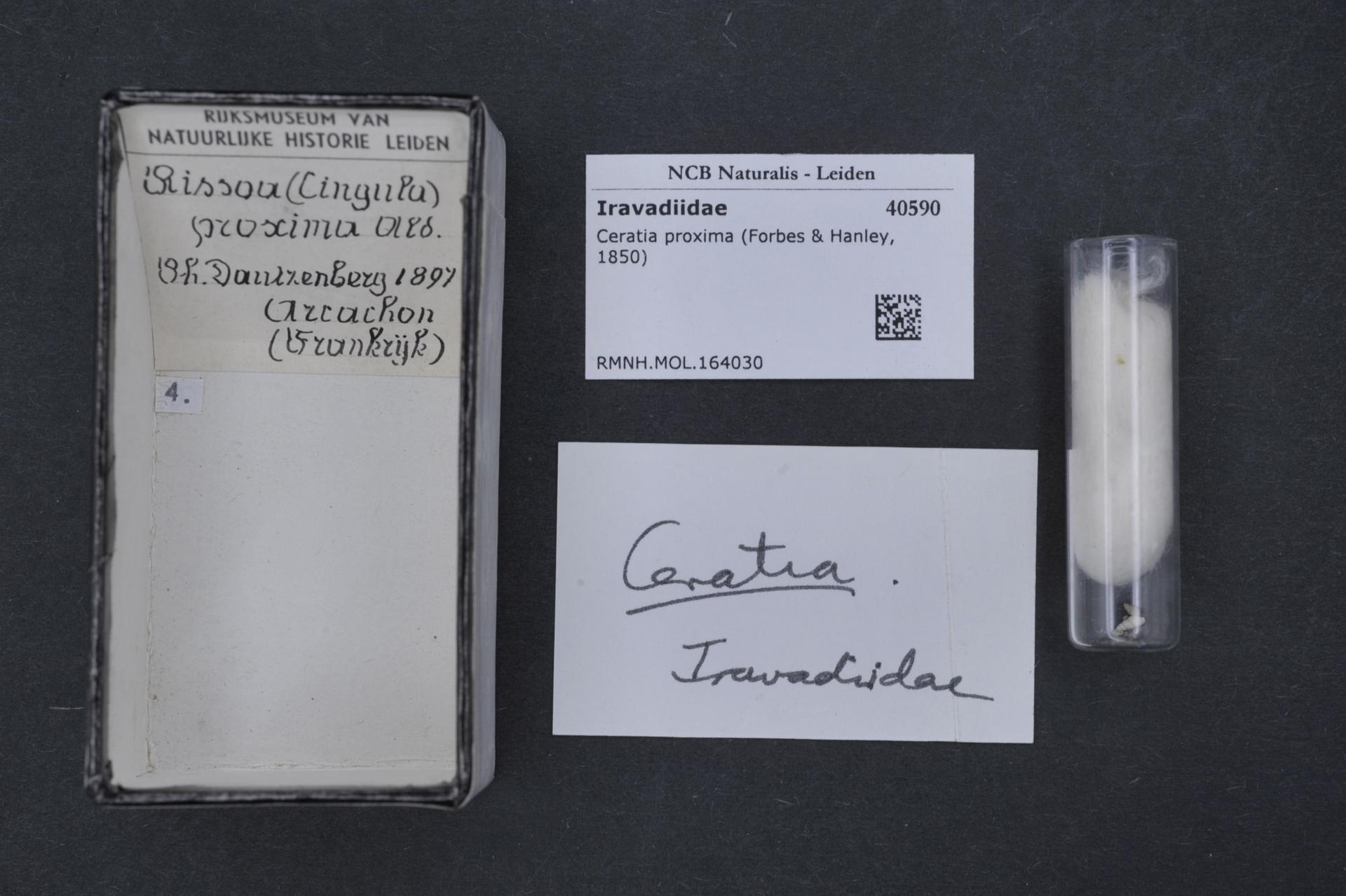
- Ceratia
  Ceratia
  - †Ceratia cylindrata
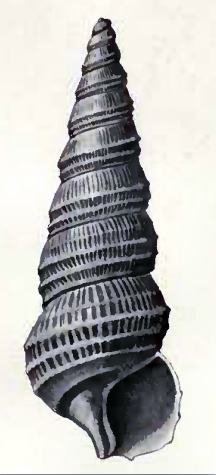
- Illustration of a shell of a Cerithiella cerith sea snail
  Cerithiella
  - †Cerithiella – type locality for species – informal
  - †Cerithiella aequalirata
  - †Cerithiella chapelvillensis
  - †Cerithiella nodoliratum
  - †Cerithiella semirugatum
- †Cerithioderma
  - †Cerithioderma nodosa
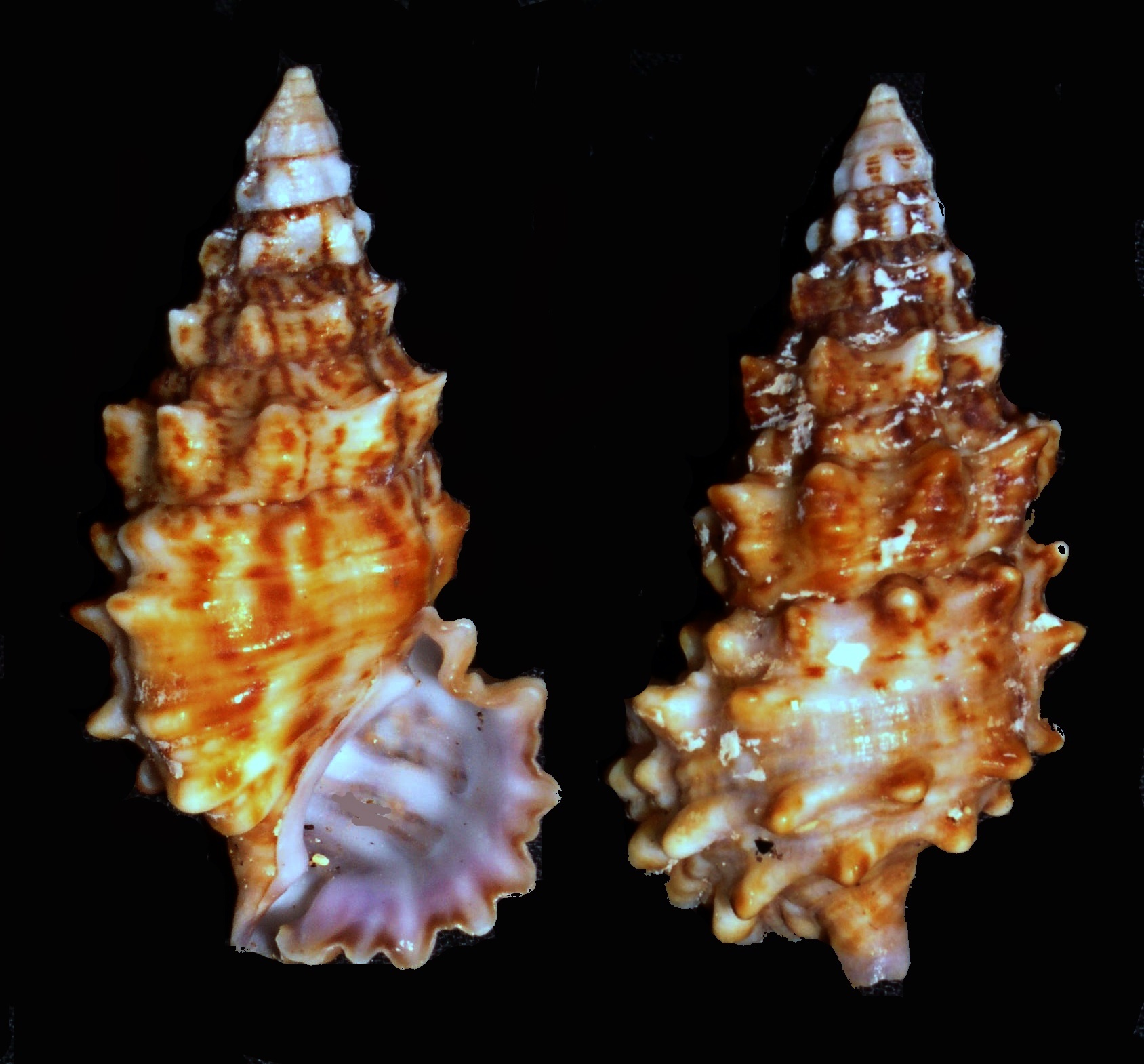
- Two views of a Cerithium cerith sea snail
  Cerithium
  - †Cerithium binodosus
  - †Cerithium cretaceus
  - †Cerithium nodoliratum
  - †Cerithium robustus
  - †Cerithium semirugatum
  - †Cerithium weeksi
- Chlamys
  - †Chlamys mississippensis
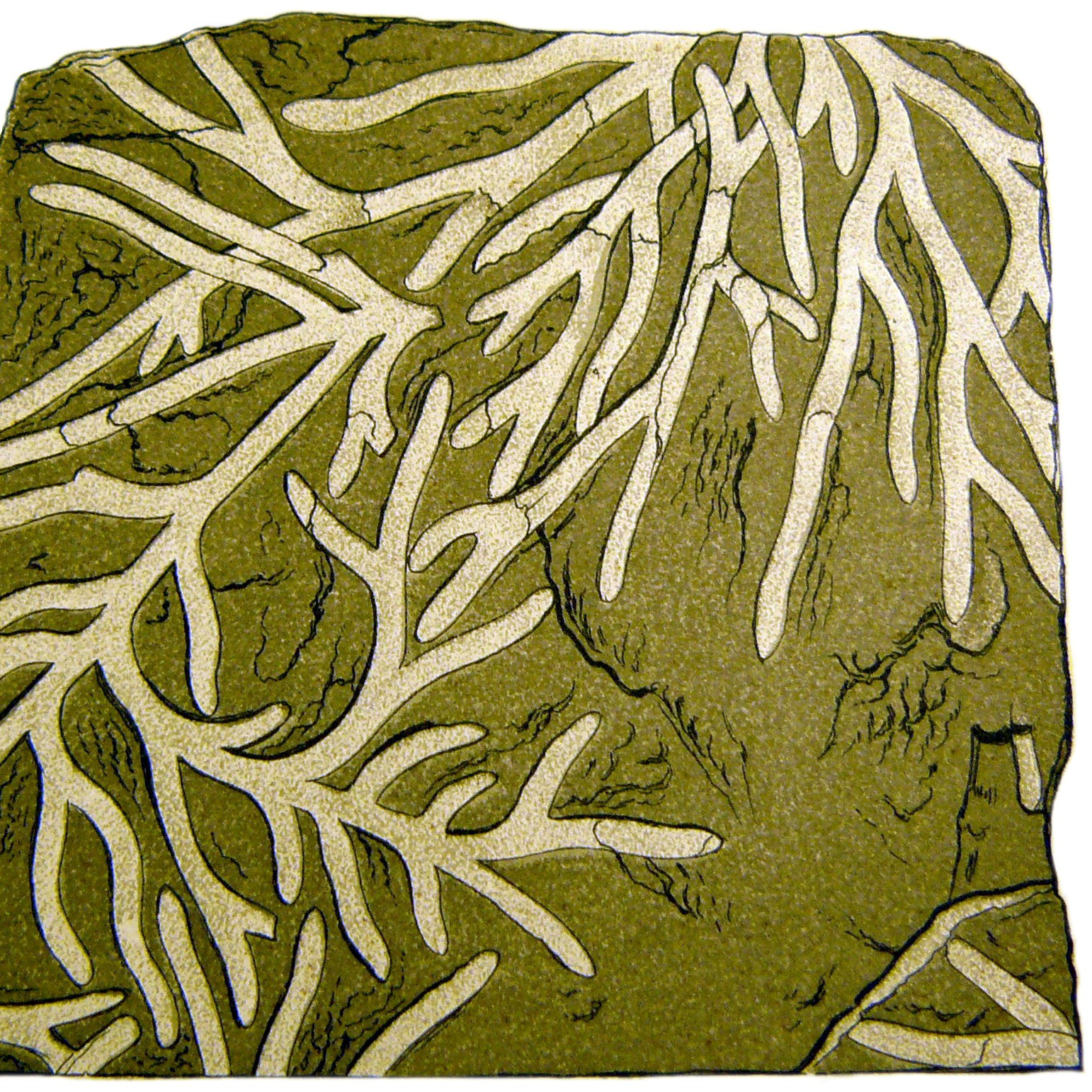
- Illustration of a fossil of the Cambrian-modern burrow ichnogenus Chondrites
  †Chondrites
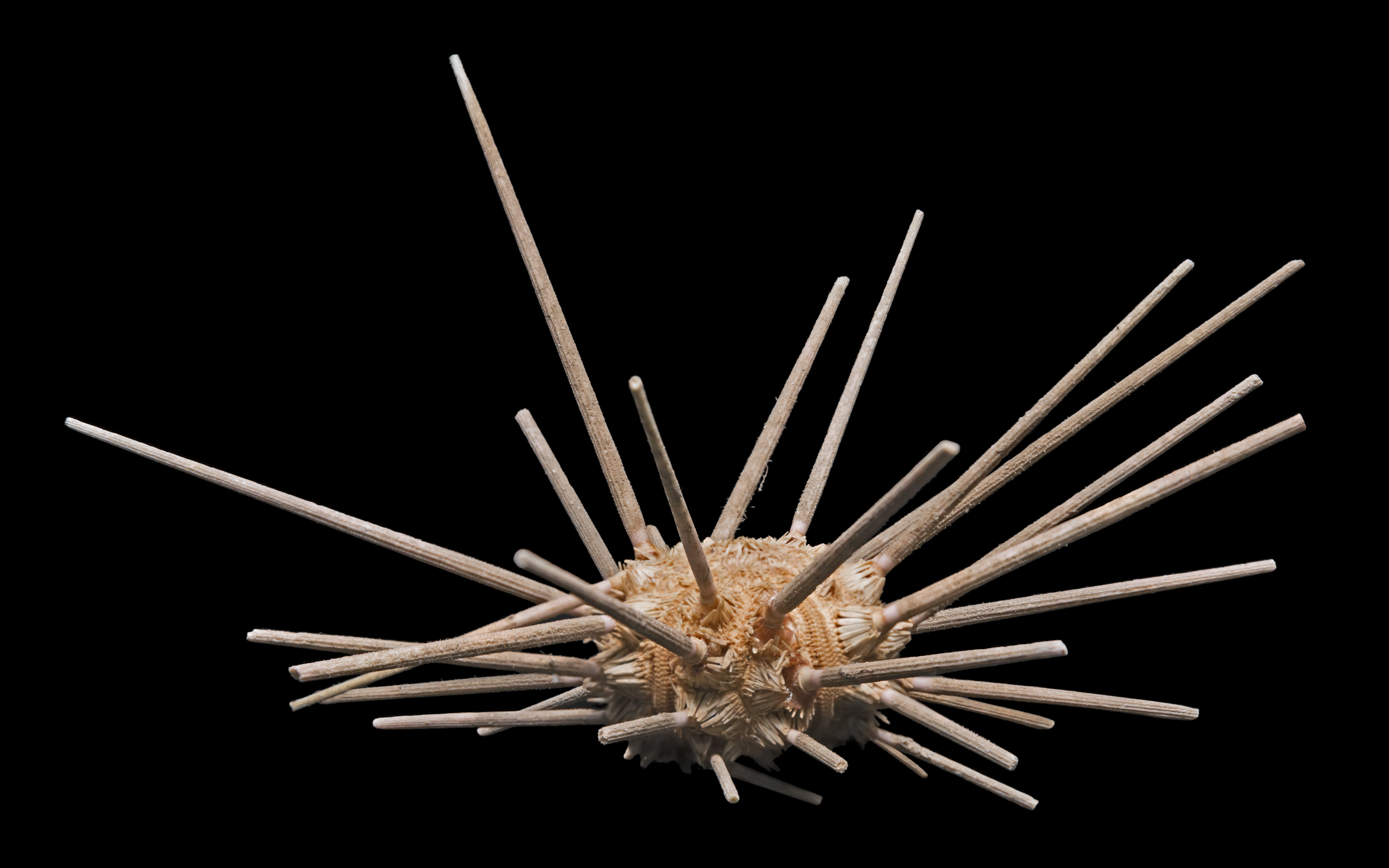
- Shell and spines of a Cidaris sea urchin
  Cidaris
  - †Cidaris wahalakensis
- †Clarkiella
  - †Clarkiella hemispherica
- Clavagella
- †Clavipholas
  - †Clavipholas pectorosa
- Cliona
- †Clisocolus
  - †Clisocolus concentricum
- †Coahuilites – tentative report
- †Colombellina
  - †Colombellina americana
  - †Colombellina cancellata
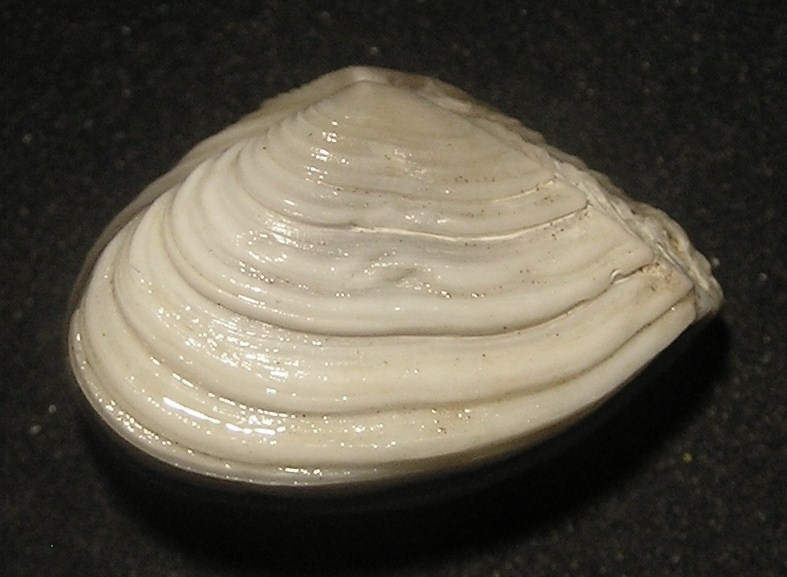
- Shell of a Corbula basket clam
  Corbula
  - †Corbula torta
- †Costellacesta
  - †Costellacesta riddlei
- Crassatella
  - †Crassatella hodgei
  - †Crassatella neusensis
  - †Crassatella roodensis
  - †Crassatella vadosa
- Crenella
  - †Crenella elegantula
  - †Crenella serica
- †Creonella
  - †Creonella subangulata
  - †Creonella triplicata
  - †Creonella turretiforma
- †Cretiscalpellum
  - †Cretiscalpellum hardnedi
  - †Cretiscalpellum vallum
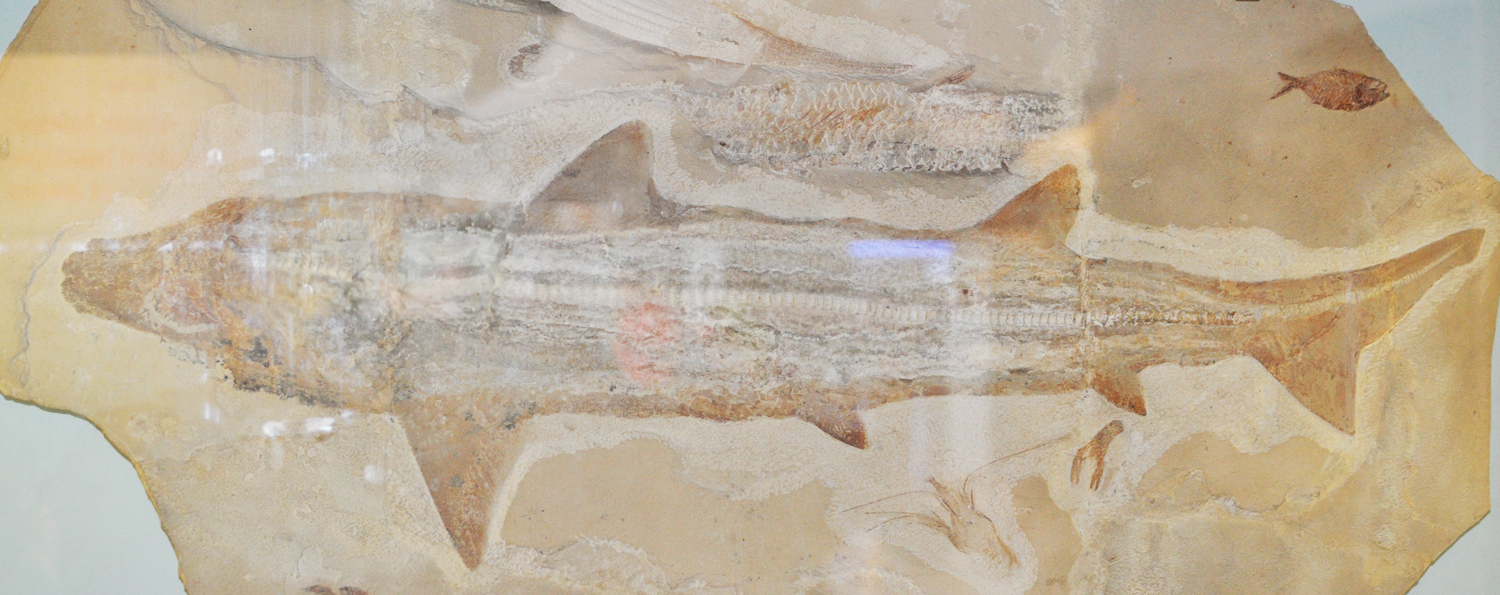
- Fossil of the Early Cretaceous-Eocene shark Cretolamna
  †Cretolamna
  - †Cretolamna appendiculata
- †Cristipluma – type locality for genus
  - †Cristipluma mississippiensis – type locality for species
- Crucibulum
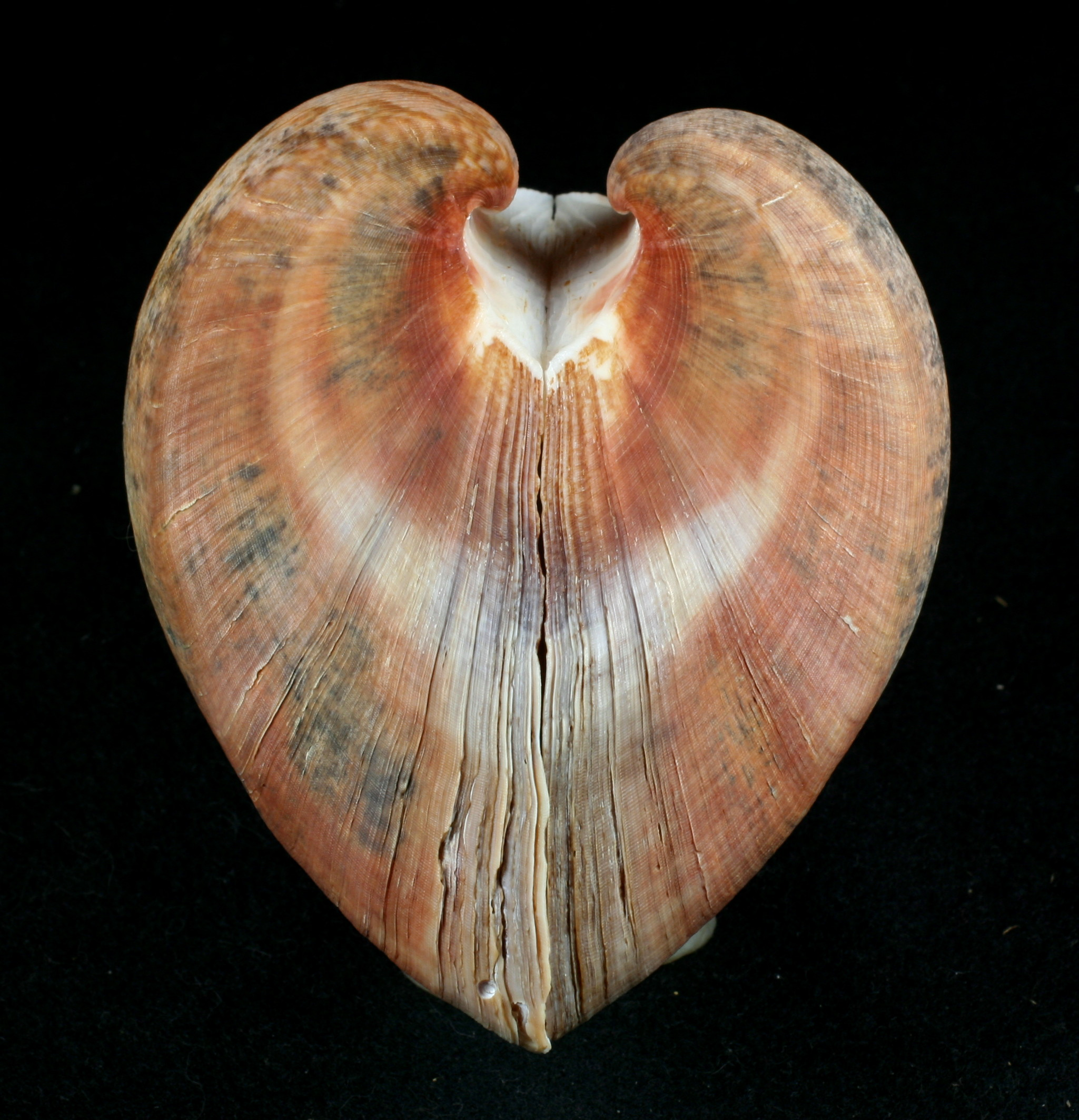
- Shell of a Cucullaea, or false ark shell
  Cucullaea
  - †Cucullaea capax
  - †Cucullaea carolinensis
  - †Cucullaea littlei
  - †Cucullaea vulgans
  - †Cucullaea wadei – tentative report
- †Cuna
  - †Cuna texana
- Cuspidaria
  - †Cuspidaria grandis
  - †Cuspidaria jerseyensis – or unidentified comparable form
- †Cyclorisma
  - †Cyclorisma parva
- Cylichna
  - †Cylichna diversilirata
  - †Cylichna incisa
  - †Cylichna intermissia
  - †Cylichna secalina
- †Cylindrotruncatum
  - †Cylindrotruncatum demersum
- †Cymbophora
  - †Cymbophora appressa
  - †Cymbophora berryi
  - †Cymbophora lintea
- †Cymella
  - †Cymella bella
  - †Cymella ironensis – tentative report
- †Cyprimeria
  - †Cyprimeria alta
  - †Cyprimeria depressa

== D ==
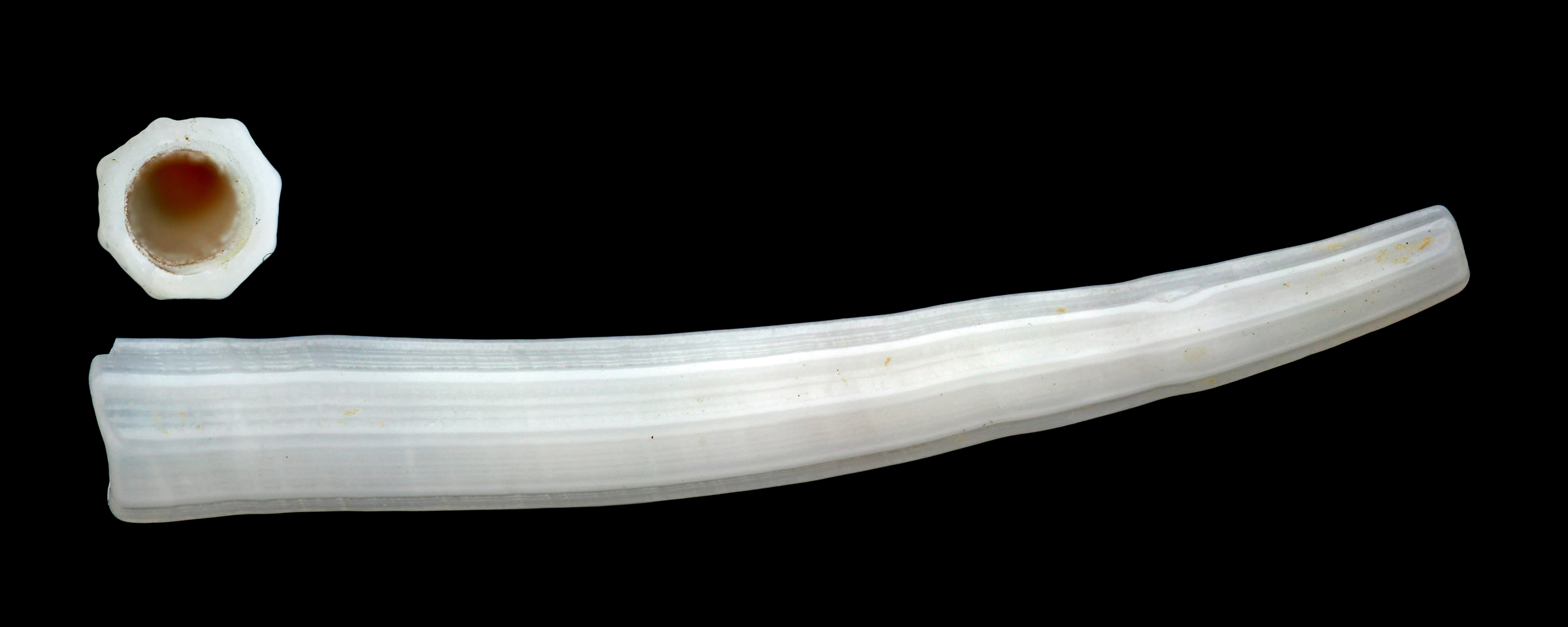
Shell of a Dentalium tusk shell

- †Dakoticancer
  - †Dakoticancer australis
- †Damesia
  - †Damesia keownvillensis
- Dasmosmilia
  - †Dasmosmilia kochii
- †Dentalium
  - †Dentalium leve
- †Deussenia
  - †Deussenia bellalirata
  - †Deussenia ripleyana
  - †Deussenia travisana – or unidentified comparable form
- †Dhondtichlamys
  - †Dhondtichlamys venustus
- †Dictyaraea
- Dimya
  - †Dimya melleni
- †Diplomoceras
  - †Diplomoceras trabeatus
- †Dircella
  - †Dircella spillmani
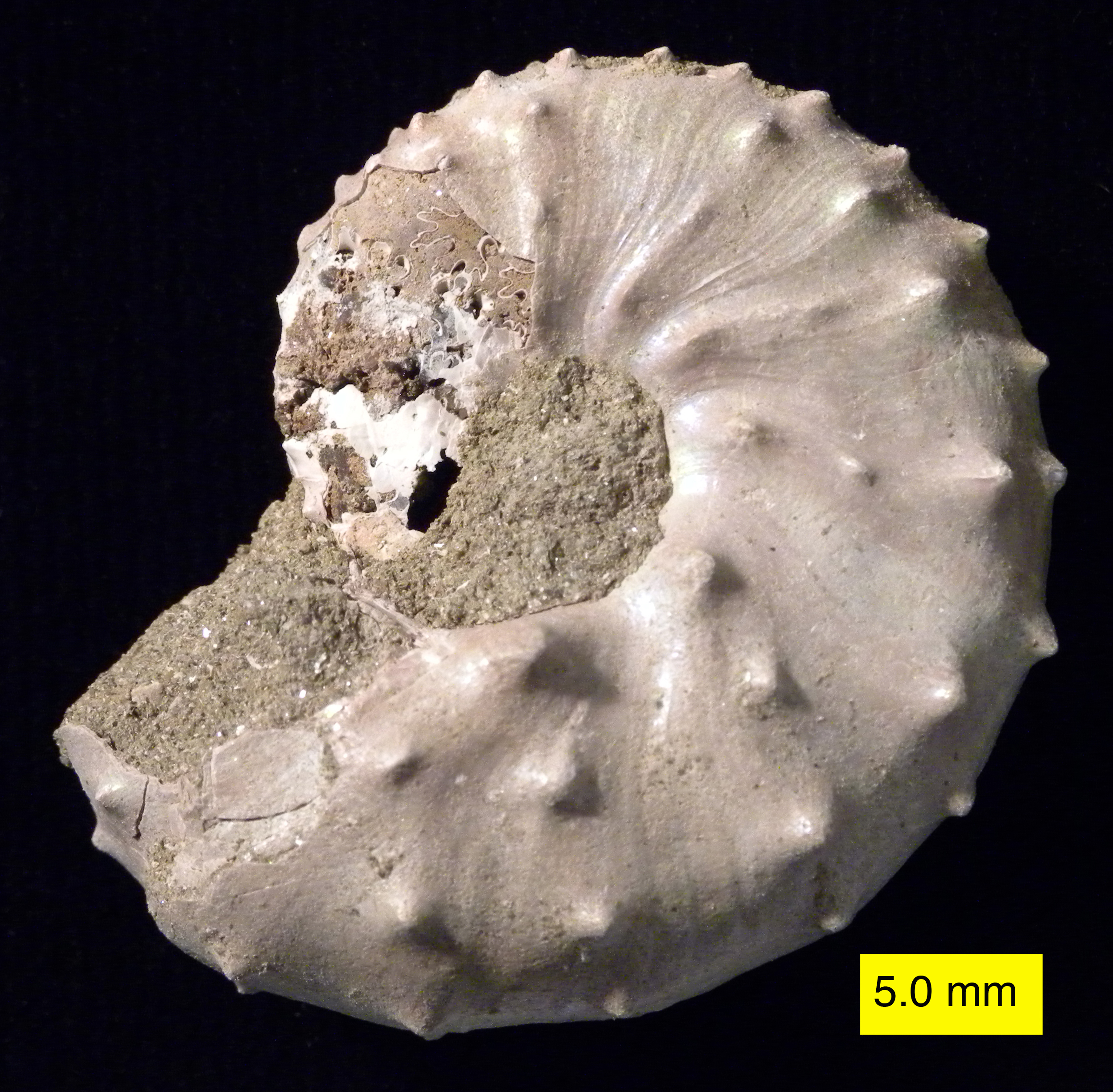
- Fossilized shell of the Late Cretaceous ammonoid cephalopod Discoscaphites
  †Discoscaphites
  - †Discoscaphites conradi
  - †Discoscaphites iris
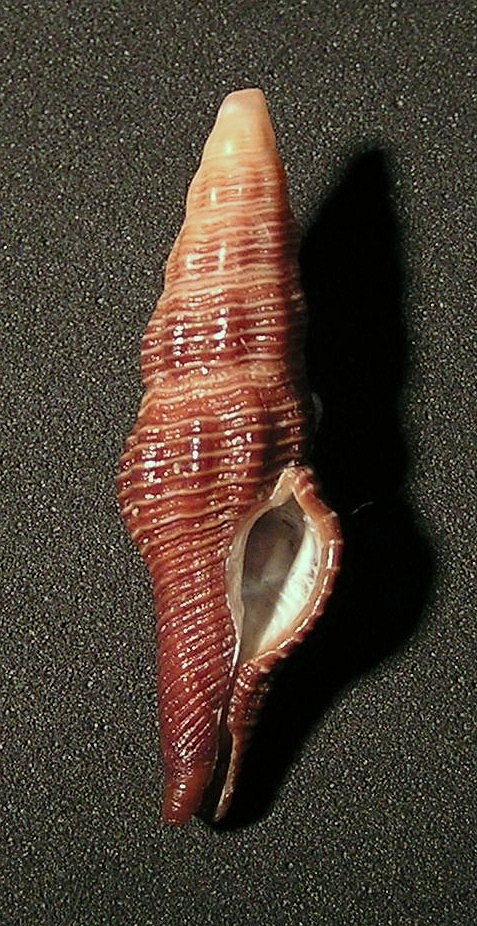
- Shell of a Dolicholatirus sea snail
  †Dolicholatirus
  - †Dolicholatirus torquatus
- †Drepanocheilus
- †Drepanochilus
  - †Drepanochilus triliratus
- †Drilluta
  - †Drilluta buboanus
  - †Drilluta distans
  - †Drilluta lemniscata
  - †Drilluta major

== E ==
- †Ecclesiogyra
  - †Ecclesiogyra heliclina
  - †Ecclesiogyra inflata
- †Echinimathilda
  - †Echinimathilda corona
  - †Echinimathilda microstriata
  - †Echinimathilda parvula
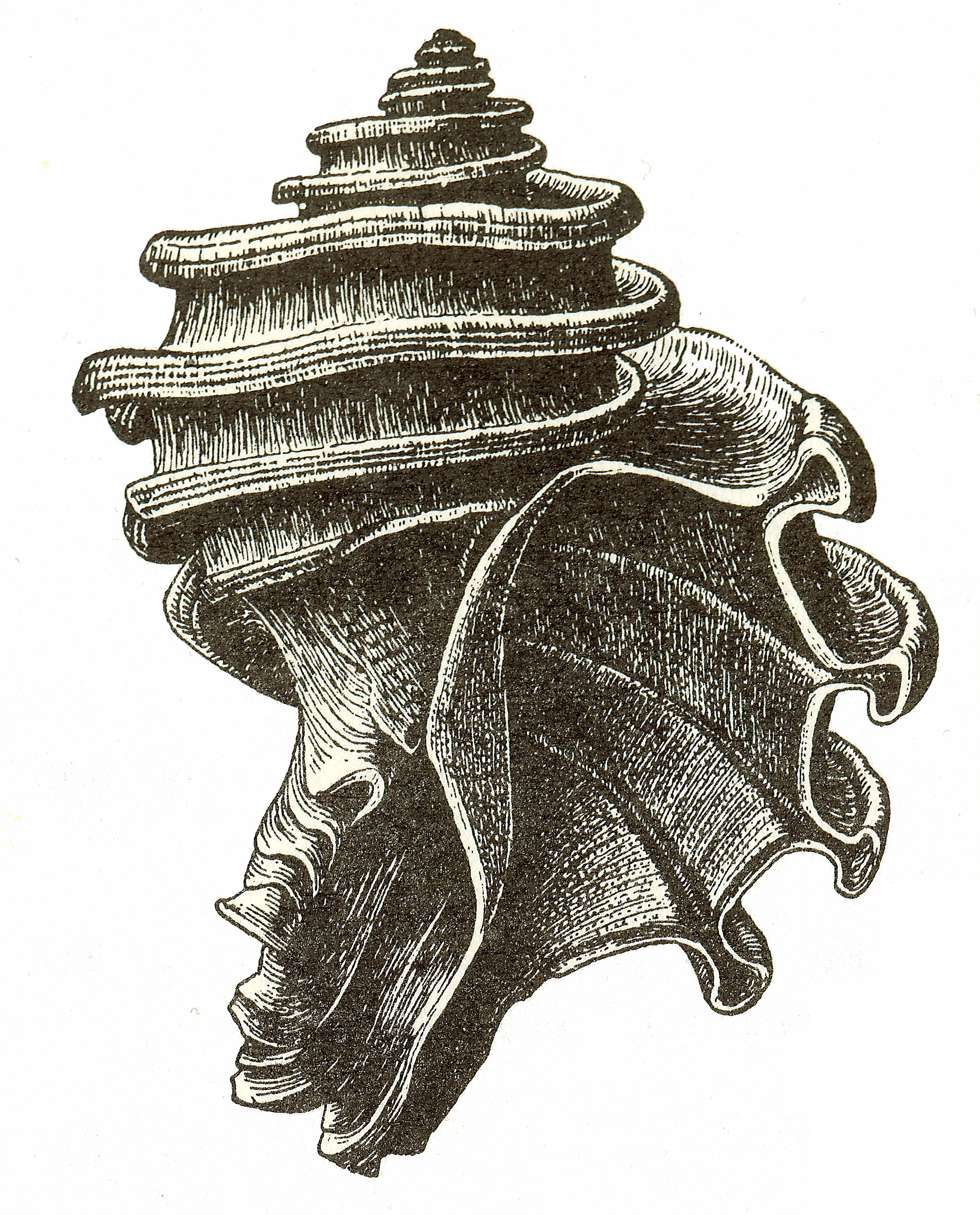
- Illustration of a fossilized shell of the Eocene-Pliocene murex sea snail Ecphora
  †Ecphora
  - †Ecphora proquadricostata
- †Ellipsoscapha
  - †Ellipsoscapha mortoni
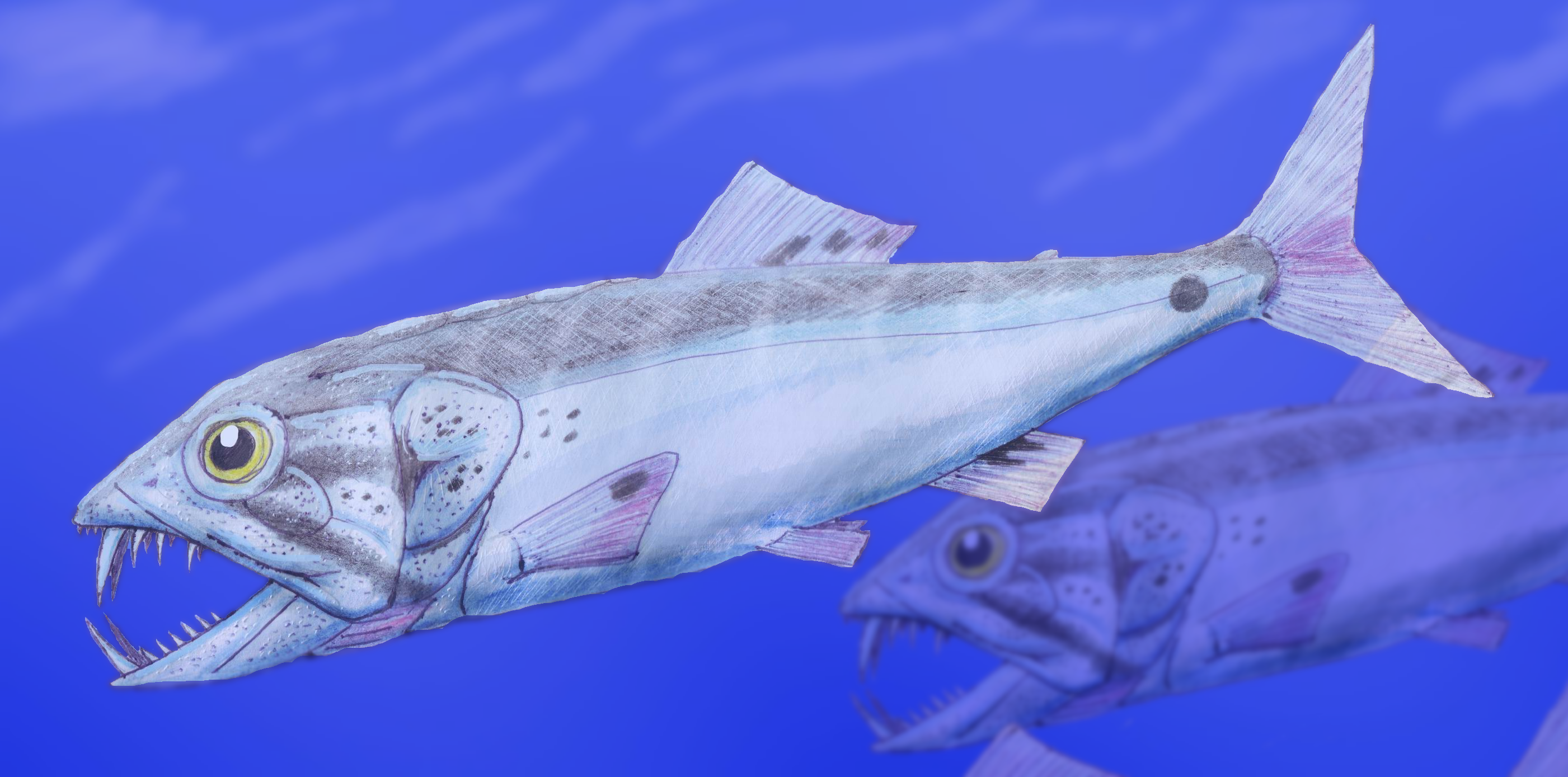
- Restoration of the Early Cretaceous-Eocene bony fish Enchodus, or the "saber-toothed herring"
  †Enchodus
  - †Enchodus petrosus
- †Endoptygma
  - †Endoptygma leprosa
- †Entomope
  - †Entomope ponderi
- †Eoacteon
  - †Eoacteon ithyocheilus
  - †Eoacteon linteus
- †Eoharpa
  - †Eoharpa sinuosa
- Eonavicula
  - †Eonavicula rostellata
- †Eothoracosaurus – type locality for genus
  - †Eothoracosaurus mississippiensis – type locality for species
- †Epitonium
  - †Epitonium faearium
  - †Epitonium sillimani
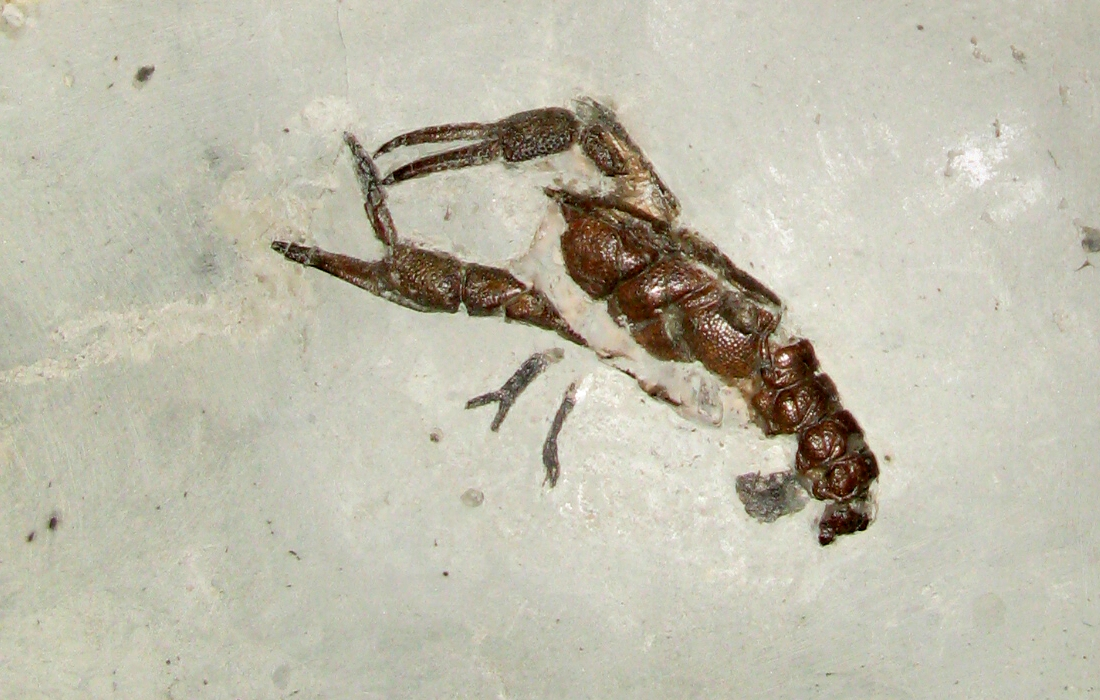
- Fossil of the crustacean Eryma
  †Eryma – report made of unidentified related form or using admittedly obsolete nomenclature
  - †Eryma flecta
- †Etea
  - †Etea carolinensis
- †Eubaculites
  - †Eubaculites carinatus
- †Eufistulana
  - †Eufistulana ripleyana
- †Eufistulina
  - †Eufistulina ripleyana
- †Eulima
  - †Eulima clara
  - †Eulima coffea
  - †Eulima gracilistylis
  - †Eulima laevigata
  - †Eulima monmouthensis
  - †Eulima spirala
- †Euspira
  - †Euspira rectilabrum
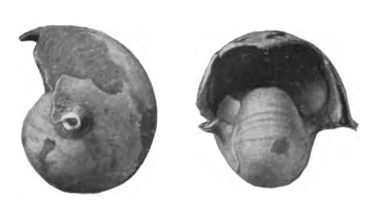
- Illustration in multiple views of a fossilized shell of the Late Jurassic-Miocene nautiloid cephalopod Eutrephoceras
  †Eutrephoceras
  - †Eutrephoceras dekayi
  - †Eutrephoceras perlatus
- †Exechocirsus
  - †Exechocirsus cowickeensis
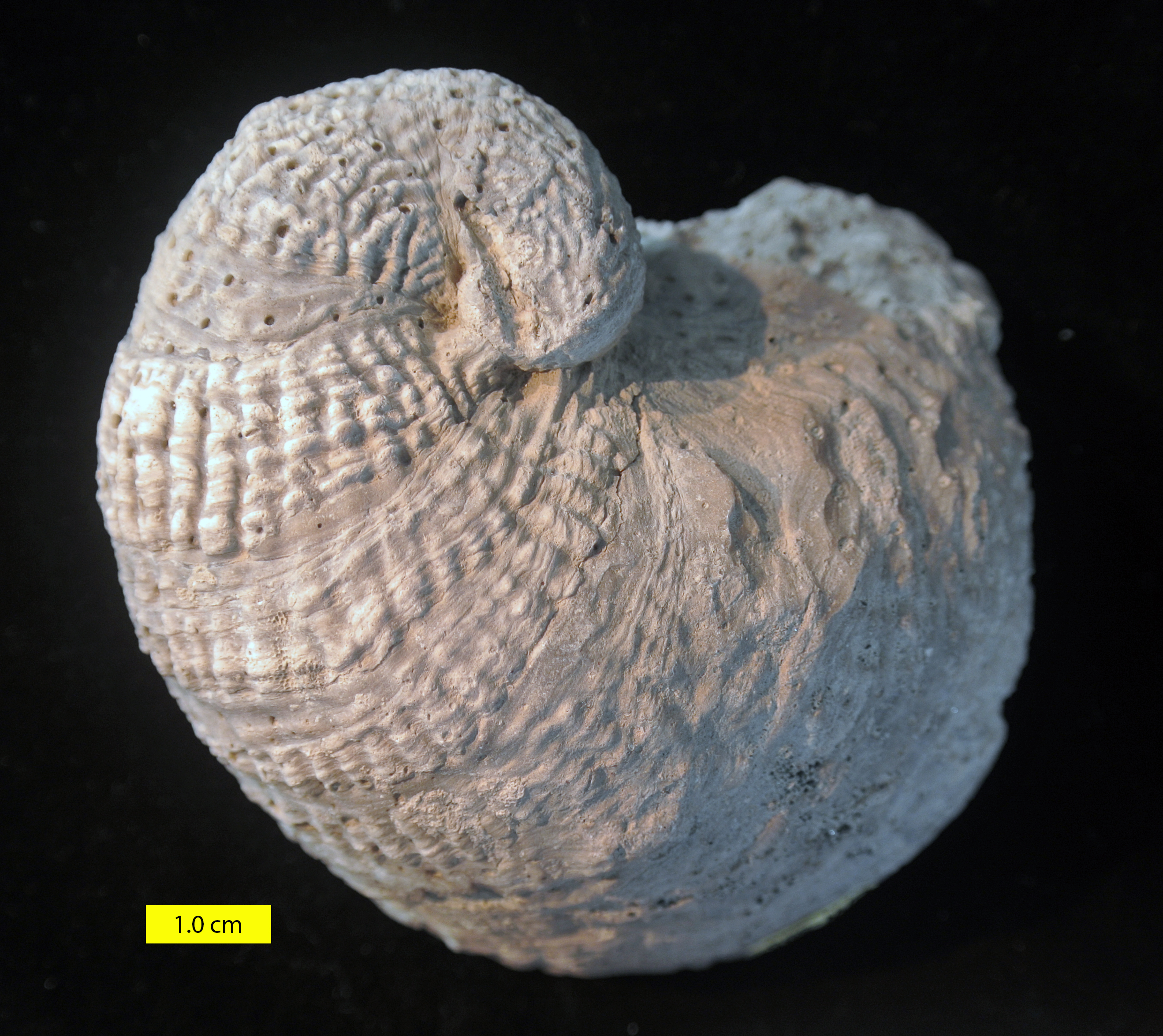
- Fossilized shell of the Jurassic-Cretaceous foam oyster Exogyra
  †Exogyra
  - †Exogyra costata
  - †Exogyra erraticostata
  - †Exogyra ponderosa
  - †Exogyra upatoiensis

== F ==
- †Flemingostrea
  - †Flemingostrea subspatula
- †Fulgerca
  - †Fulgerca attenuata – tentative report
  - †Fulgerca compressilirata
- †Fusimilis
  - †Fusimilis kummeli
  - †Fusimilis novemcostatus
  - †Fusimilis tippanus
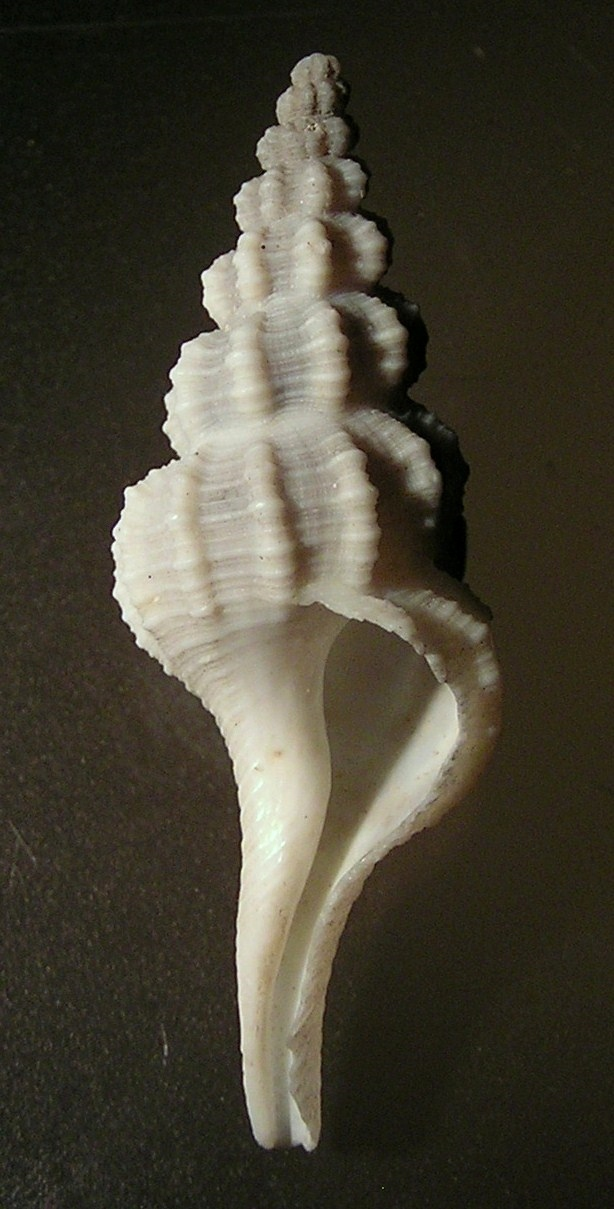
- shell of Fusinus inglorius
  Fusinus
  - †Fusinus macnairyensis

== G ==
- †Gegania
  - †Gegania bella
  - †Gegania bella prodiga
  - †Gegania mississippiensis
  - †Gegania parabella
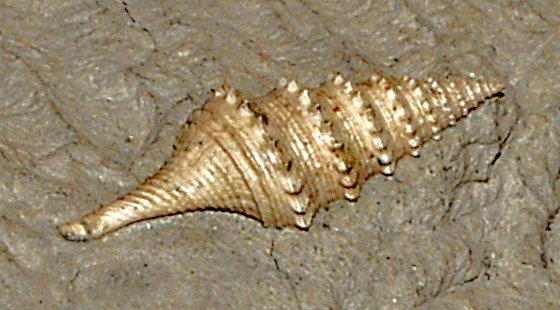
- Fossilized shell of a Gemmula sea snail, or gem turrid
  Gemmula
  - †Gemmula cretacea
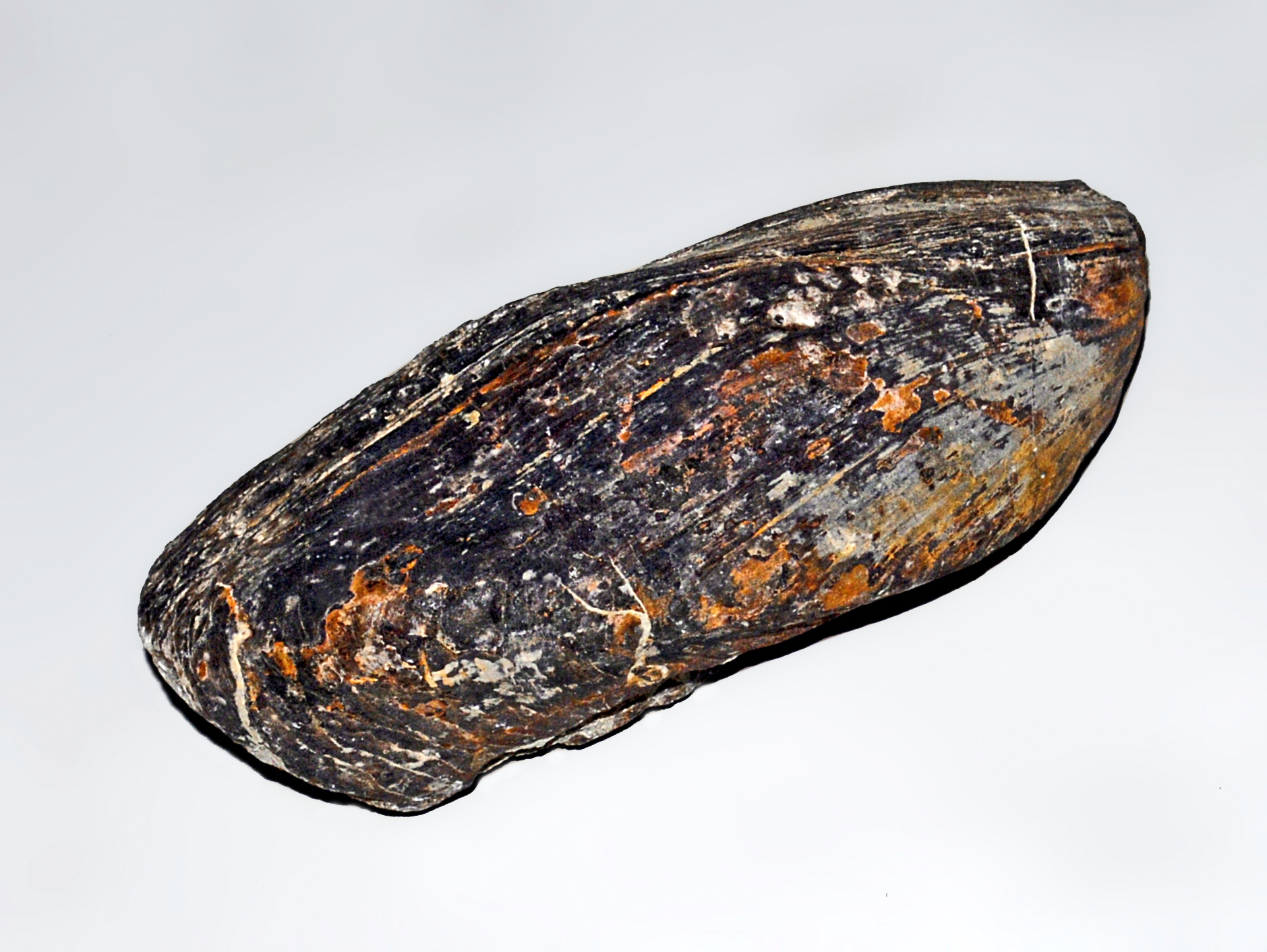
- Fossilized shell of the Carboniferous-Eocene bivalve Gervillia
  †Gervillia
- †Gervilliopsis
  - †Gervilliopsis ensiformis
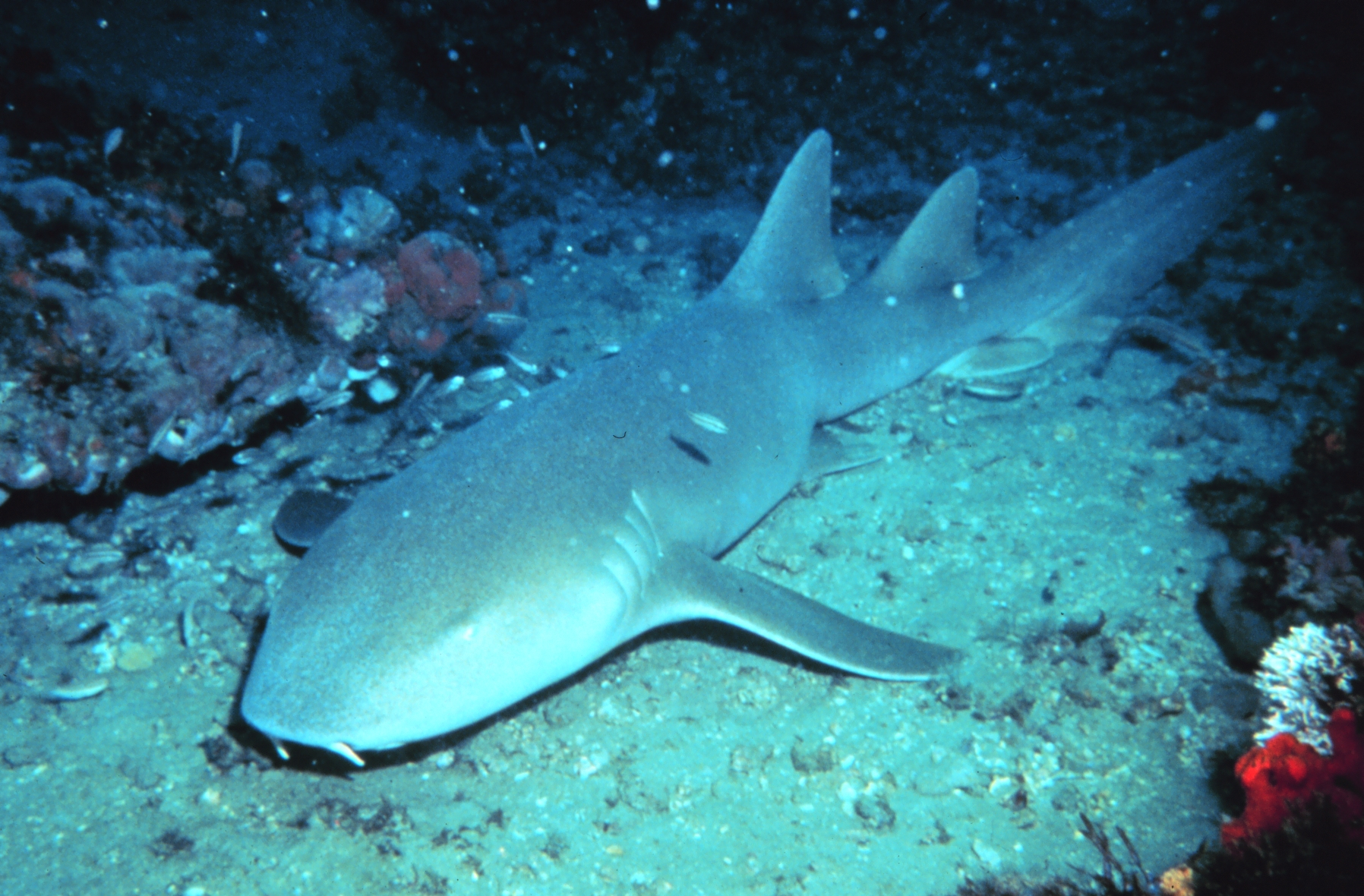
- A living Ginglymostoma nurse shark
  Ginglymostoma
  - †Ginglymostoma globidens
- Glossus
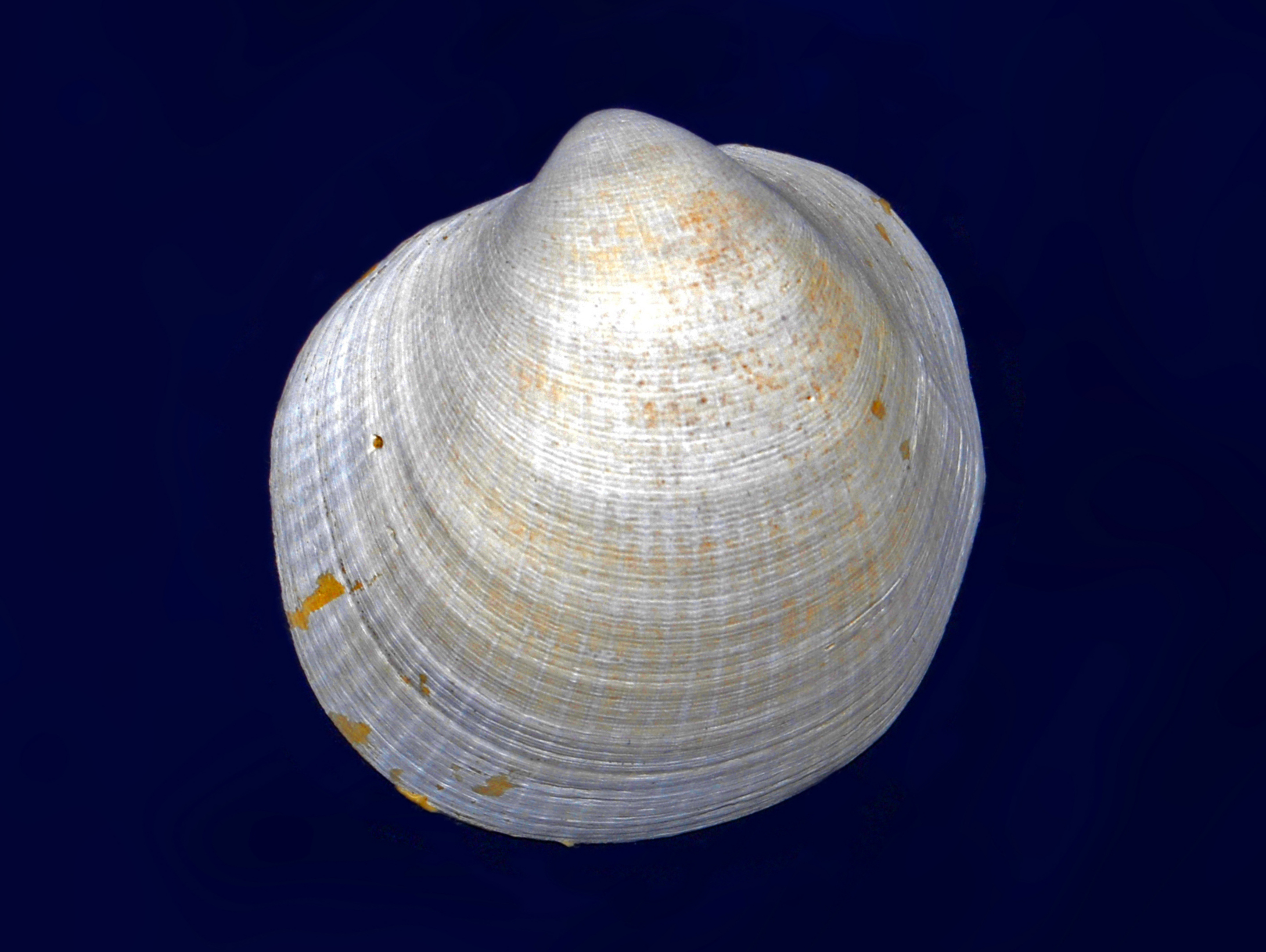
- Fossilized shell of a Glycymeris, or bittersweet clam
  Glycymeris
  - †Glycymeris microsulci
  - †Glycymeris rotundata
  - †Glycymeris whiteleyensis
- †Glyptoxoceras
- †Goniocylichna
  - †Goniocylichna bisculpturata
  - †Goniocylichna elongata
- †Graciliala
  - †Graciliala calcaris
  - †Graciliala decemlirata
  - †Graciliala johnsoni
- †Granocardium
  - †Granocardium dumosum
  - †Granocardium kuemmeli
  - †Granocardium kummeli
  - †Granocardium lowei
  - †Granocardium tippananum
  - †Granocardium tippanum
- †Granosolarium
  - †Granosolarium coffea
- †Graphidula
  - †Graphidula melanopsis
  - †Graphidula multicostata
  - †Graphidula terebriformis
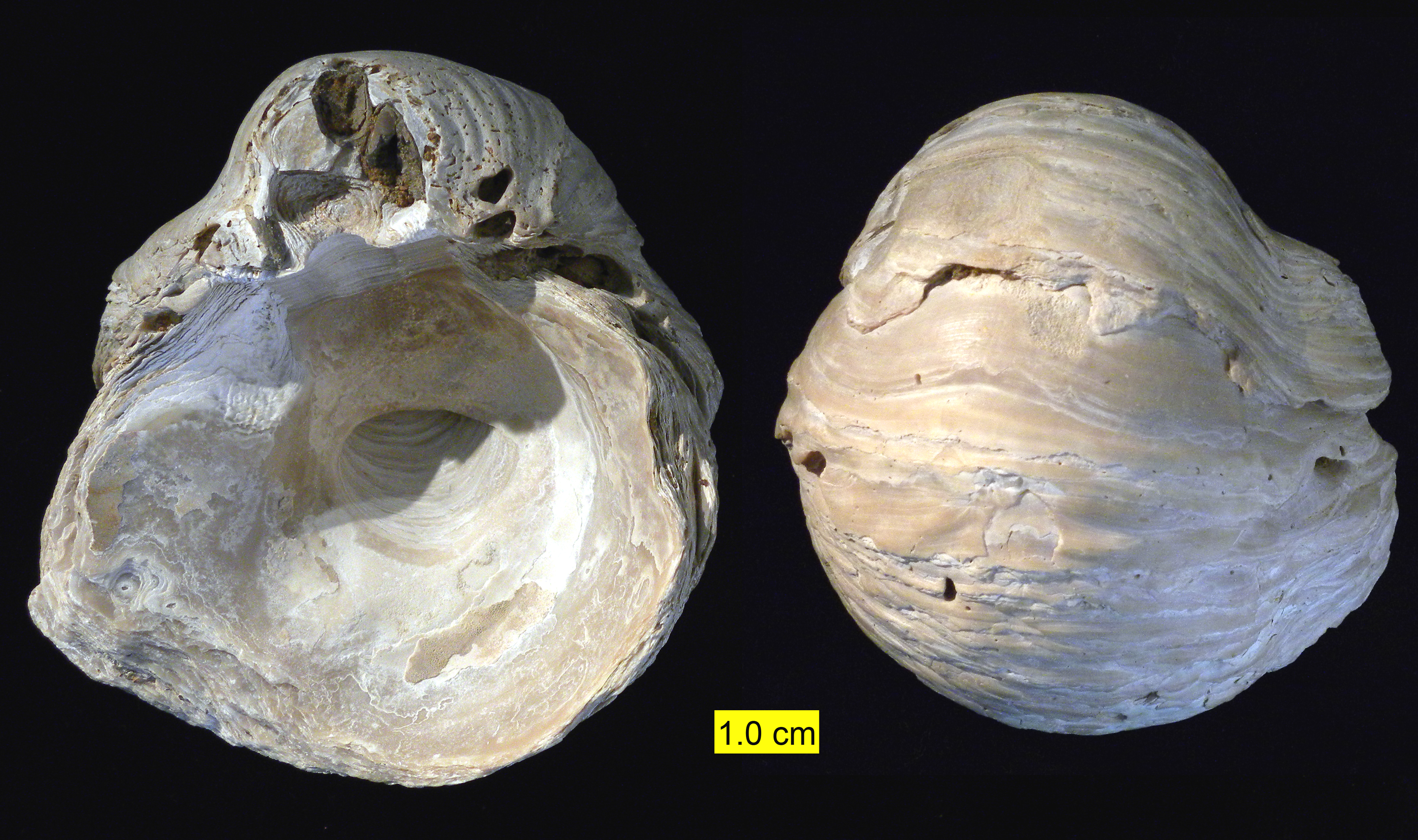
- Interior and exterior of a fossilized shell of the Late Triassic-Eocene marine bivalve Gryphaea
  †Gryphaea
  - †Gryphaea convexa
- †Gryphaeostrea
  - †Gryphaeostrea vomer
- †Gymnentome
  - †Gymnentome canalis
  - †Gymnentome unicarinata
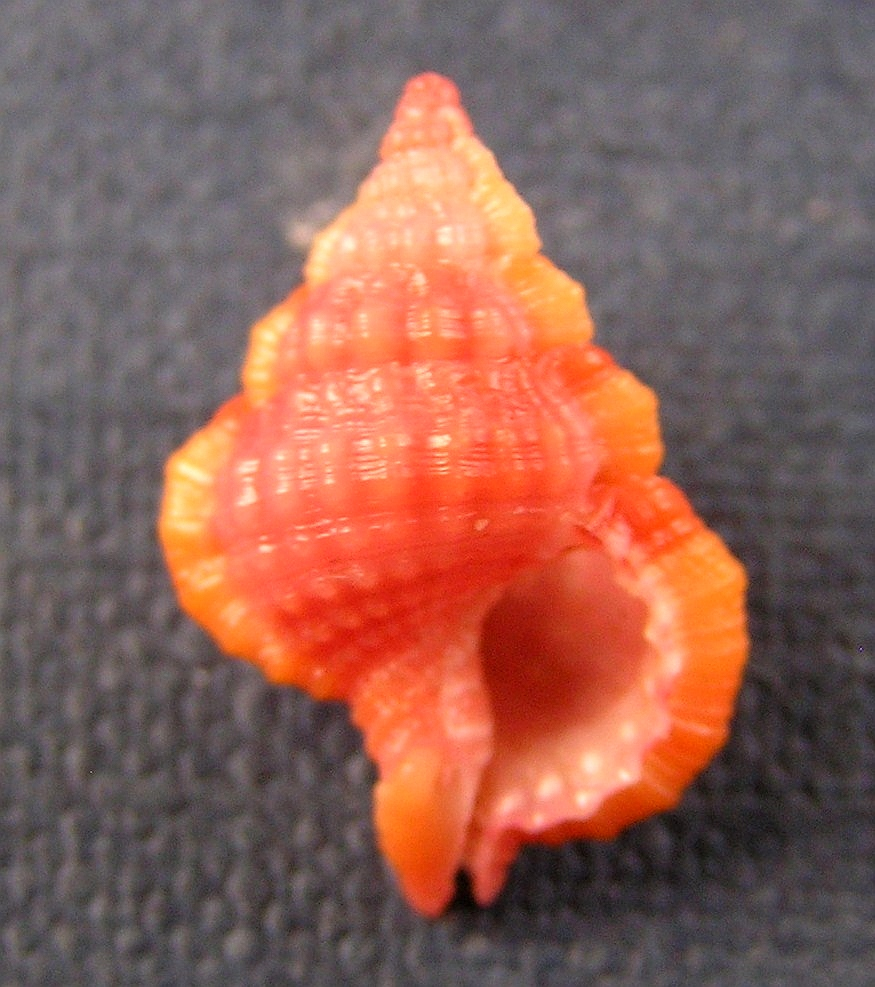
- Gyrineum
  †Gyrineum
  - †Gyrineum gwinae
- Gyrodes
  - †Gyrodes abyssinus
  - †Gyrodes americanus
  - †Gyrodes major
  - †Gyrodes petrosus
  - †Gyrodes spillmani
  - †Gyrodes supraplicatus
- †Gyropleura

== H ==
- †Hadrosaurus – tentative report
- †Hamites
- †Hamulus
  - †Hamulus onyx
  - †Hamulus ripleyanus
  - †Hamulus squamosus
- †Harduinia
  - †Harduinia aequorea
  - †Harduinia dalli
  - †Harduinia mortoni
  - †Harduinia mortonis
  - †Harduinia weatherbyi
- †Heliacus
  - †Heliacus reticulatus
- †Helicaulax
  - †Helicaulax formosa
- †Helicoceras
- Hemiaster
  - †Hemiaster humphreysanus
  - †Hemiaster wetherbyi
- Hemiscyllium
- †Hercorhynchus
  - †Hercorhynchus quadriliratus
- †Hercorhyncus
  - †Hercorhyncus bicarinatus
  - †Hercorhyncus pagodaformis
  - †Hercorhyncus tippanus
  - †Hercorhyncus triliratus
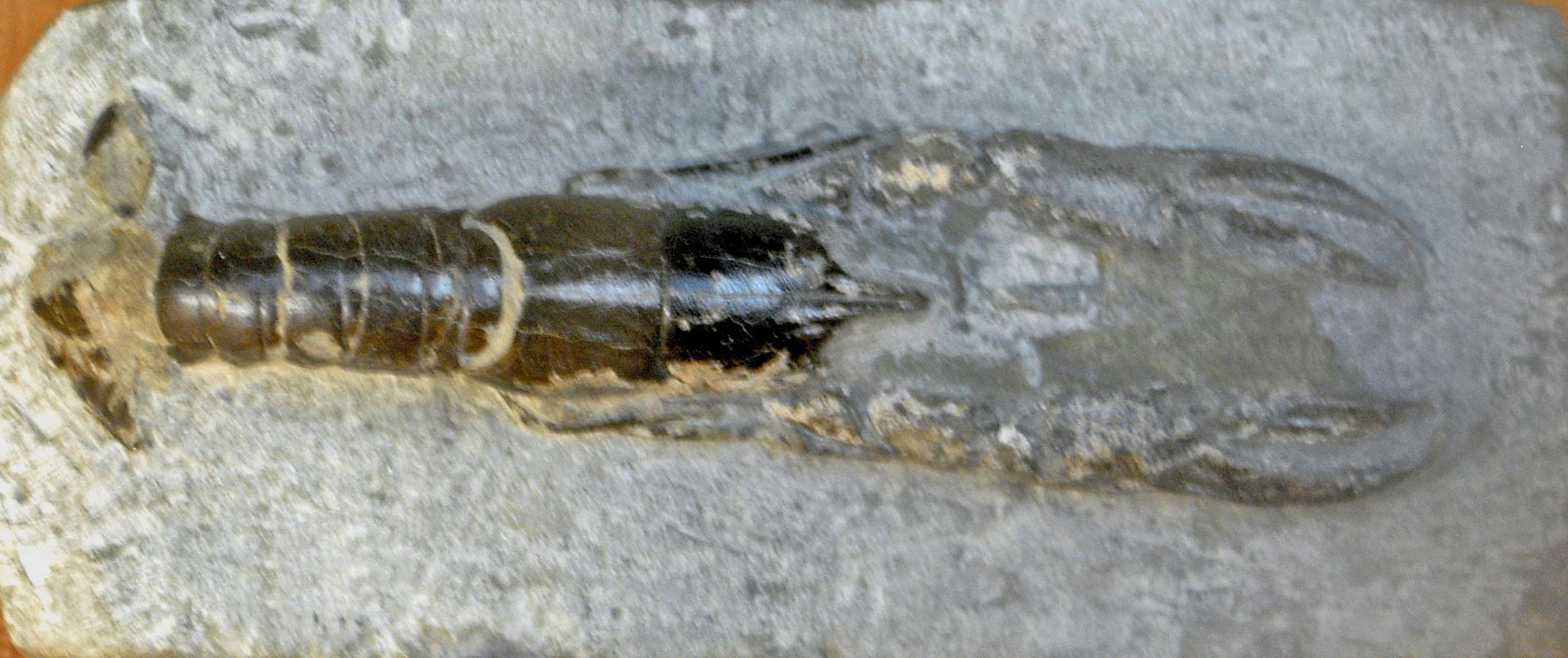
- Fossil of the Jurassic-Paleogene lobster Hoploparia
  †Hoploparia
  - †Hoploparia tennesseensis
- Hyala
  - †Hyala fragila
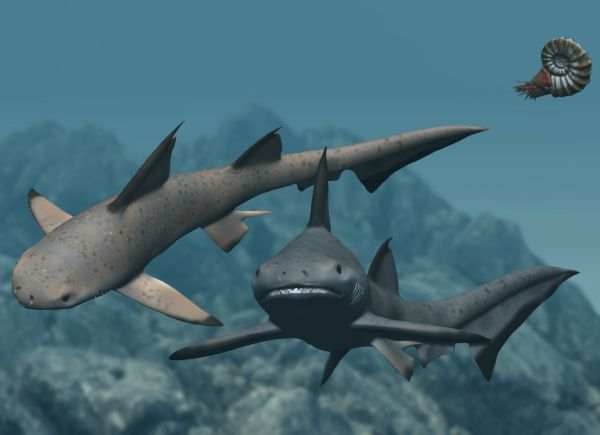
- Restoration of two of the Permian-Late Cretaceous cartilaginous fish Hybodus
  †Hybodus
- †Hydrotribulus
  - †Hydrotribulus elegans
- †Hyphantoceras – tentative report
  - †Hyphantoceras amapondense
- †Hypolophus
  - †Hypolophus mcnultyi

== I ==
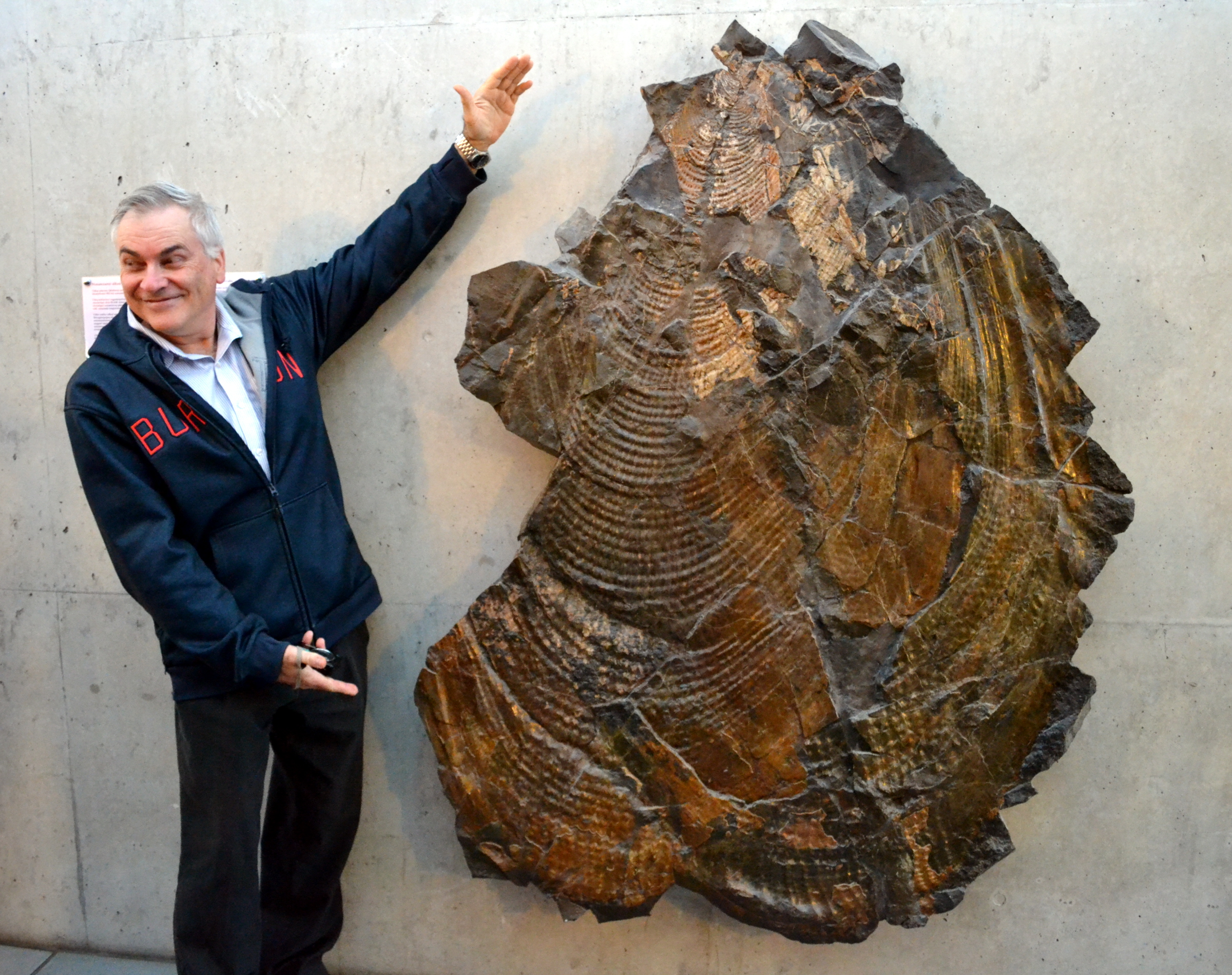
- Fossilized shell of the Early Jurassic-Late Cretaceous marine bivalve Inoceramus with a human indicating its size
  †Inoceramus
  - †Inoceramus quadrans – or unidentified comparable form
- †Inoperna
- †Ischyrhiza
  - †Ischyrhiza mira

== J ==
- Juliacorbula
  - †Juliacorbula monmouthensis

== K ==
- †Kummelia

== L ==
- †Lacrimiforma
  - †Lacrimiforma secunda
- Laternula
  - †Laternula robusta
- †Latiala
  - †Latiala lobata
- †Latiata – tentative report
- †Laxispira
  - †Laxispira lumbricalis
  - †Laxispira monilifera
- †Lefortia
  - †Lefortia trojana – type locality for species
- †Legumen
  - †Legumen ellipticum
- †Lemniscolittorina
  - †Lemniscolittorina berryi
  - †Lemniscolittorina yonkersi
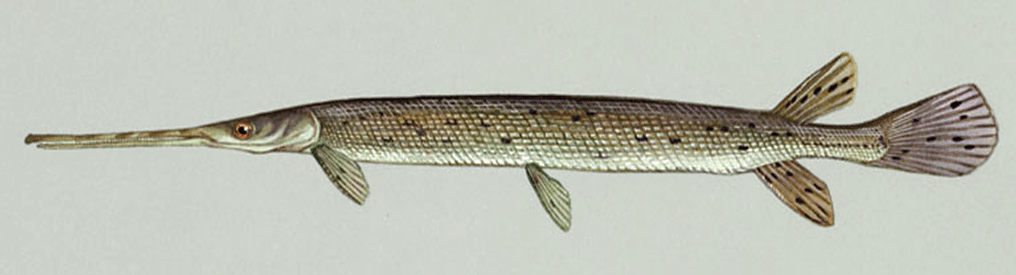
- Illustration of a living Lepisosteus, or gar
  Lepisosteus
- †Leptosolen
  - †Leptosolen biplicata
- Lima
  - †Lima deatsvillensis
  - †Lima pelagica
- Limatula
  - †Limatula acutilineata
- Limopsis
  - †Limopsis meeki
  - †Limopsis perbrevis
- †Linearis
  - †Linearis magnoliensis
  - †Linearis metastriata
  - †Linearis pectinis
- †Linthia
  - †Linthia variabilis
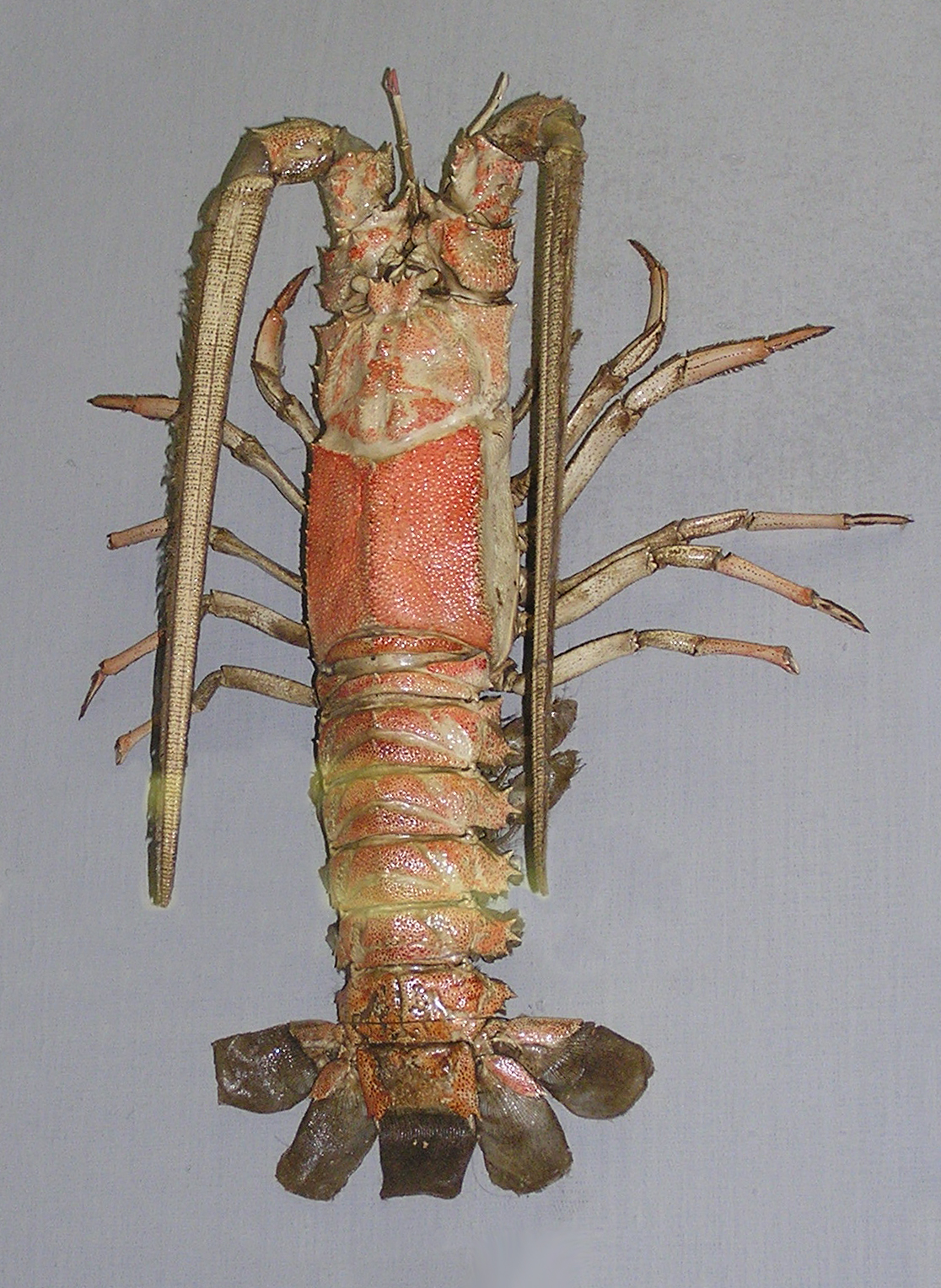
- A modern Linuparus spiny lobster
  Linuparus
  - †Linuparus canadensis
- †Liopeplum
  - †Liopeplum canalis
  - †Liopeplum cretaceum
  - †Liopeplum leioderma
  - †Liopeplum nodosum
  - †Liopeplum rugosum
  - †Liopeplum spiculatum
- †Liopistha
  - †Liopistha protexta
- †Liothyris
  - †Liothyris carolinensis
- †Lispodesthes
  - †Lispodesthes amplus
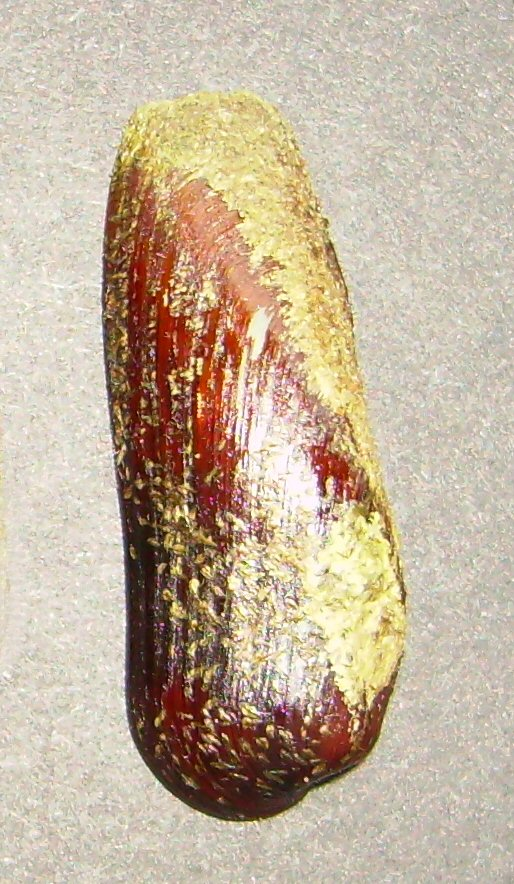
- Shell of a Lithophaga, or date mussel
  Lithophaga
- †Lomirosa
  - †Lomirosa carinata
- †Longitubus
- †Longoconcha
  - †Longoconcha dalli
  - †Longoconcha imbricatus
  - †Longoconcha quadrilirata
  - †Longoconcha tennesseensis
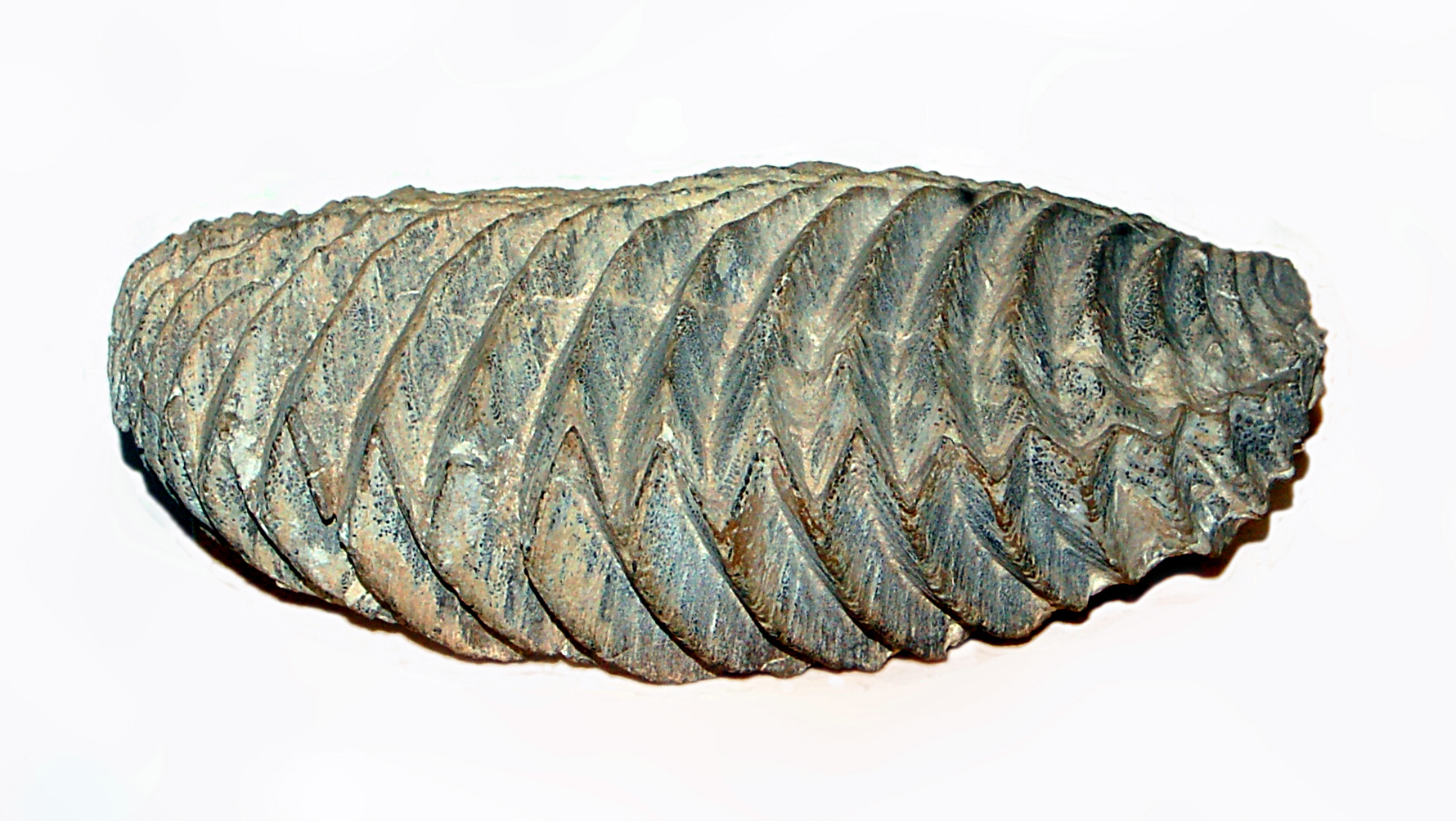
- Fossilized shell of the Triassic-modern marine bivalve Lopha
  Lopha
  - †Lopha falcata
  - †Lopha mesenterica
- †Lowenstamia
  - †Lowenstamia cucullata
  - †Lowenstamia funiculus
  - †Lowenstamia liratus
  - †Lowenstamia subplanus – or unidentified comparable form
- †Lucina – tentative report
- †Lupira
  - †Lupira disparila
  - †Lupira pyriformis
  - †Lupira turbinea
- †Lycettia
  - †Lycettia tippana
  - †Lycettia tippanus
- †Lyriochlamys
  - †Lyriochlamys cretosa
  - †Lyriochlamys cretosus

== M ==
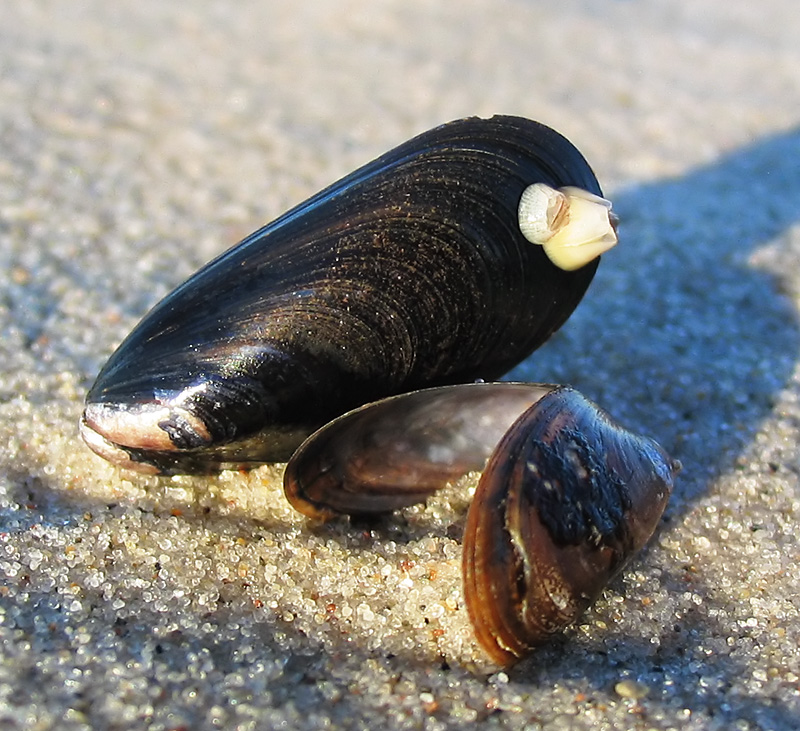
Shells washed ashore of Mytilus mussels

- Malletia
  - †Malletia longfrons
  - †Malletia longifrons
  - †Malletia stephensoni
- †Margaritella
  - †Margaritella pumila
- †Mataxa
  - †Mataxa elegans
  - †Mataxa leioderma
- †Mathilda
  - †Mathilda cedarensis
  - †Mathilda corona
  - †Mathilda hexalira
  - †Mathilda pentalira
  - †Mathilda ripleyana
  - †Mathilda unionensis
- †Menabites
  - †Menabites danei
  - †Menabites delawarensis
- Meretrix – tentative report
- †Mesodendriurn
  - †Mesodendriurn oktibbehaensis
- †Micrabacia
  - †Micrabacia marylandica – type locality for species
  - †Micrabacia radiata – type locality for species
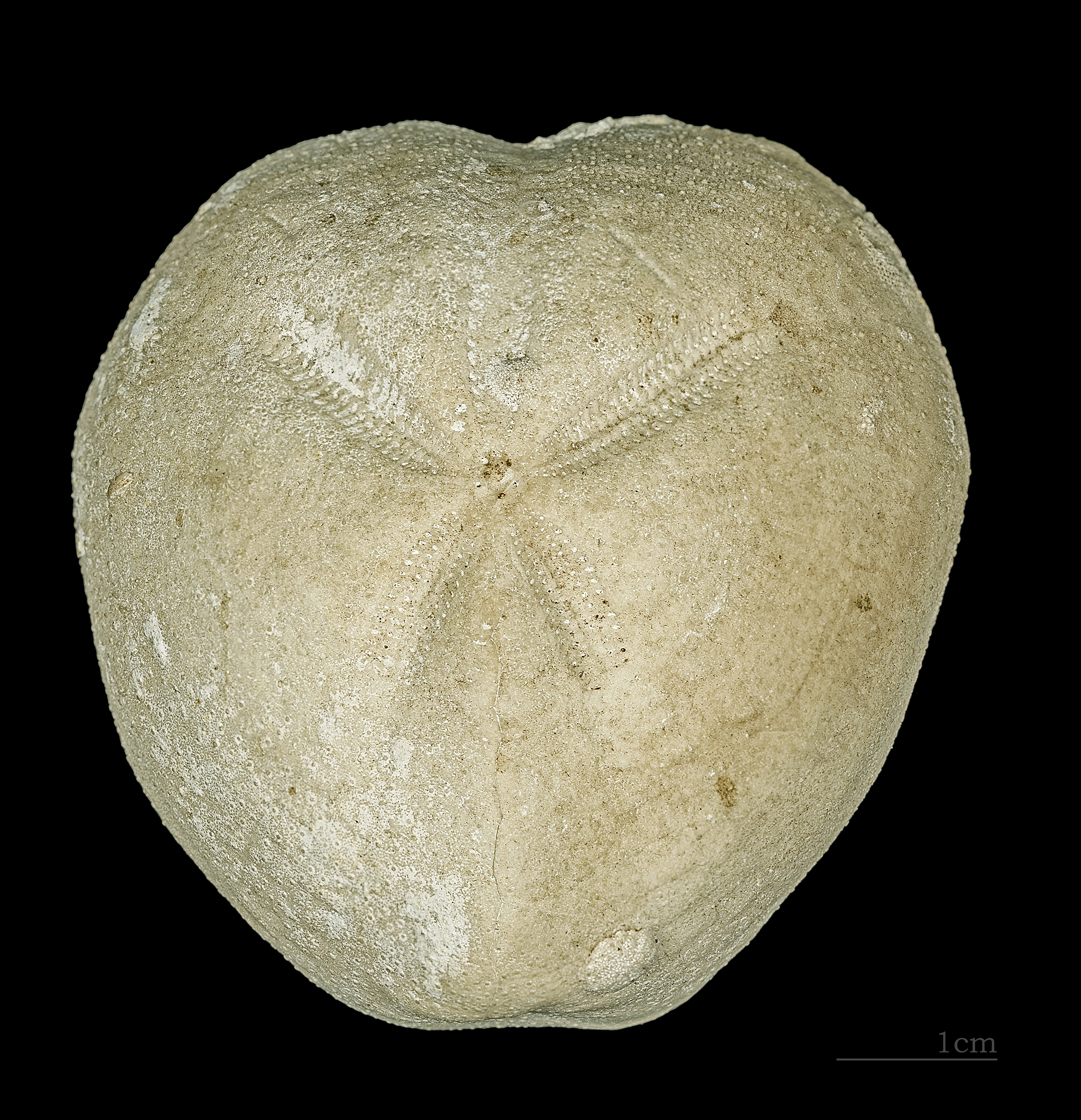
- Fossil of the Late Cretaceous-Eocene sea urchin Micraster
  †Micraster
  - †Micraster americanus
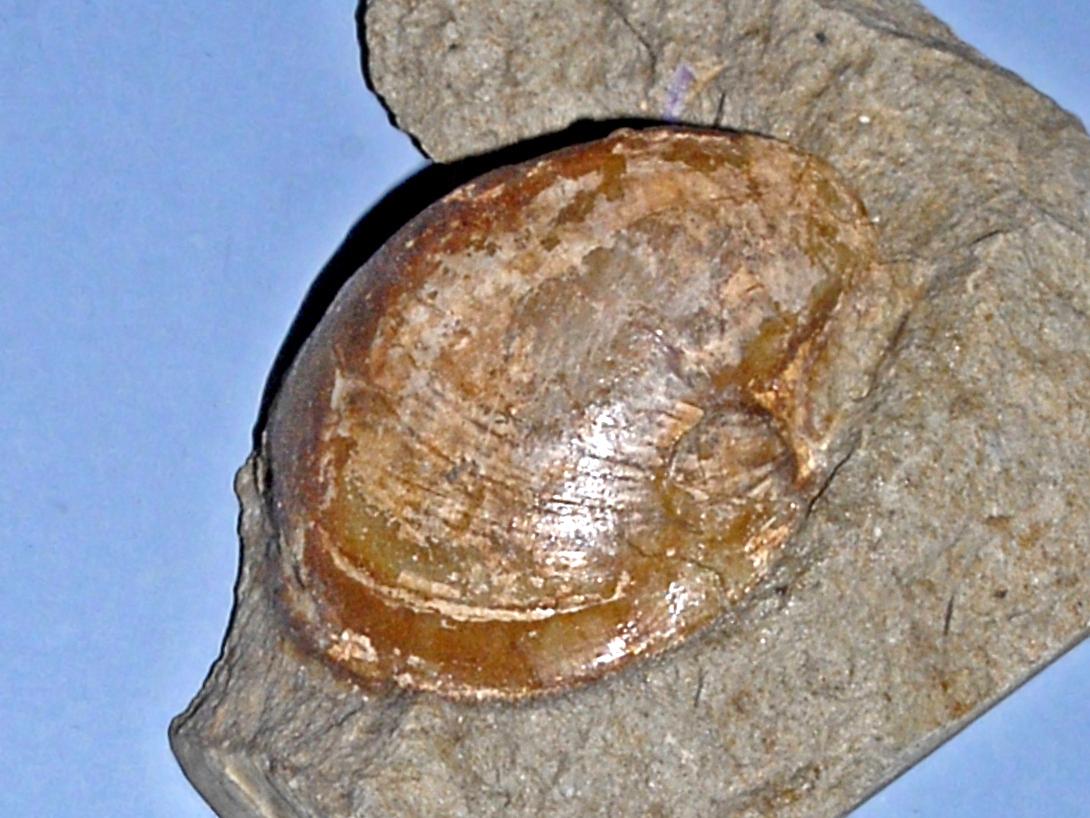
- Fossilized shell of the Devonian-modern marine bivalve Modiolus, or horsemussel
  Modiolus
  - †Modiolus sedesclaris
  - †Modiolus sedesclarus
- †Monroea
  - †Monroea coffea
- †Morea
  - †Morea corsicanensis
  - †Morea corsicanensis depressa
  - †Morea marylandica
  - †Morea rotunda
  - †Morea transenna
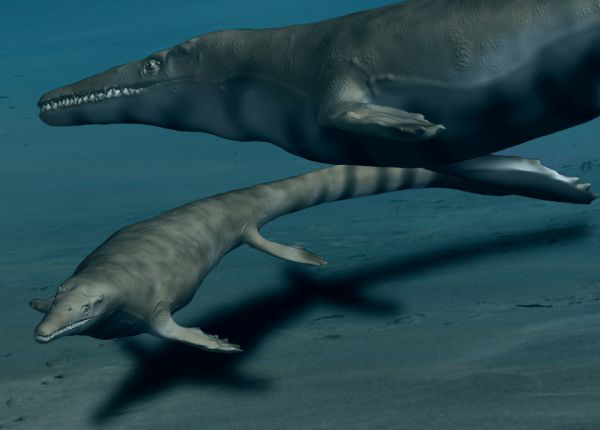
- Life restoration of two of the Late Cretaceous Mosasaurus
  †Mosasaurus
- †Myobarbum
  - †Myobarbum laevigatum
- Myrtea
  - †Myrtea stephensoni
- †Mytilus – tentative report

== N ==
- †Napulus
  - †Napulus fragilis
  - †Napulus octoliratus
- †Neamphitomaria
  - †Neamphitomaria planospira
  - †Neamphitomaria reticulata
  - †Neamphitomaria stantoni
- †Neithea
  - †Neithea bexarensis
- †Nemoarca
- †Nemocardium
  - †Nemocardium fragile
- †Nemodon
  - †Nemodon brevifrons
  - †Nemodon eufalensis
  - †Nemodon eufaulensis
  - †Nemodon grandis – or unidentified comparable form
  - †Nemodon neusensis
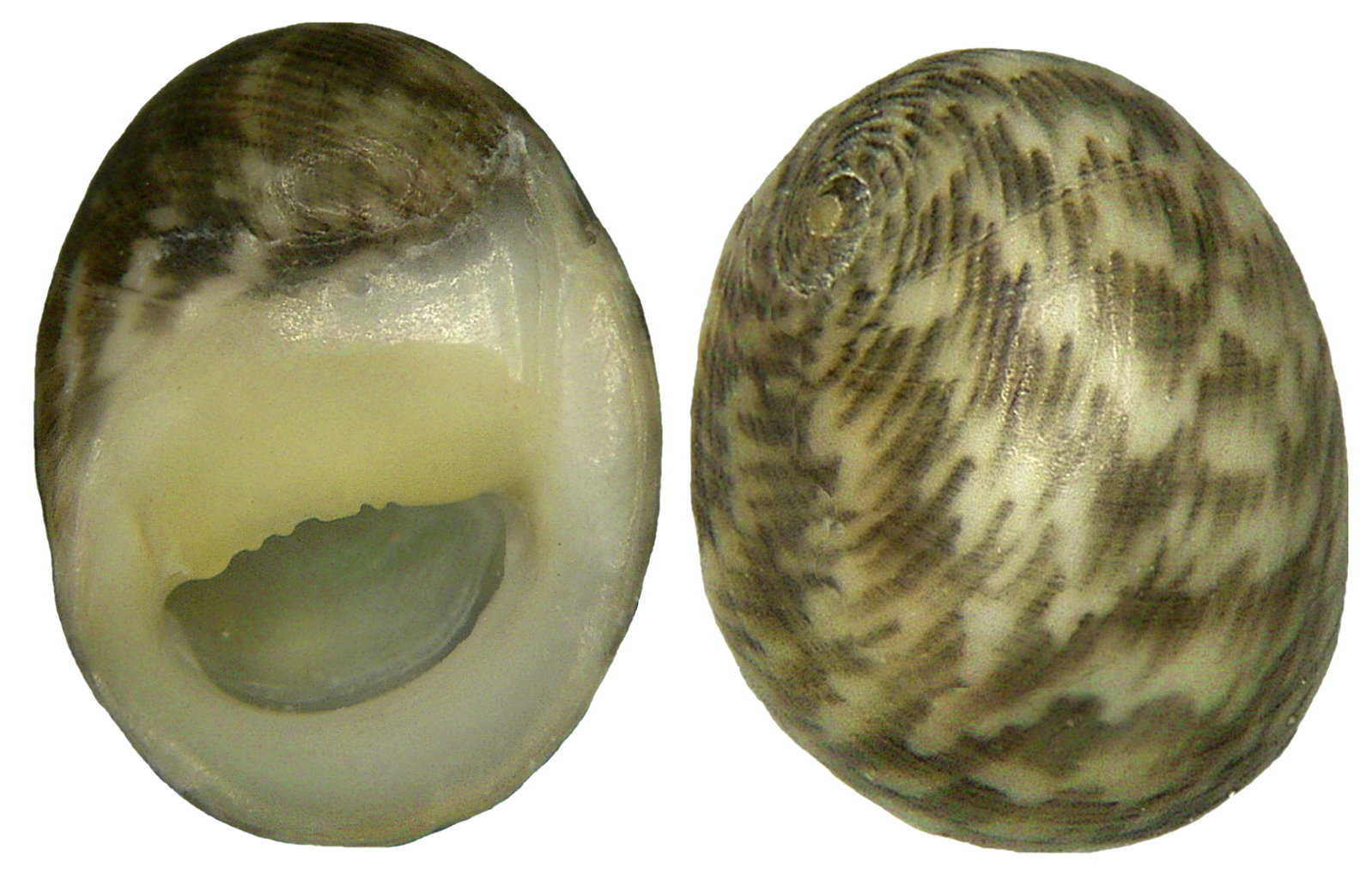
- Shell in multiple views of a Nerita polita sea snail
  Nerita
  - †Nerita reticulirata
- Neritina
  - †Neritina densata – tentative report
- †Nonactaeonina
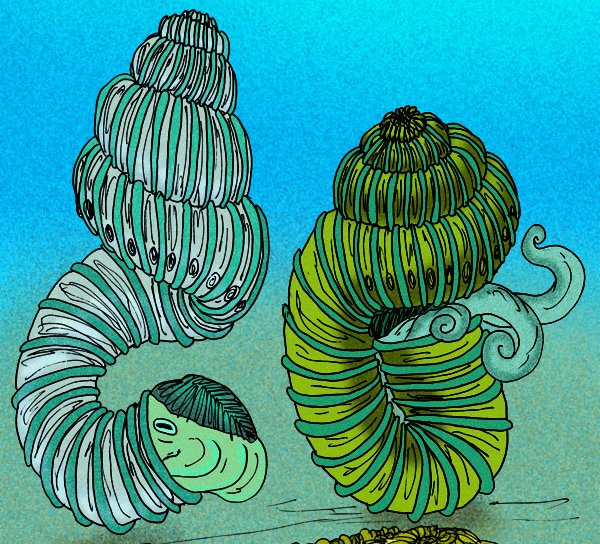
- Restoration of several species of the Late Cretaceous ammonoid cephalopod Nostoceras
  †Nostoceras
  - †Nostoceras turrilites – tentative report
- †Notopocorystes
  - †Notopocorystes testacea
- Nozeba
  - †Nozeba crassa
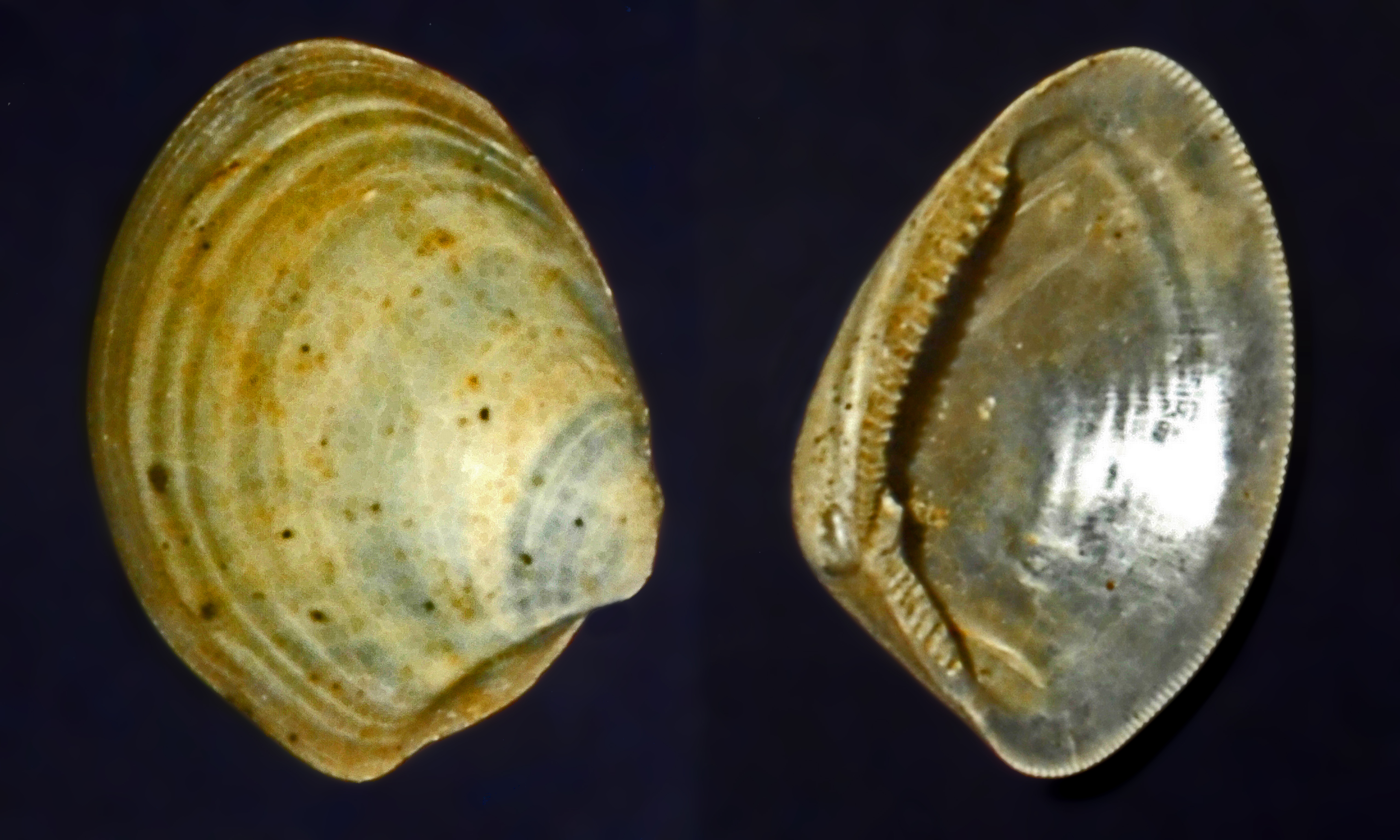
- Interior of a fossilized shell of the Early Ordovician-modern marine bivalve Nucula
  Nucula
  - †Nucula camia
  - †Nucula cuneifrons
  - †Nucula percrassa
  - †Nucula perequalis
  - †Nucula stantoni
- Nuculana
  - †Nuculana tarensis
  - †Nuculana whitfieldi
- †Nudivagus
- †Nymphalucina
  - †Nymphalucina linearia
  - †Nymphalucina parva

== O ==
- †Odontobasis – tentative report
  - †Odontobasis sulcata
- †Oligoptycha
  - †Oligoptycha corrugata
- Opaliopsis
  - †Opaliopsis angustocota
- †Opertochasma
- †Ornopsis
  - †Ornopsis digressa
  - †Ornopsis elevata
  - †Ornopsis modica
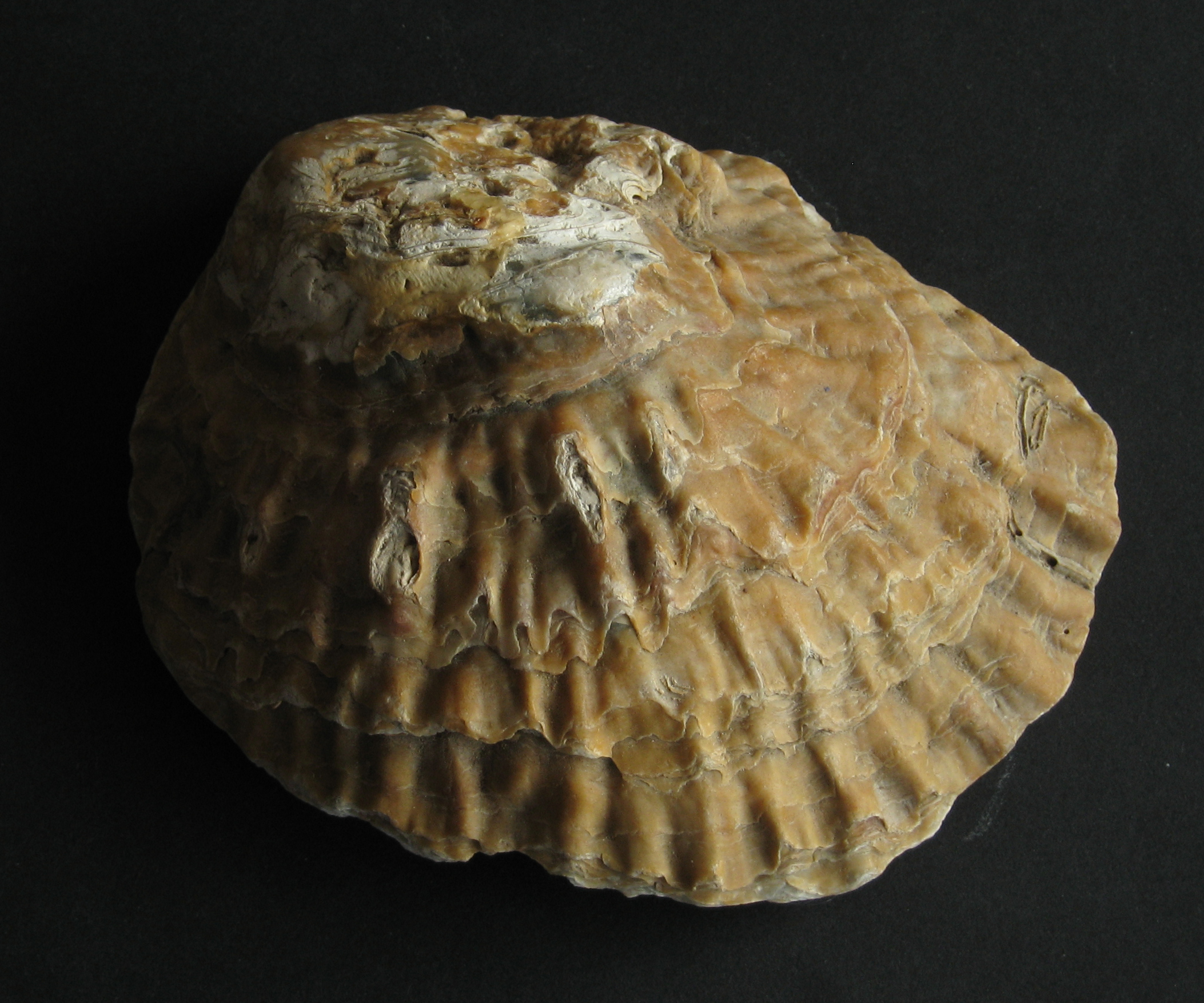
- Shell of an Ostrea, or oyster
  Ostrea
  - †Ostrea sloani

== P ==
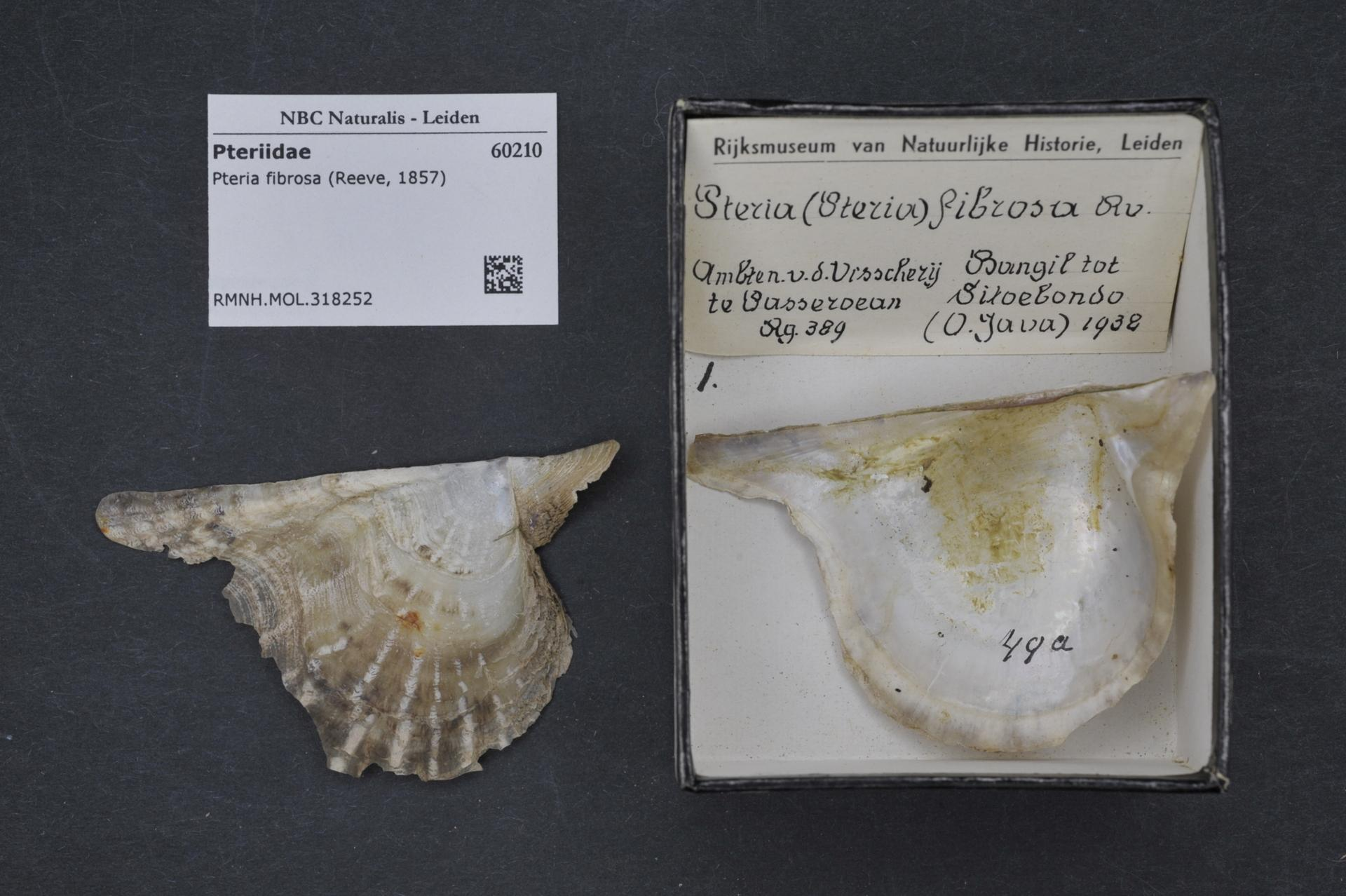
Interior and exterior of the shell of a Pteria, or winged oyster

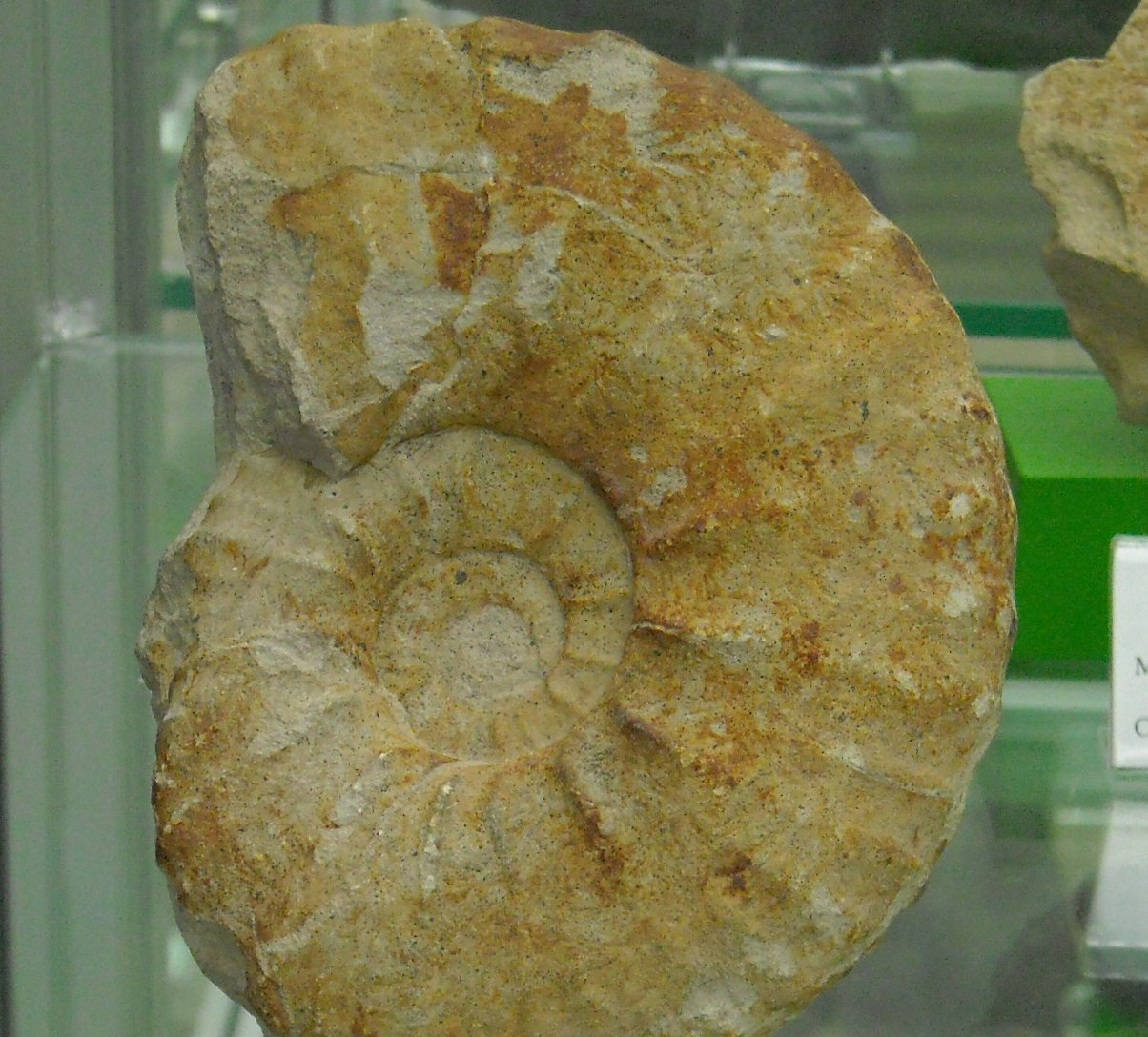
- Fossilized shell of the Late Cretaceous ammonoid cephalopod Pachydiscus
  †Pachydiscus
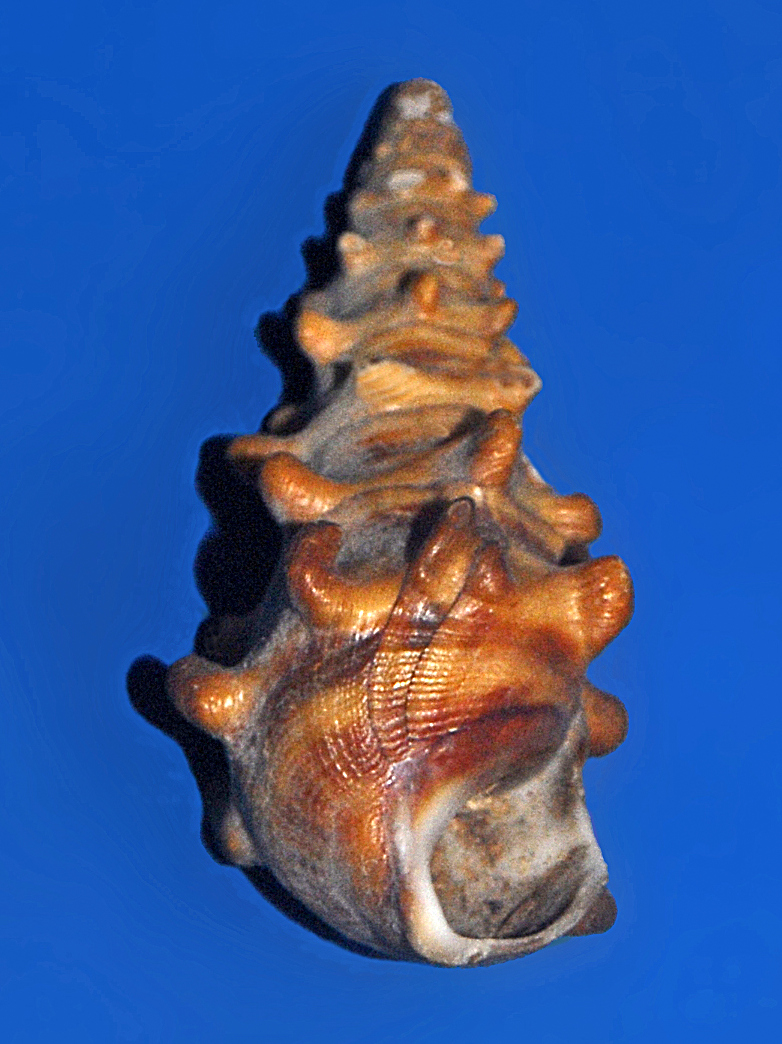
- Shell of a Pachymelania freshwater snail
  †Pachymelania – tentative report
- †Paladmete
  - †Paladmete cancellaria
  - †Paladmete gardnerae
  - †Paladmete gardnerae pygmaea
  - †Paladmete laevis
- †Palaeoxantho – type locality for genus
  - †Palaeoxantho libertiensis – type locality for species
- †Paleofusimitra
  - †Paleofusimitra elongata
- †Paleopsephaea
  - †Paleopsephaea mutabilis
  - †Paleopsephaea tenuilirata
- Panopea
  - †Panopea monmouthensis
- †Parafusus
  - †Parafusus callilateris
  - †Parafusus coloratus
  - †Parafusus saffordi
- †Paranomia
  - †Paranomia scabra
- †Parapaguristes
  - †Parapaguristes tuberculatus – type locality for species
  - †Parapaguristes whitteni – type locality for species
- †Parmicorbula
  - †Parmicorbula suffalciata
  - †Parmicorbula terramaria
  - †Parmicorbula torta
- †Pauciacirsa
  - †Pauciacirsa simplex
- Pecten
  - †Pecten venustus
- †Periplomya
  - †Periplomya applicata
- †Perissoptera
  - †Perissoptera prolabiata mississippiensis
- †Perrisonota
  - †Perrisonota protexta
- Phacoides
  - †Phacoides mattiformis – tentative report
- †Phelopteria
  - †Phelopteria linguaeformis
  - †Phelopteria linguiformis
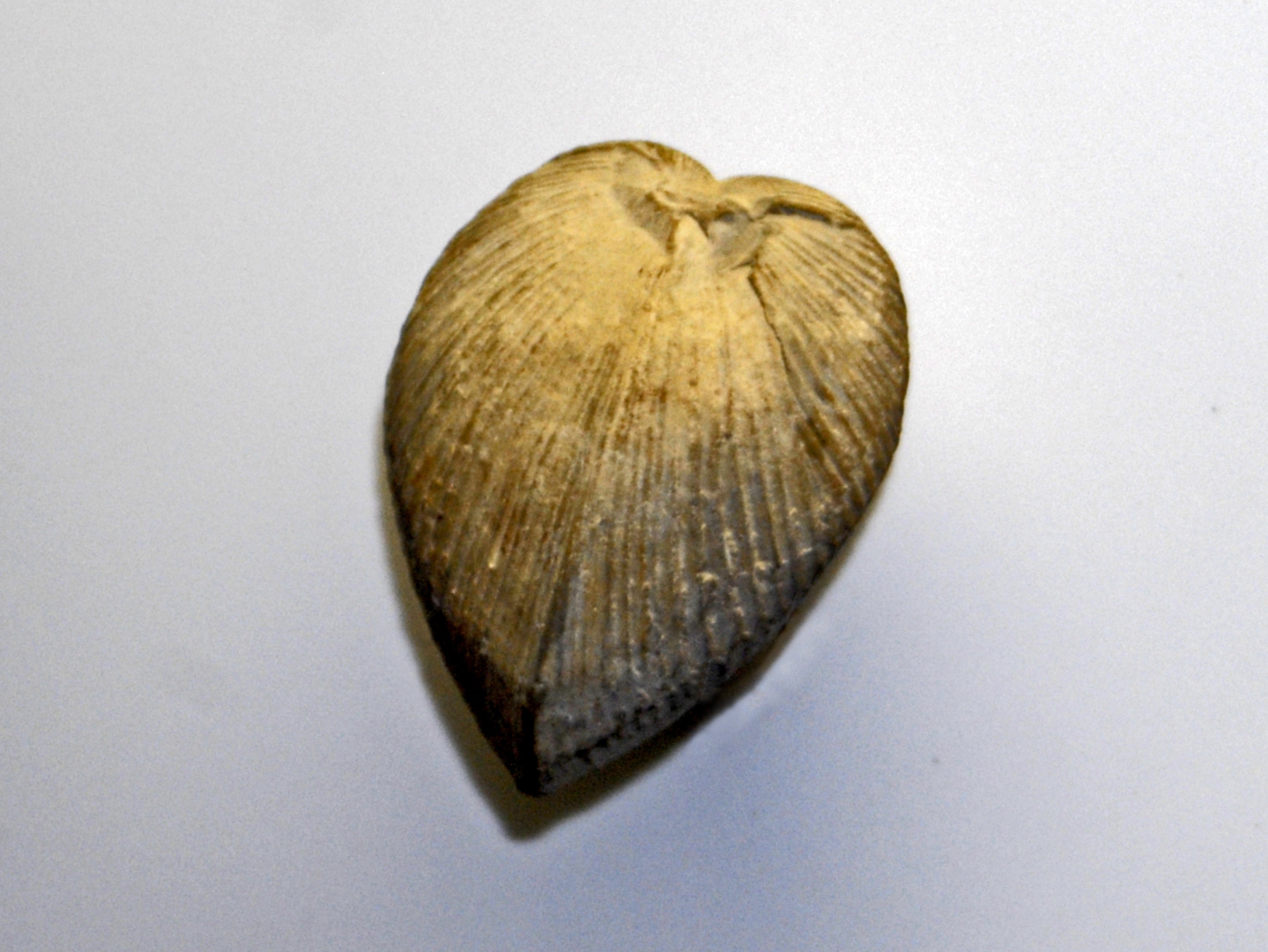
- Fossilized shell of the Early Triassic-Pliocene marine bivalve Pholadomya
  Pholadomya
  - †Pholadomya occidentalis
- †Piestochilus
  - †Piestochilus curviliratus
- Pinna
  - †Pinna laqueata
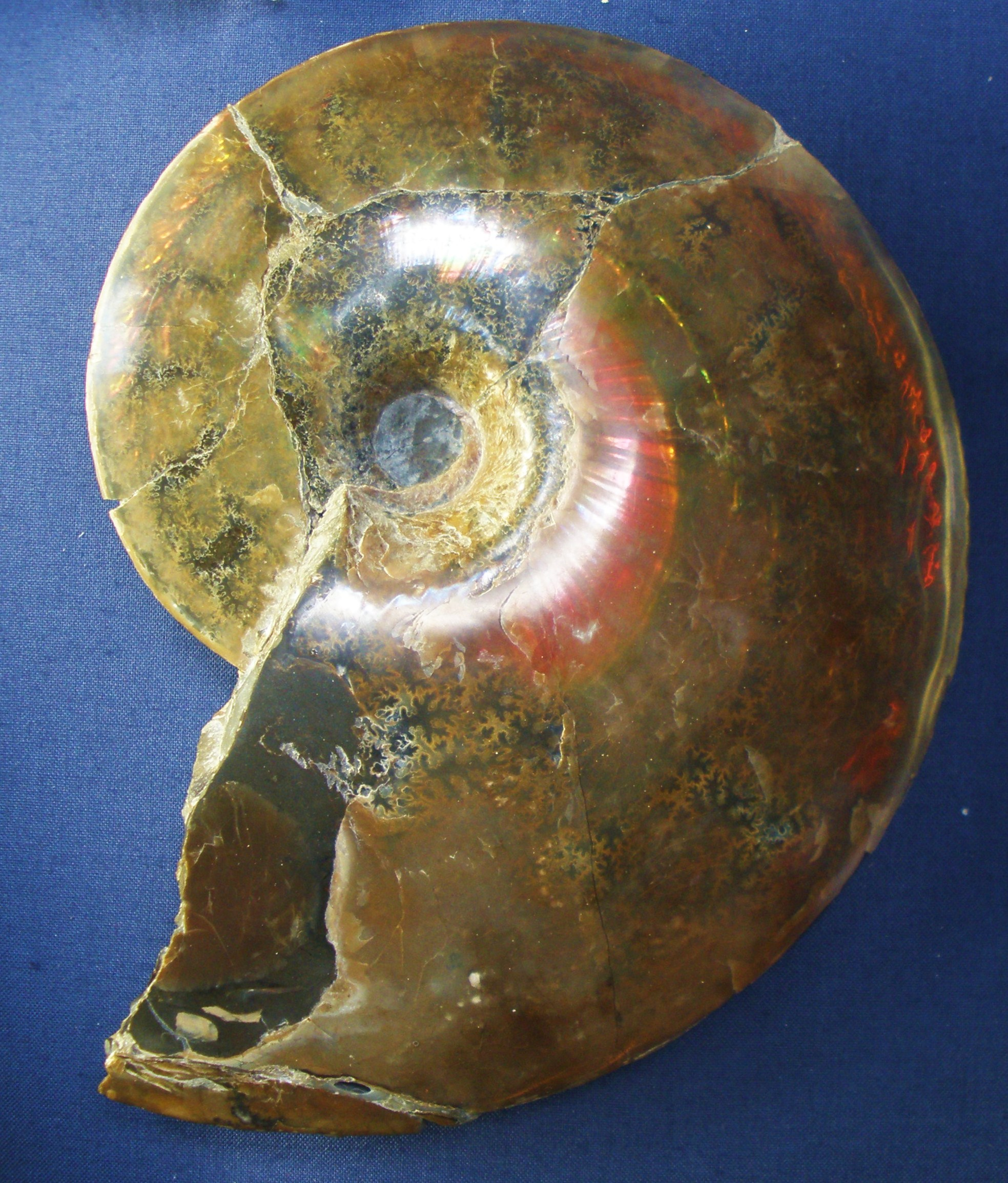
- Fossilized shell of the Late Cretaceous ammonoid cephalopod Placenticeras
  †Placenticeras
  - †Placenticeras placenta
  - †Placenticeras syrtale
- †Plagiostoma
  - †Plagiostoma woodsi
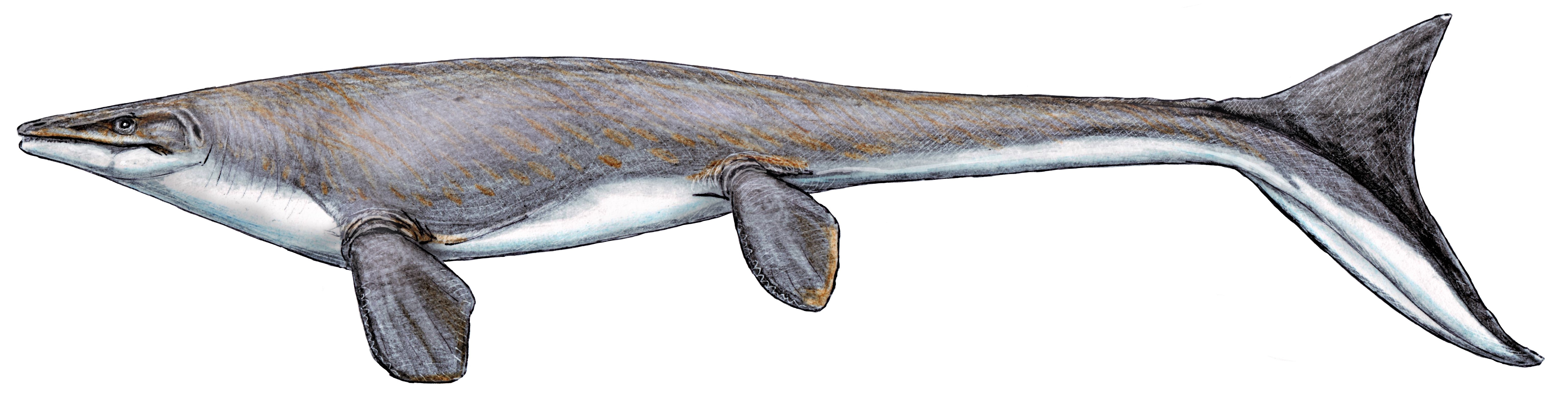
- Restoration of the Late Cretaceous mosasaur Platecarpus
  †Platecarpus – type locality for genus
  - †Platecarpus tympaniticus – type locality for species
- †Plectomya
- †Plesiotriton
  - †Plesiotriton cretaceus
- †Pleuriocardia
  - †Pleuriocardia eufaulense
- Plicatula
  - †Plicatula mullicaensis
  - †Plicatula tetrica
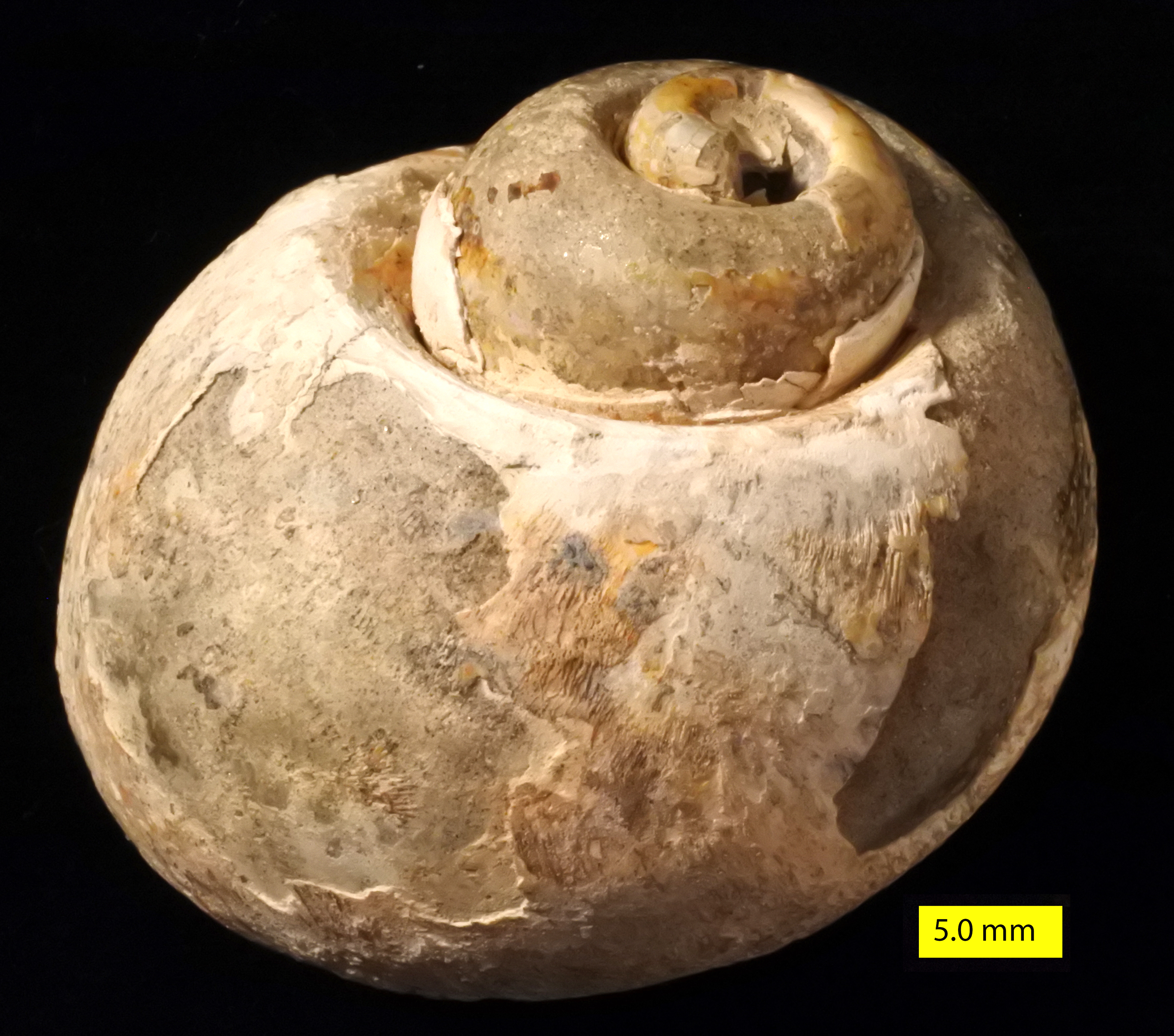
- Fossilized shell of the Paleocene-modern moon snail Polinices
  Polinices
  - †Polinices kummeli
- †Postligata
  - †Postligata wordeni
- †Praeleda
  - †Praeleda compar
- †Prehepatus
  - †Prehepatus harrisi
- †Promathildia
  - †Promathildia parvula
- †Protobusycon
  - †Protobusycon binodosum
- †Protocallianassa
  - †Protocallianassa mortoni
- †Protocardia
  - †Protocardia spillmani
  - †Protocardia stantoni
- †Pseudoclaviscala
  - †Pseudoclaviscala laevicosta
  - †Pseudoclaviscala rugacosta
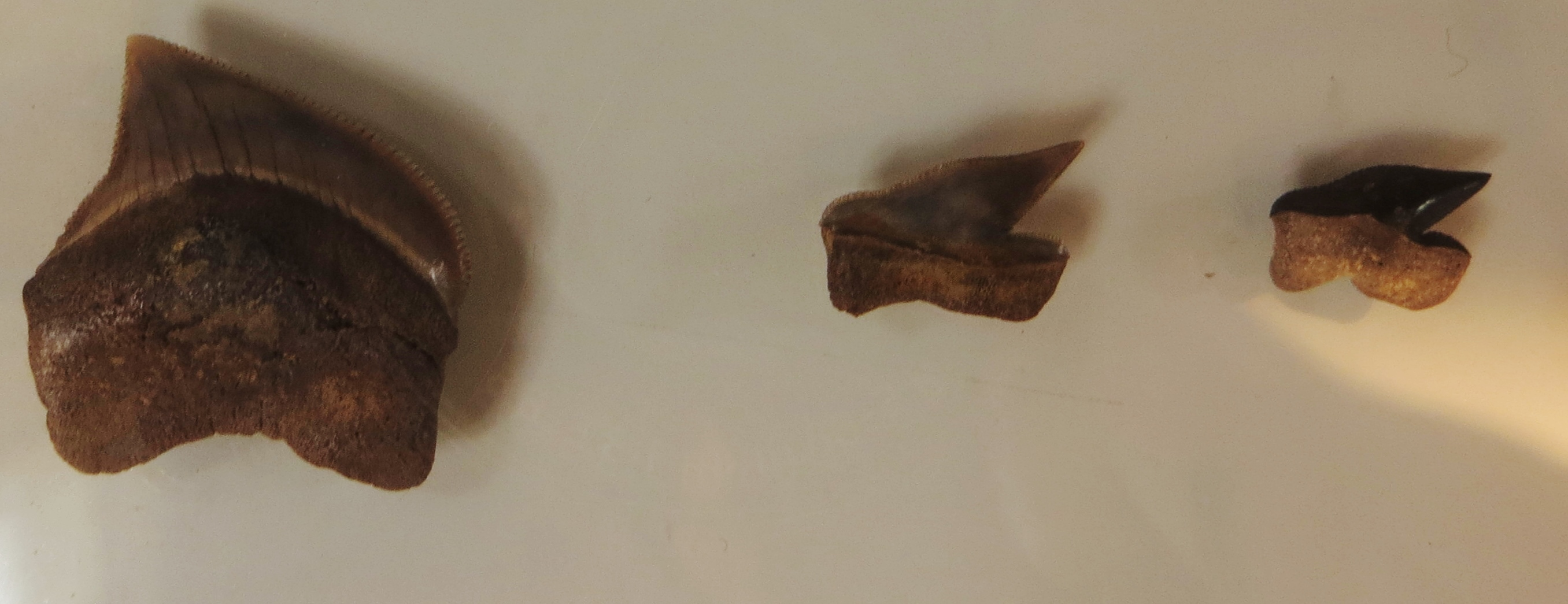
- Fossilized teeth of the Cretaceous shark Pseudocorax
  †Pseudocorax
  - †Pseudocorax granti
- †Pseudolimea
  - †Pseudolimea reticulata
  - †Pseudolimea sellardsi
- Pseudomalaxis
  - †Pseudomalaxis pateriformis
  - †Pseudomalaxis pilsbryi
  - †Pseudomalaxis stantoni
- †Pseudoptera
- †Pseudoschloenbachia
  - †Pseudoschloenbachia mexicana
- †Pteria
  - †Pteria rhombica
- †Pterocerella
  - †Pterocerella maryea
  - †Pterocerella poinsettiformis
  - †Pterocerella pontotocensis
  - †Pterocerella tippana
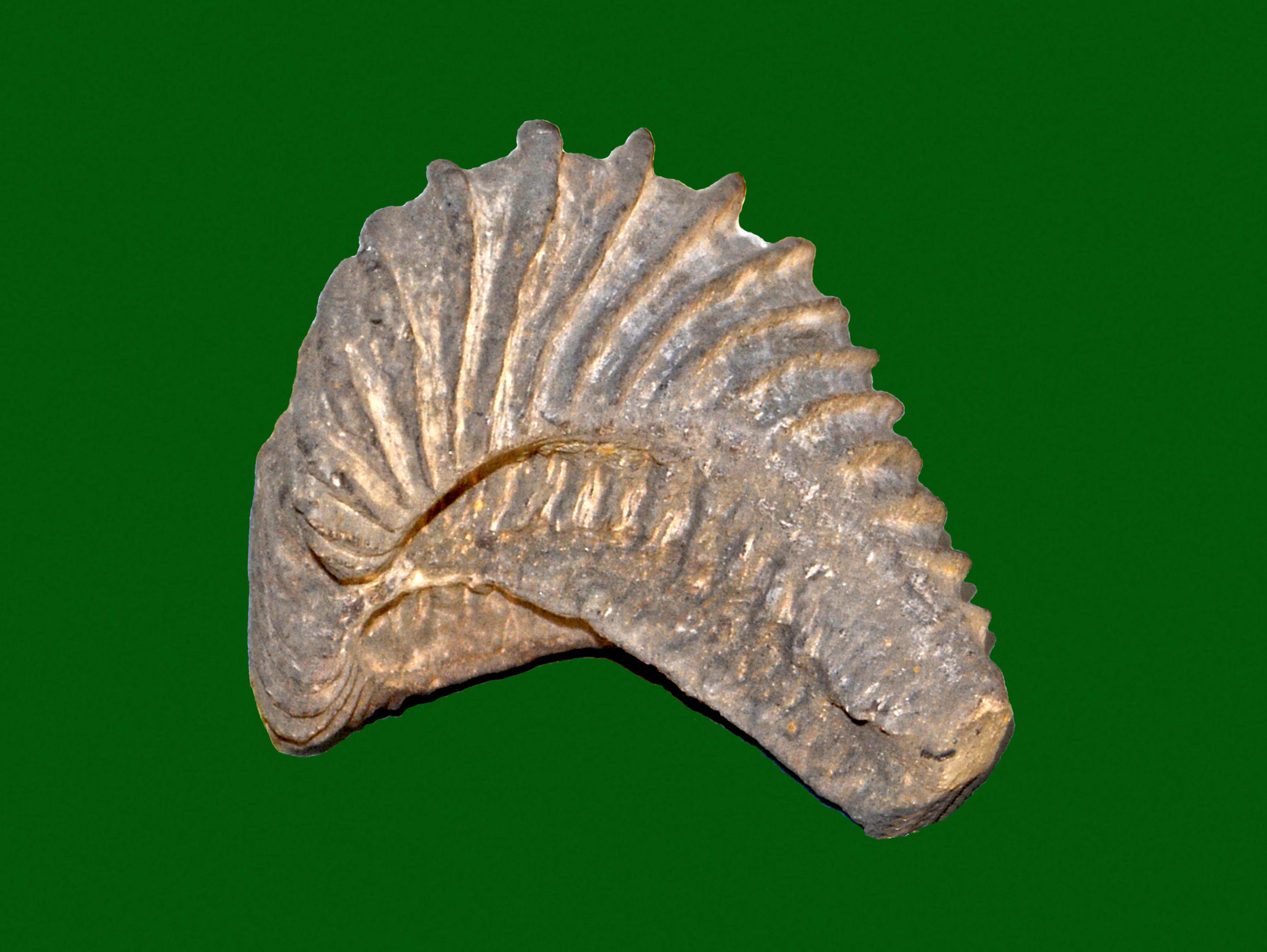
- Fossilized shell of the Jurassic-Cretaceous marine bivalve Pterotrigonia
  †Pterotrigonia
  - †Pterotrigonia angulicostata
  - †Pterotrigonia bartrami
  - †Pterotrigonia eufalensis
  - †Pterotrigonia eufaulensis
  - †Pterotrigonia thoracia
  - †Pterotrigonia thoracica
- †Ptychodus
  - †Ptychodus mortoni
- †Ptychosyca
  - †Ptychosyca inornata
- †Ptychotrygon
  - †Ptychotrygon vermiculata
- †Pugnellus
  - †Pugnellus densatus
  - †Pugnellus goldmani
- Pulvinites
  - †Pulvinites argenteus
- Punctiscala
  - †Punctiscala melaniea
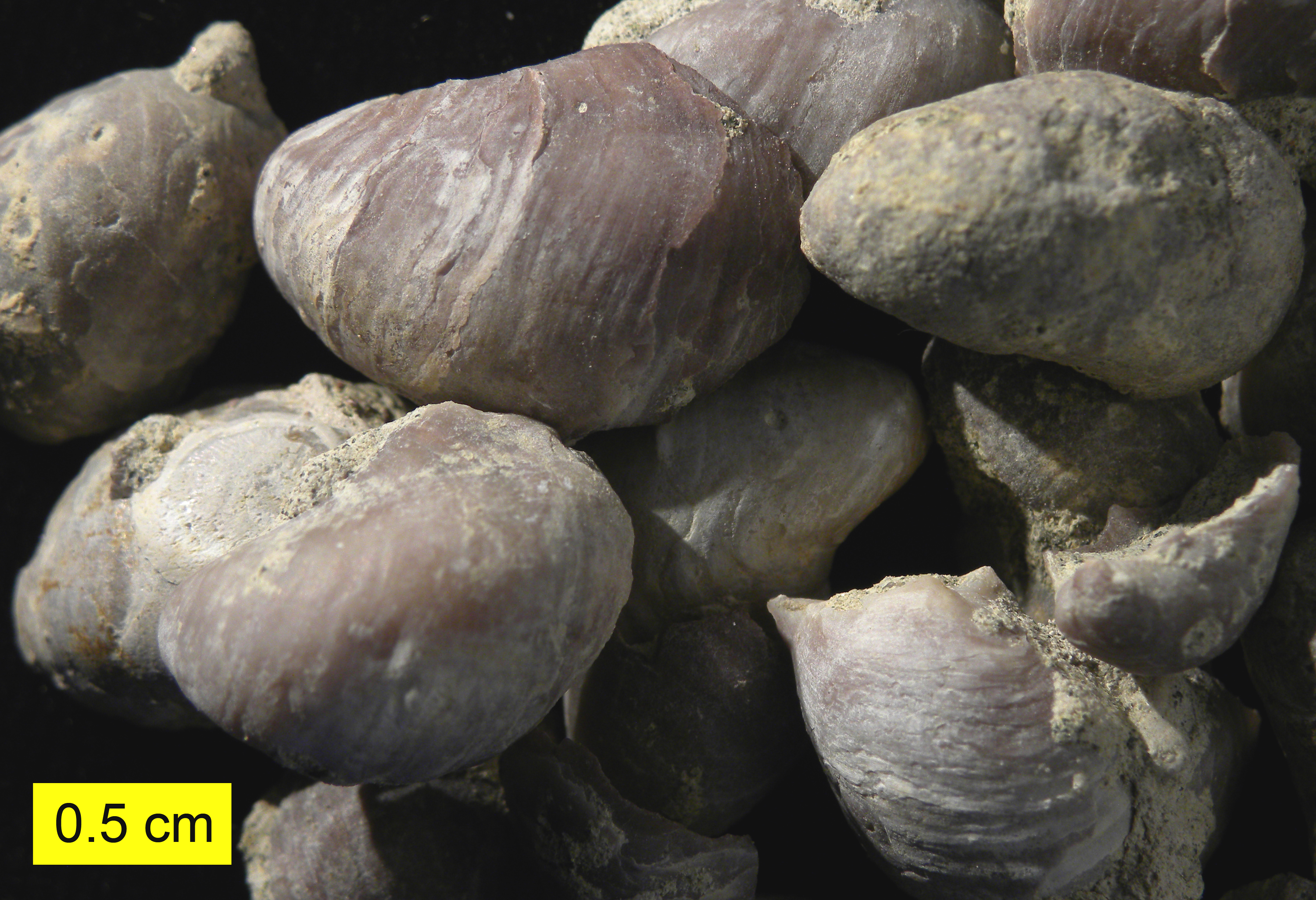
- Assemblage of fossilized shells of the Cretaceous-Pleistocene oyster Pycnodonte
  Pycnodonte
  - †Pycnodonte belli
  - †Pycnodonte mutabilis
  - †Pycnodonte vesiculare
  - †Pycnodonte vesicularis
- †Pyrifusus
  - †Pyrifusus sinuocostatus
  - †Pyrifusus subdensatus
- †Pyropsis
  - †Pyropsis cornutus
  - †Pyropsis interstriatus
  - †Pyropsis perlata
  - †Pyropsis prolixa

== R ==
- †Rachiosoma
  - †Rachiosoma mortoni
- †Radiopecten
  - †Radiopecten mississippiensis
- †Raninella
  - †Raninella tridens
- †Reginaites
  - †Reginaites exilis – type locality for species
  - †Reginaites leei
- †Remera
  - †Remera flexicostata
  - †Remera microstriata
  - †Remera stephensoni
- †Remnita
  - †Remnita anomalocostata
- †Rhombopsis
  - †Rhombopsis molinoensis
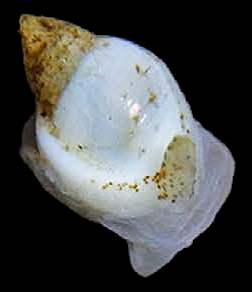
- A living Ringicula sea snail
  Ringicula
  - †Ringicula clarki
  - †Ringicula pulchella
  - †Ringicula yochelsoni

== S ==
- †Sargana
  - †Sargana stantoni
- †Sassia
  - †Sassia carlea
- †Scambula
  - †Scambula perplana
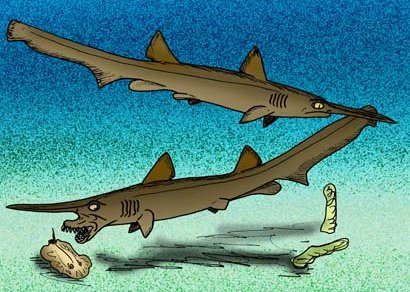
- Restoration of several of the Early Cretaceous-Miocene shark Scapanorhynchus
  †Scapanorhynchus
  - †Scapanorhynchus texanus
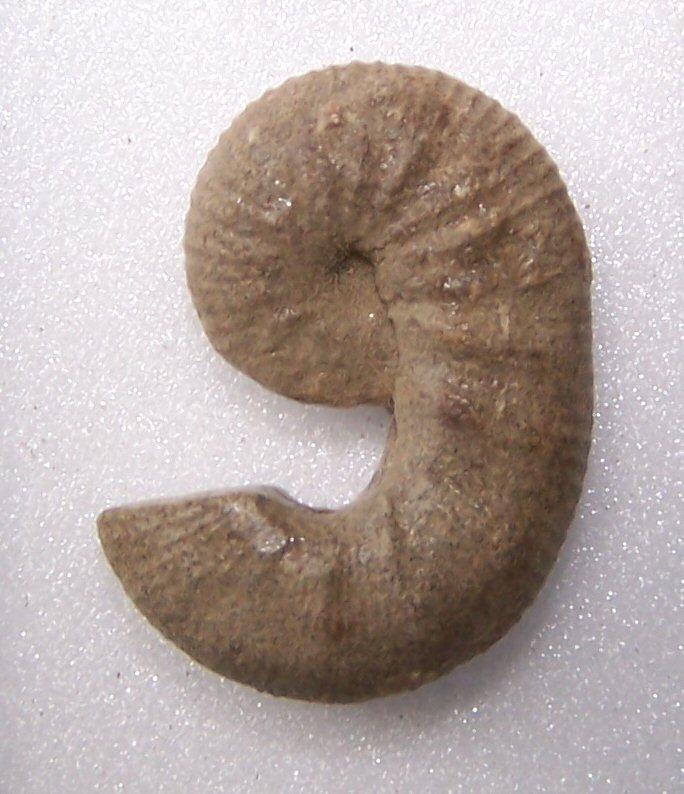
- Fossilized shell of the Late Cretaceous ammonoid cephalopod Scaphites
  †Scaphites
  - †Scaphites leei
- †Sclerorhynchus
- †Scobinidola
  - †Scobinidola guttatus
- Seila
  - †Seila quadrilirata
- Serpula
- †Solariorbis
  - †Solariorbis clara
- †Solenoceras
- †Solyma
  - †Solyma levis
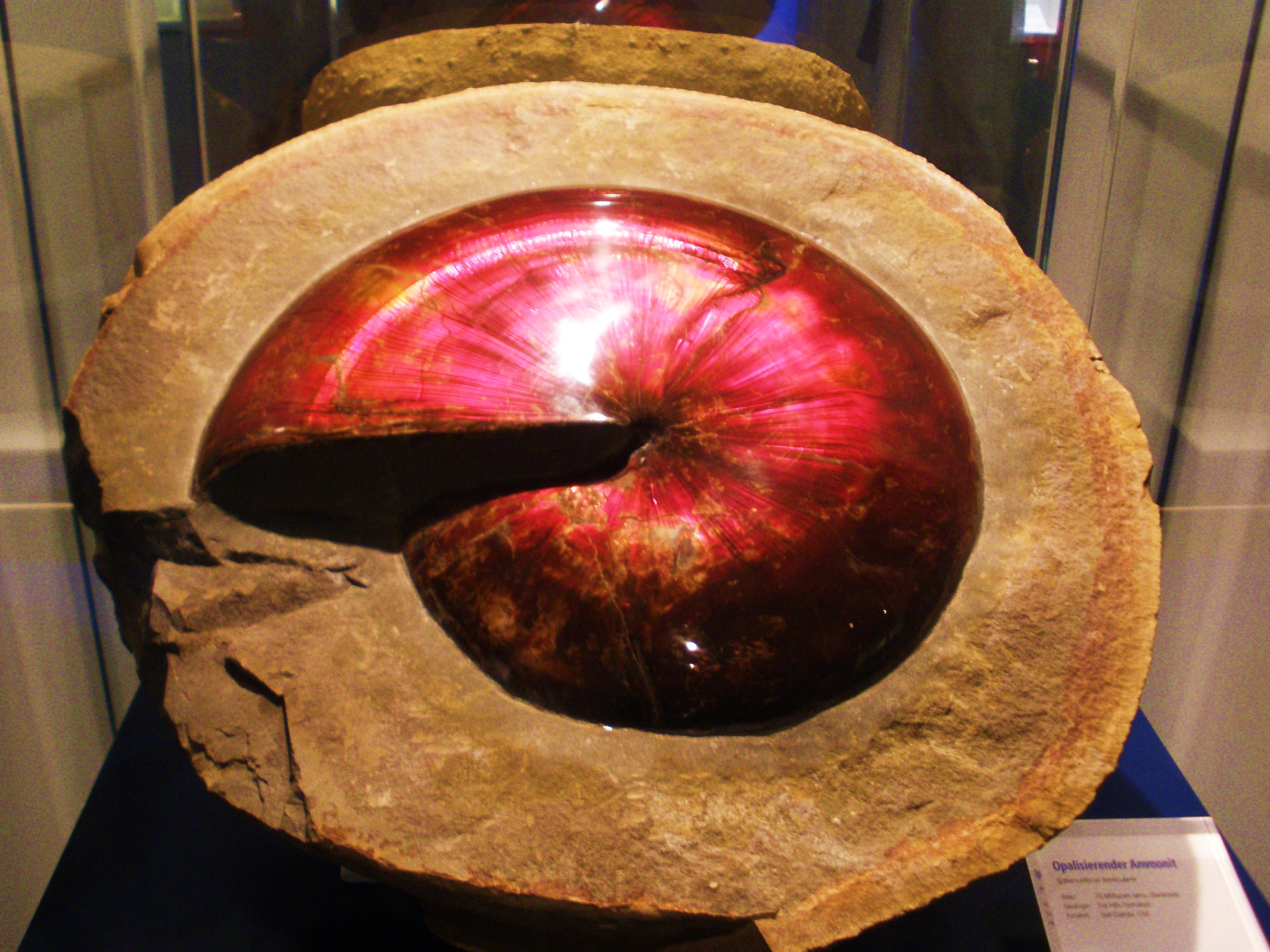
- Opalized shell of the Late Cretaceous ammonoid cephalopod Sphenodiscus
  †Sphenodiscus
  - †Sphenodiscus beecheri
  - †Sphenodiscus lobatus
  - †Sphenodiscus pleurisepta
- †Spinaptychus
- Spondylus
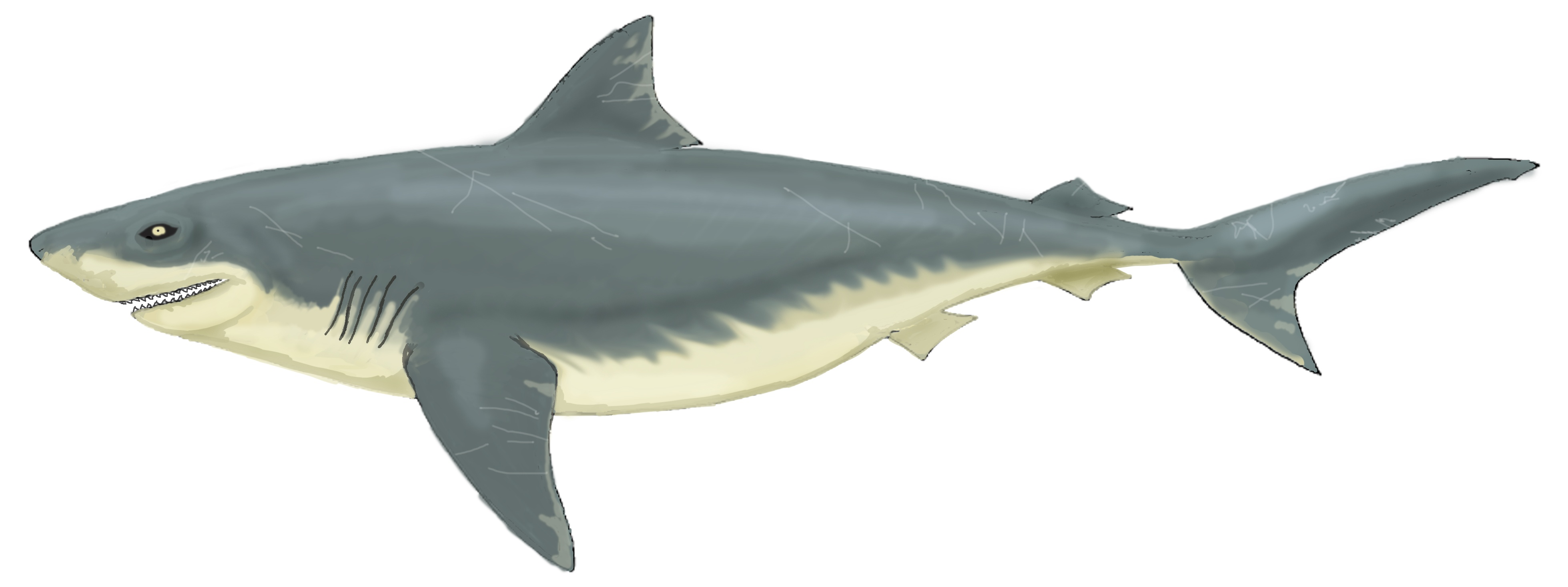
- Life restoration of the Late Cretaceous shark Squalicorax
  Squalicorax
  - †Squalicorax kaupi
- †Stantonella
  - †Stantonella interrupta
  - †Stantonella ripleyana
- †Stephanophyllia
  - †Stephanophyllia cribraria
- Stosicia
  - †Stosicia antiqua
- †Streptacis – tentative report
  - †Streptacis bogradi
- Striarca
  - †Striarca prebrevis
  - †Striarca richardsi
  - †Striarca saffordi
  - †Striarca umbonata
- †Striaticostatum
  - †Striaticostatum asperum
  - †Striaticostatum bexarense
  - †Striaticostatum congestum
  - †Striaticostatum griffini
  - †Striaticostatum harbisoni
  - †Striaticostatum micropunctatum
  - †Striaticostatum sparsum
- Sulcoretusa
  - †Sulcoretusa spinosa
- †Syncyclonema
  - †Syncyclonema simplicius

== T ==
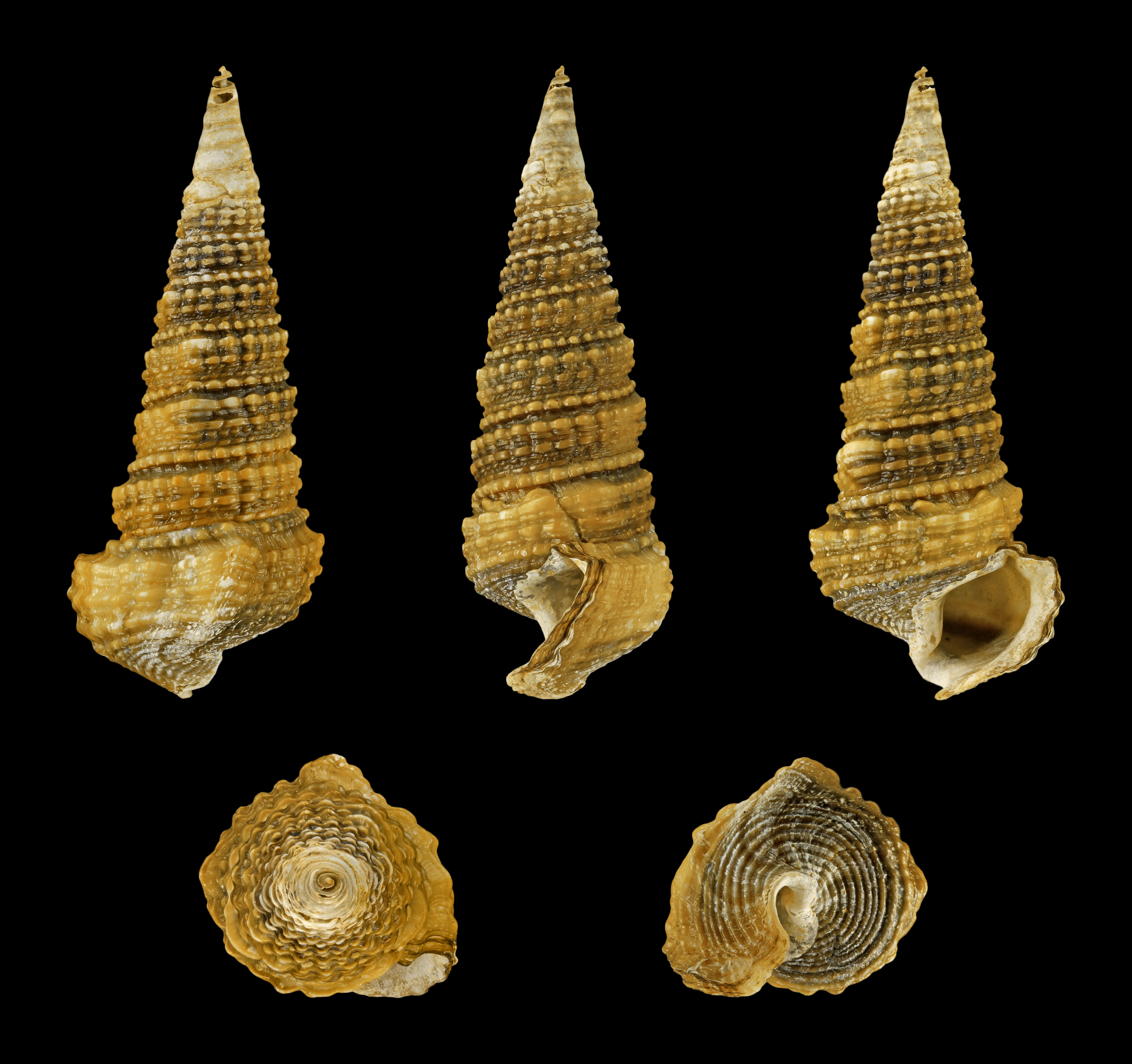
Tympanotonos fuscatus

- Teinostoma
  - †Teinostoma prenanum
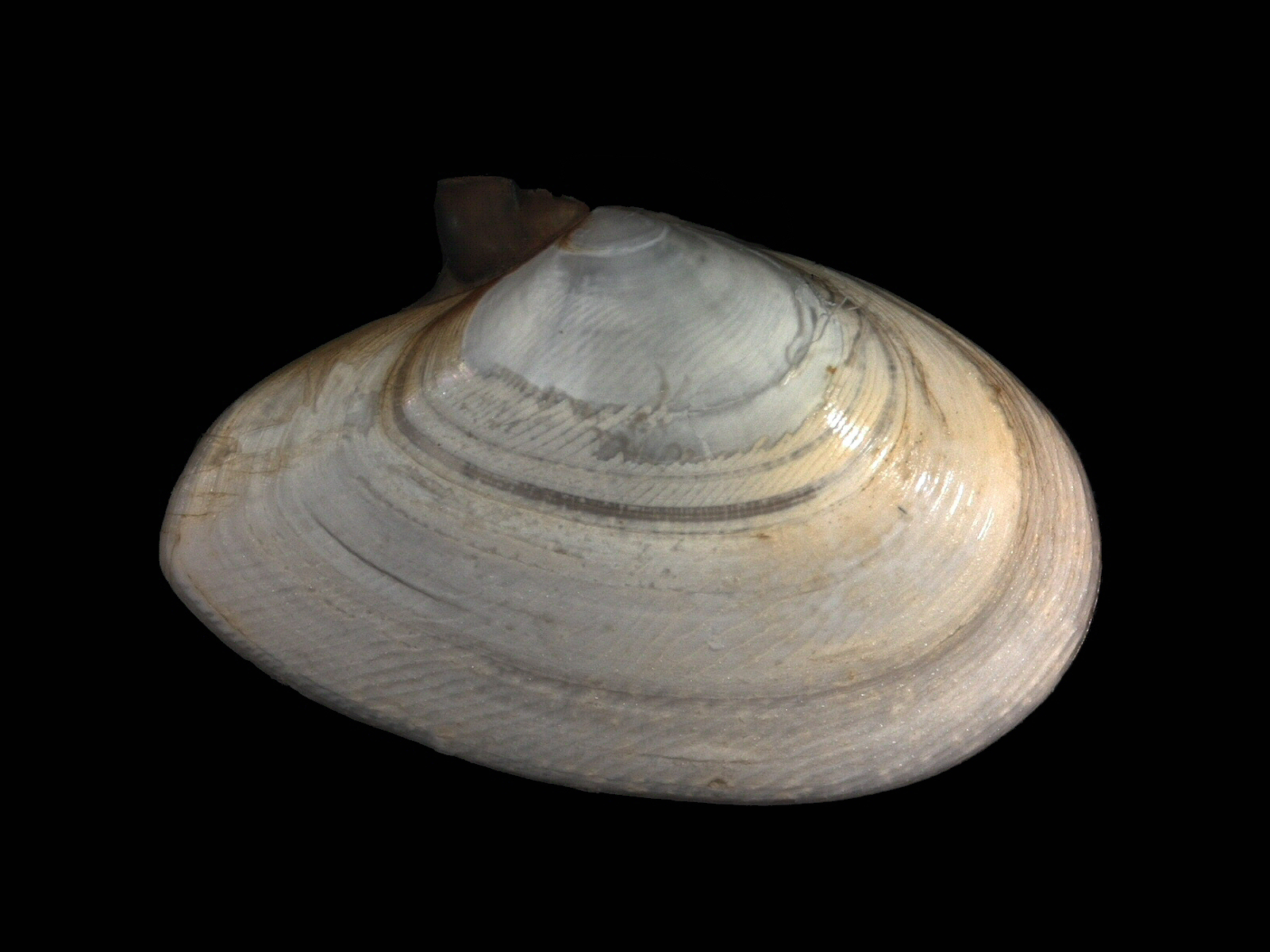
- Shell of a Tellina, or tellin
  Tellina
- †Tellinimera
  - †Tellinimera buboana
  - †Tellinimera gabbi
- †Tenea
  - †Tenea parilis
- †Tenuipteria
  - †Tenuipteria argentea
  - †Tenuipteria argenteus
- †Tetracarcinus
  - †Tetracarcinus subquadratus
- †Texanites
  - †Texanites gallicus
- Thracia
- †Thylacus
  - †Thylacus cretaceus
- †Titanosarcolites
- †Tornatellaea
  - †Tornatellaea cretacea
- †Tornus – tentative report
  - †Tornus planocarinatus
- †Trachybaculites
  - †Trachybaculites columna
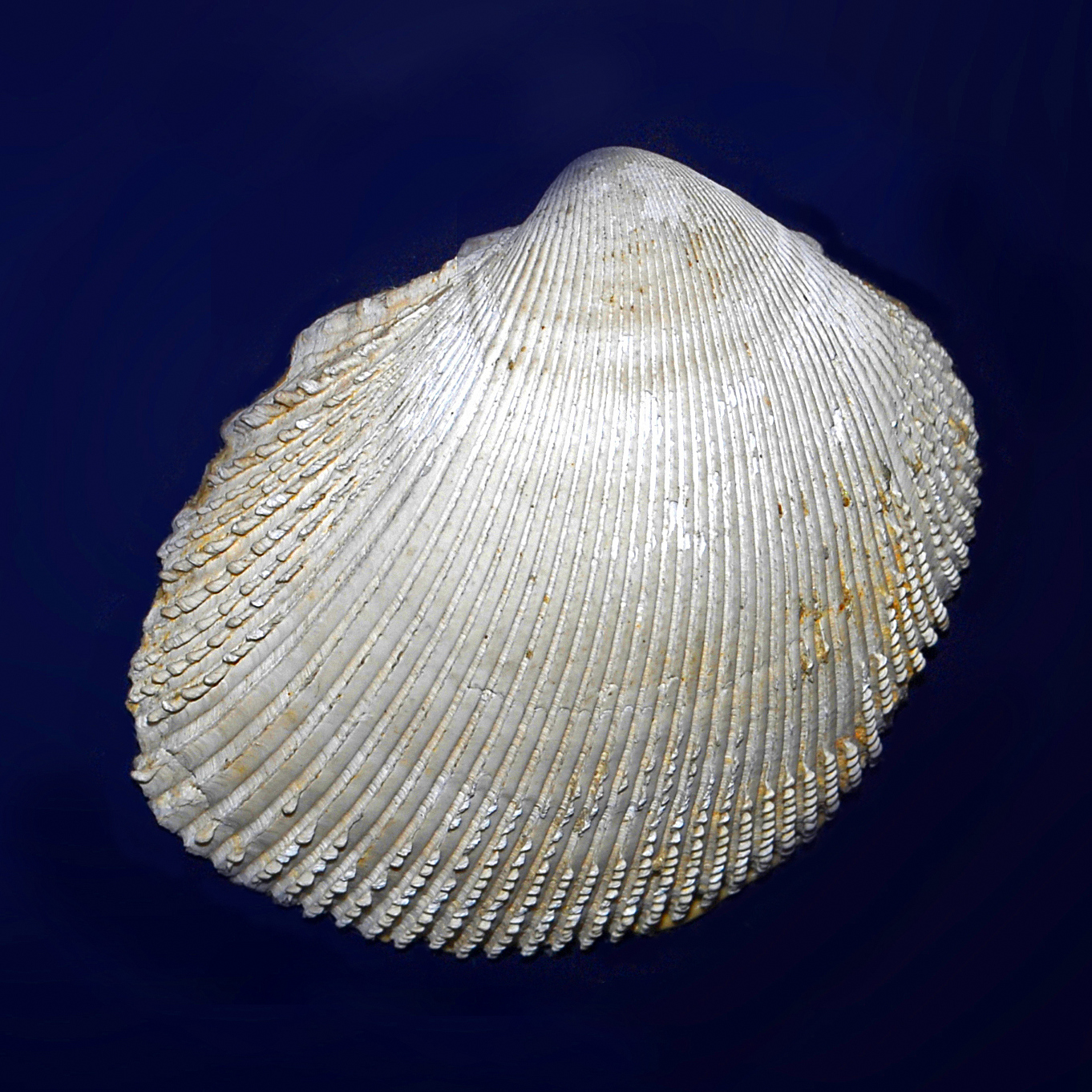
- Fossilized shell of a Trachycardium cockle
  Trachycardium
  - †Trachycardium carolinensis
  - †Trachycardium eufaulensis
- Trichotropis
  - †Trichotropis mississippiensis
  - †Trichotropis squamosa
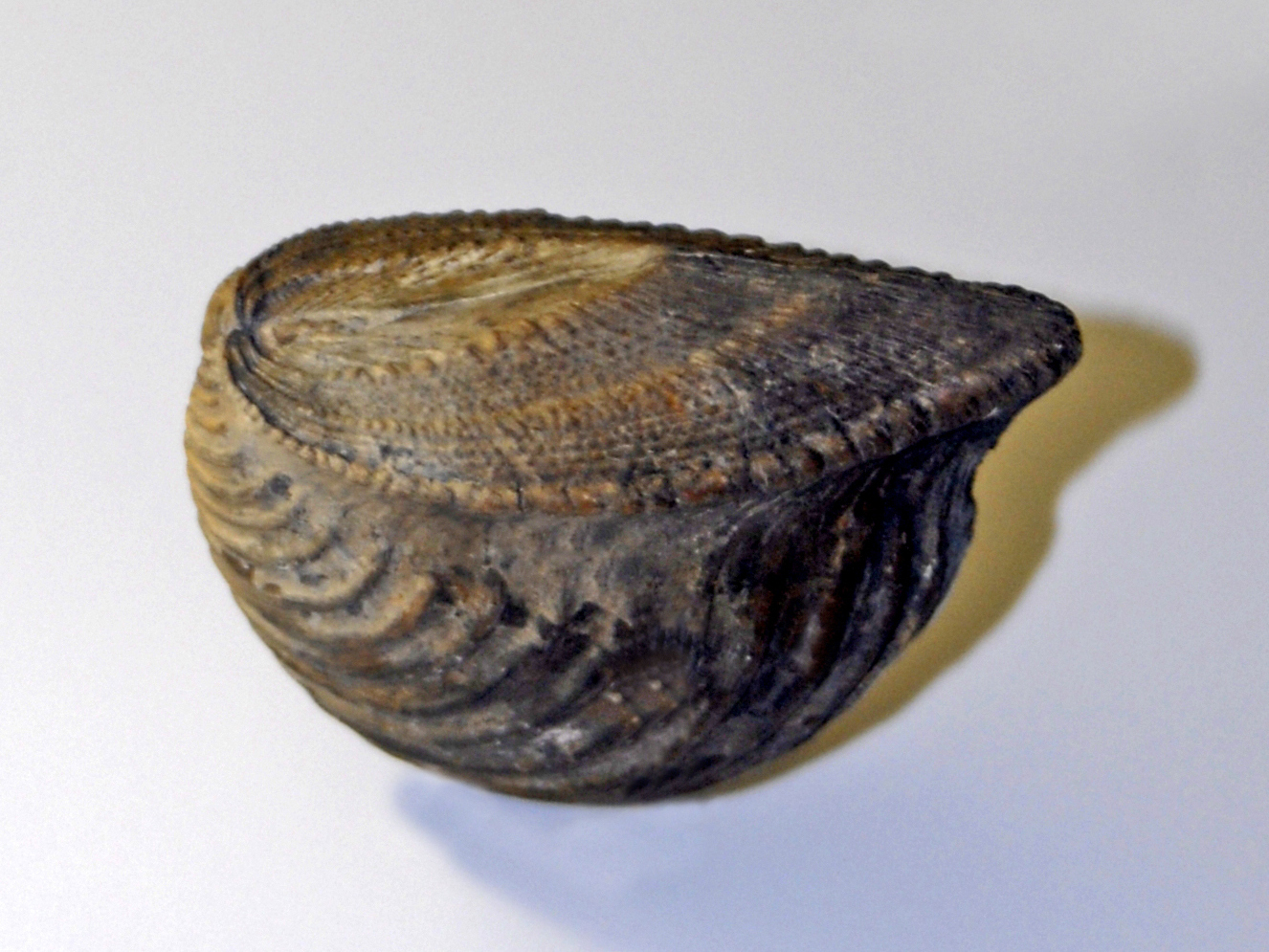
- Fossilized shell of the Permian-Paleocene marine bivalve Trigonia
  †Trigonia
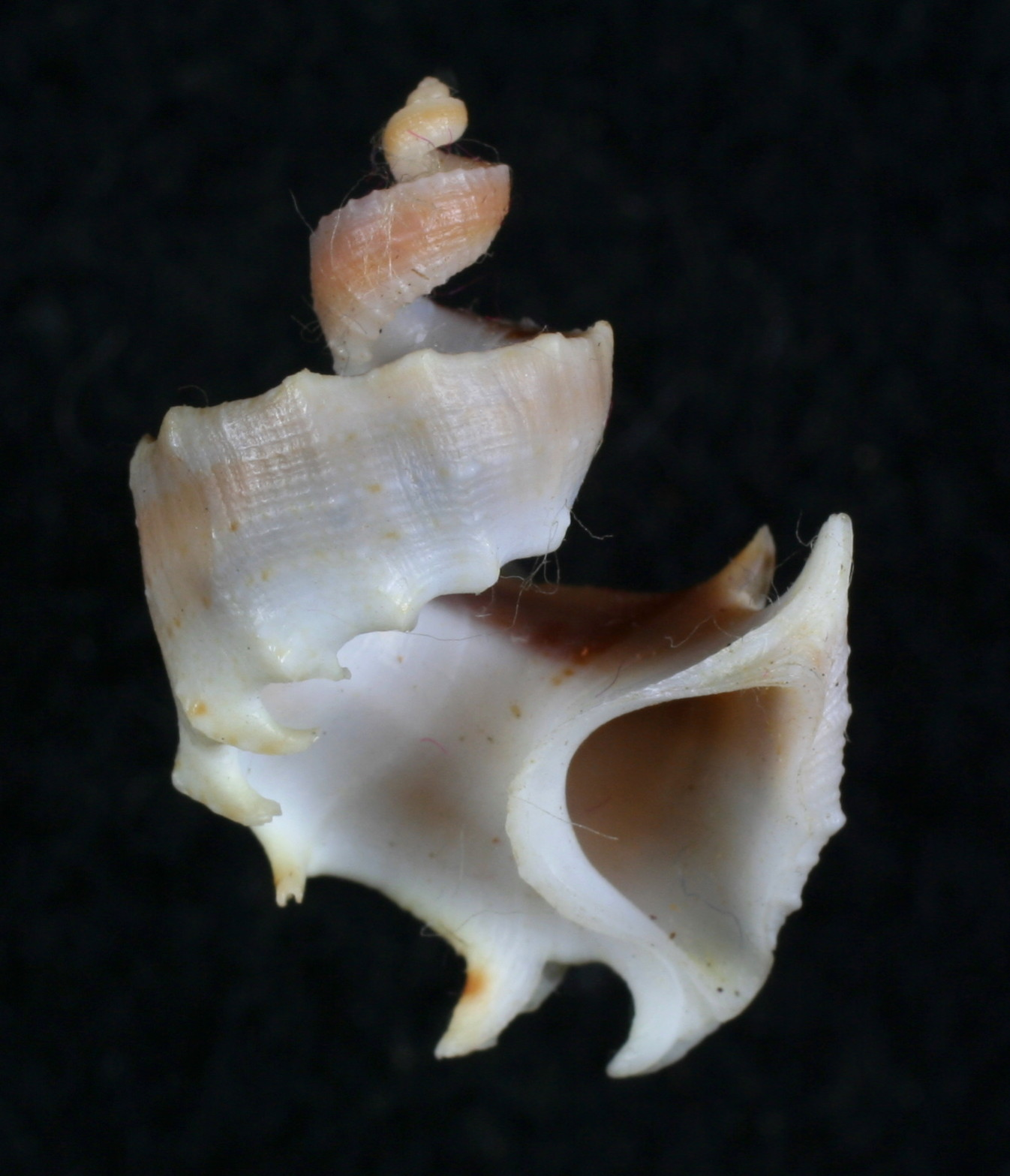
- Shell of a Trigonostoma nutmeg sea snail
  †Trigonostoma
  - †Trigonostoma ripleyana
- †Trobus
  - †Trobus buboanus
  - †Trobus corona
- Trochocyathus
  - †Trochocyathus speciosus – type locality for species
- †Tundora
  - †Tundora tuberculata
- †Turbinopsis
  - †Turbinopsis curta – or unidentified comparable form
- Turboella
  - †Turboella crebricostata
- †Turrilites
  - †Turrilites peruviana – or unidentified comparable form
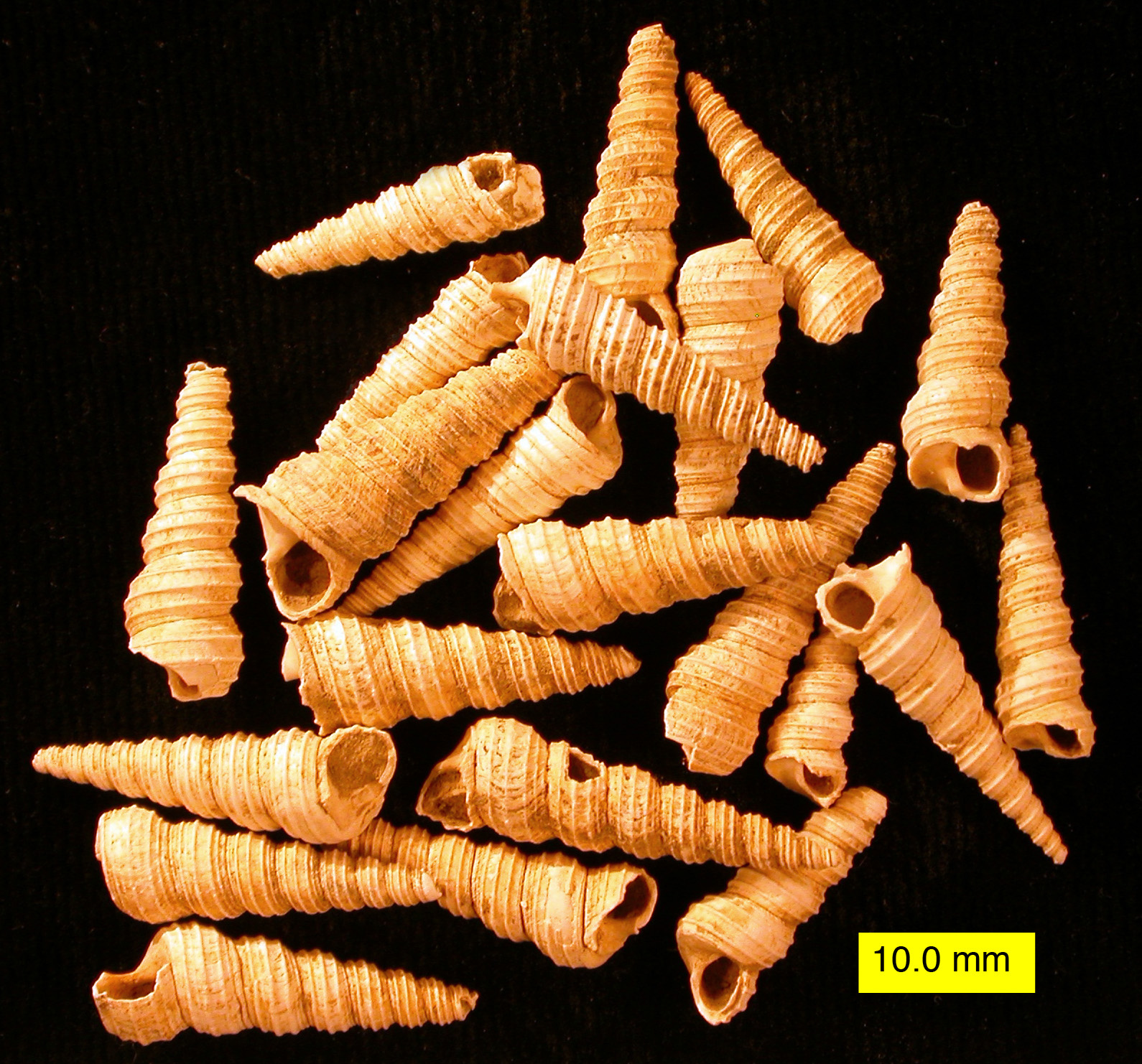
- Fossilized shells of the Late Jurassic-modern tower snail Turritella
  Turritella
  - †Turritella bilira
  - †Turritella chalybeatensis
  - †Turritella chapelvillensis
  - †Turritella hilgardi
  - †Turritella howelli
  - †Turritella paravertebroides
  - †Turritella quadrilira
  - †Turritella tippana
  - †Turritella trilira
  - †Turritella vertebroides
- †Tympanotonus
  - †Tympanotonus trilirus

== U ==
- †Uddenia
- †Unicardium
  - †Unicardium concentricum
- †Urceolabrum
  - †Urceolabrum mantachieensis
  - †Urceolabrum tuberculatum
  - †Urceolabrum tuberculatum callistum

== V ==
- †Variseila
  - †Variseila meeki
- †Veniella
  - †Veniella conradi
- †Vetericardiella
  - †Vetericardiella crenalirata
  - †Vetericardiella webbervillensis
- †Volutomorpha
  - †Volutomorpha aspera
  - †Volutomorpha dumasensis
  - †Volutomorpha producta
  - †Volutomorpha retifera
  - †Volutomorpha splendida
  - †Volutomorpha valida

== W ==
- †Weeksia
  - †Weeksia amplificata
  - †Weeksia deplanata

== X ==
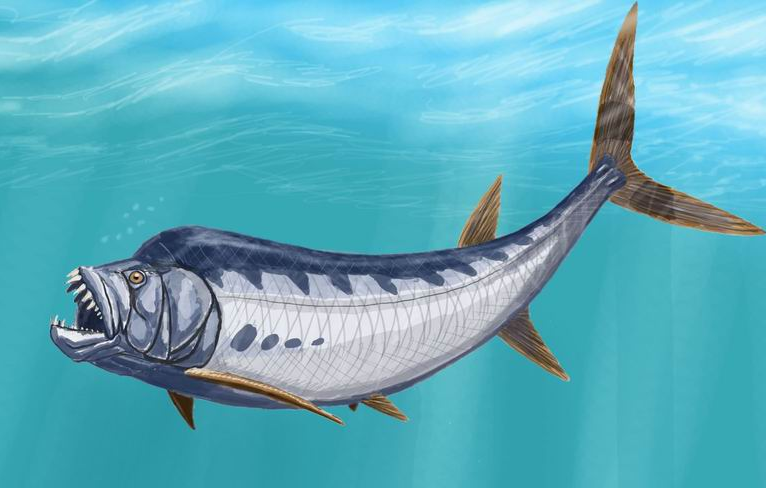
- Life restoration of the Cretaceous bony fish Xiphactinus
  †Xiphactinus
  - †Xiphactinus audax

== Z ==
- †Zikkuratia
  - †Zikkuratia tabanneensis
