= List of the Mesozoic life of South Dakota =

This list of the Mesozoic life of South Dakota contains the various prehistoric life-forms whose fossilized remains have been reported from within the US state of South Dakota and are between 252.17 and 66 million years of age.

== A ==
- Acipenser – or unidentified comparable form
- †Actinocamax
- †Actinosepia
  - †Actinosepia canadensis
- †Adocus
- †Agerostrea
  - †Agerostrea translucida
- †Allosaurus
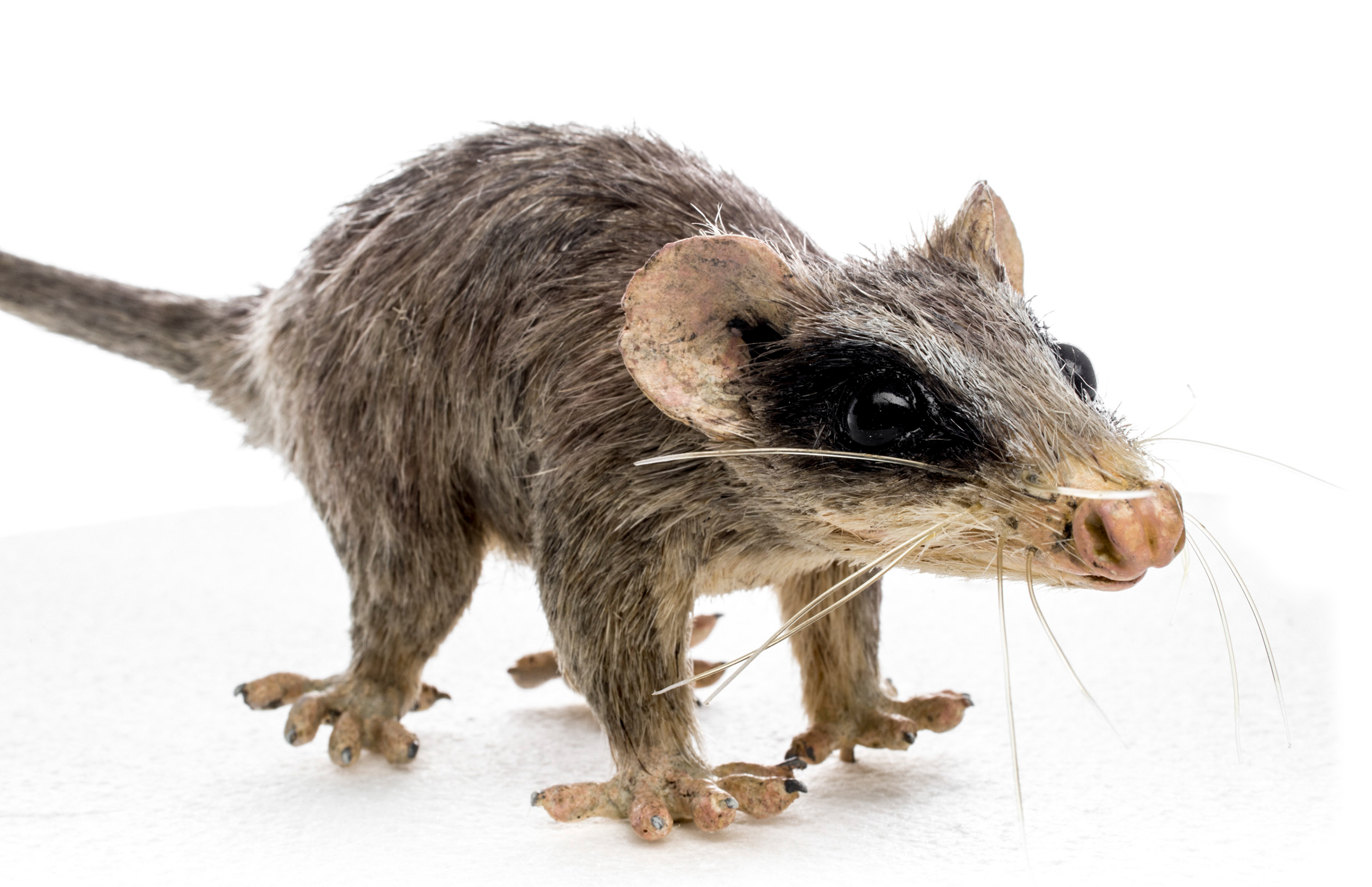
- Restorative model of the Late Cretaceous mammal Alphadon
  †Alphadon
  - †Alphadon marshi
- †Amesoneuron
  - †Amesoneuron FU37 – informal
- †Anatotitan
  - †Anatotitan copei
- †Anisomyon
- †Anomia
  - †Anomia gryphorhyncha
- †Antillocaprina
- †Anzu – type locality for genus
  - †Anzu wyliei – type locality for species
- †Apatosaurus
- †Araucarioxylon
  - †Araucarioxylon hoppertonae – type locality for species
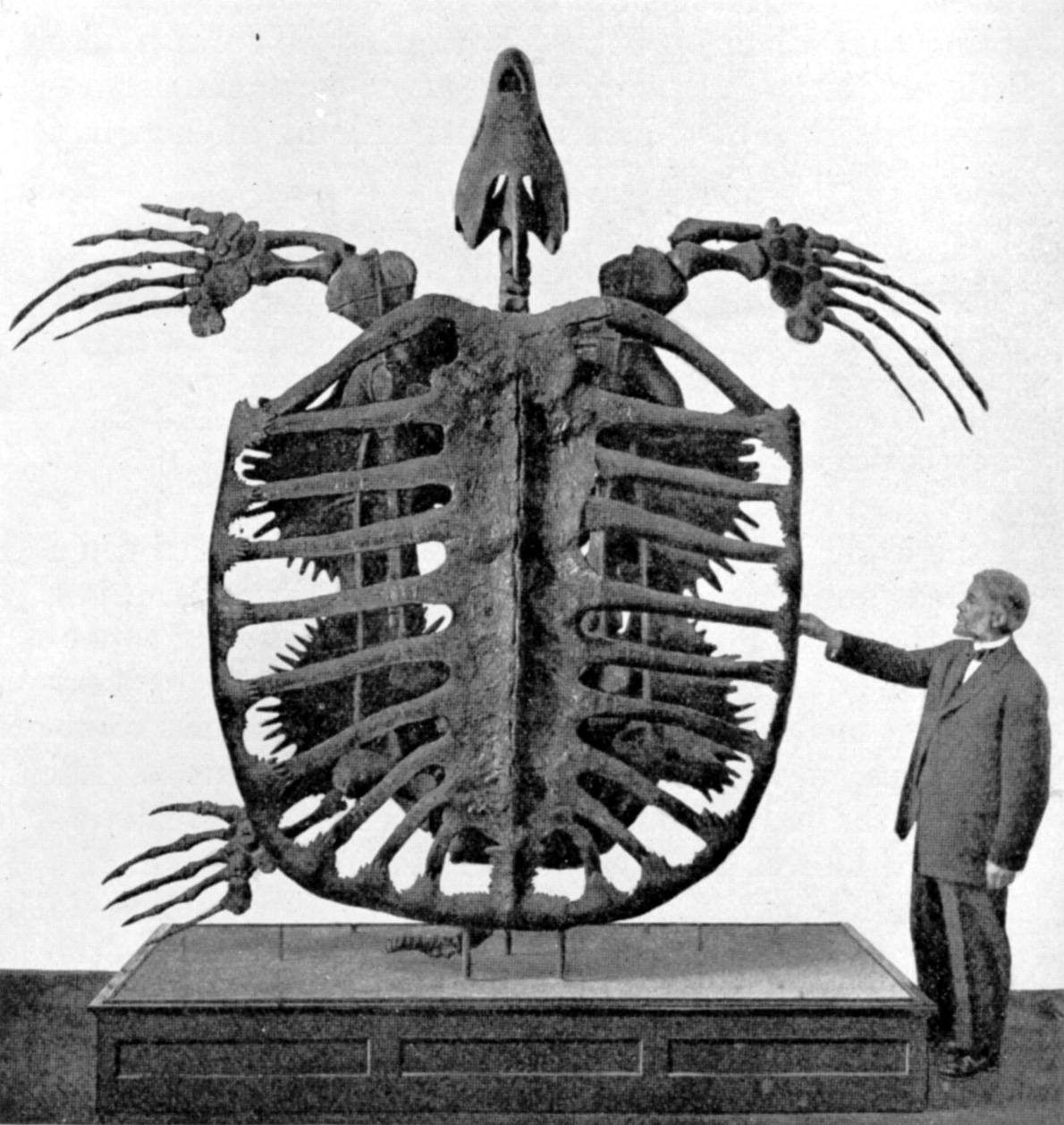
- Mounted fossilized skeleton of the Late Cretaceous sea turtle Archelon
  †Archelon – type locality for genus
  - †Archelon ischryos
  - †Archelon ischyros – type locality for species
- †Artocarpus – report made of unidentified related form or using admittedly obsolete nomenclature
  - †Artocarpus lessigiana
- Aspideretes
- †Asplenium
  - †Asplenium Dicksonianum
- †Axestemys – or unidentified comparable form
  - †Axestemys splendida

== B ==
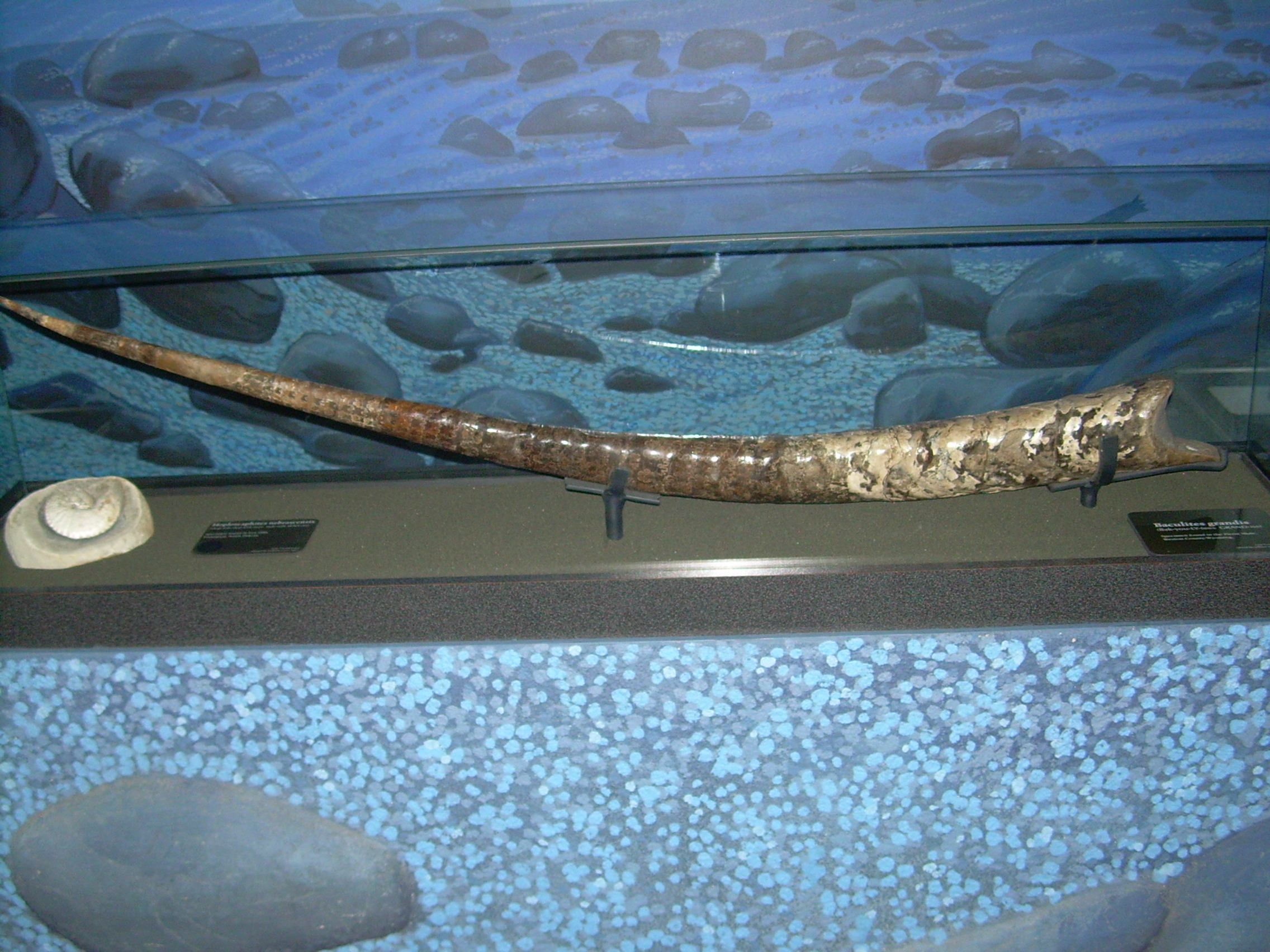
- Fossilized shell of the Late Cretaceous ammonoid cephalopod Baculites
  †Baculites
  - †Baculites clinolobatus
  - †Baculites compressus
  - †Baculites grandis
  - †Baculites larsoni
  - †Baculites ovatus
  - †Baculites yokoyamai
- †Bananogmius
  - †Bananogmius evolutus
- †Baptornis
  - †Baptornis varneri – type locality for species
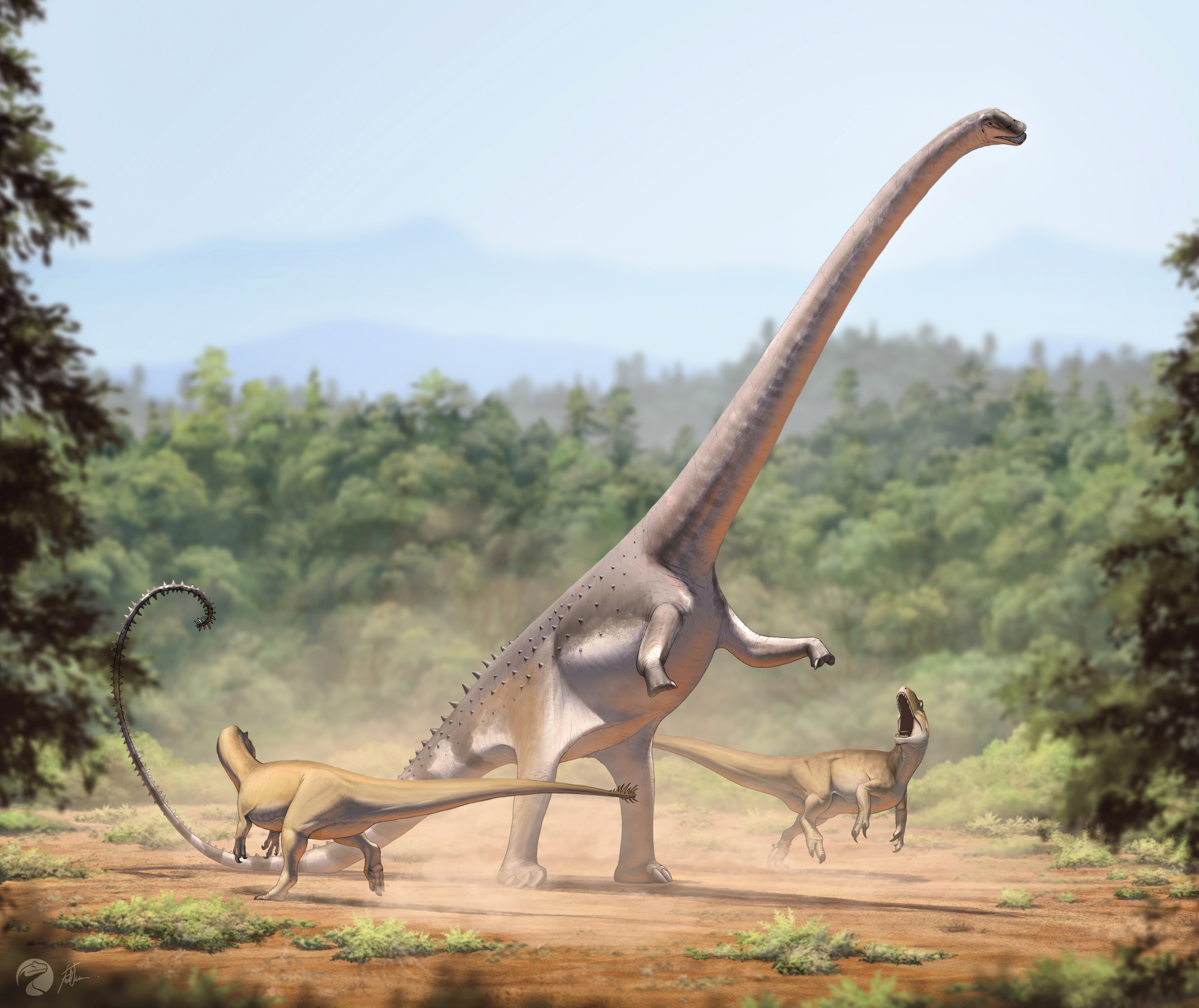
- Restoration of the Late Jurassic sauropod dinosaur Barosaurus rearing to defend itself against a pair of the theropod Allosaurus
  †Barosaurus – type locality for genus
  - †Barosaurus lentus – type locality for species
- †Basilemys
  - †Basilemys sinuosa
- †Belemnitella
  - †Belemnitella bulbosa
- Beryx – or unidentified related form
- †Binneyites
  - †Binneyites carlilensis
- †Bisonia
  - †Bisonia niemii
- †Bolodon
  - †Bolodon hydei – type locality for species
- †Borealosuchus
  - †Borealosuchus sternbergii
- †Borissiakoceras – tentative report
- Brachidontes
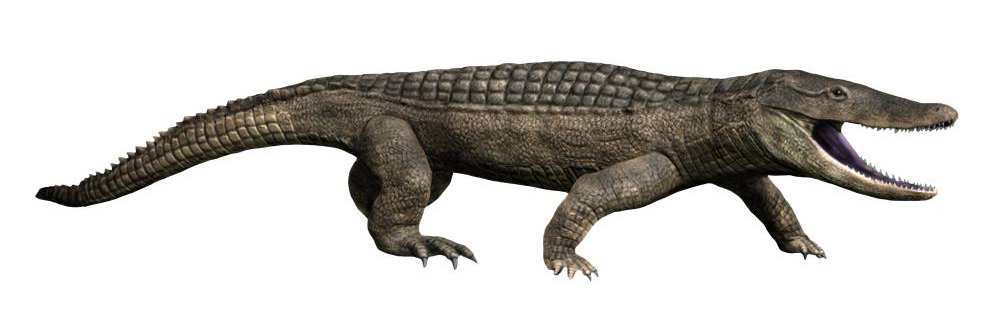
- Life restoration of the Late Cretaceous Alligator relative Brachychampsa
  †Brachychampsa
  - †Brachychampsa montana
- †Brodavis
  - †Brodavis baileyi – type locality for species
- †Bubodens – type locality for genus
  - †Bubodens magnus – type locality for species

== C ==
- †Caenagnathus
- †Calycoceras
  - †Calycoceras boreale – type locality for species
  - †Calycoceras dromense – or unidentified comparable form
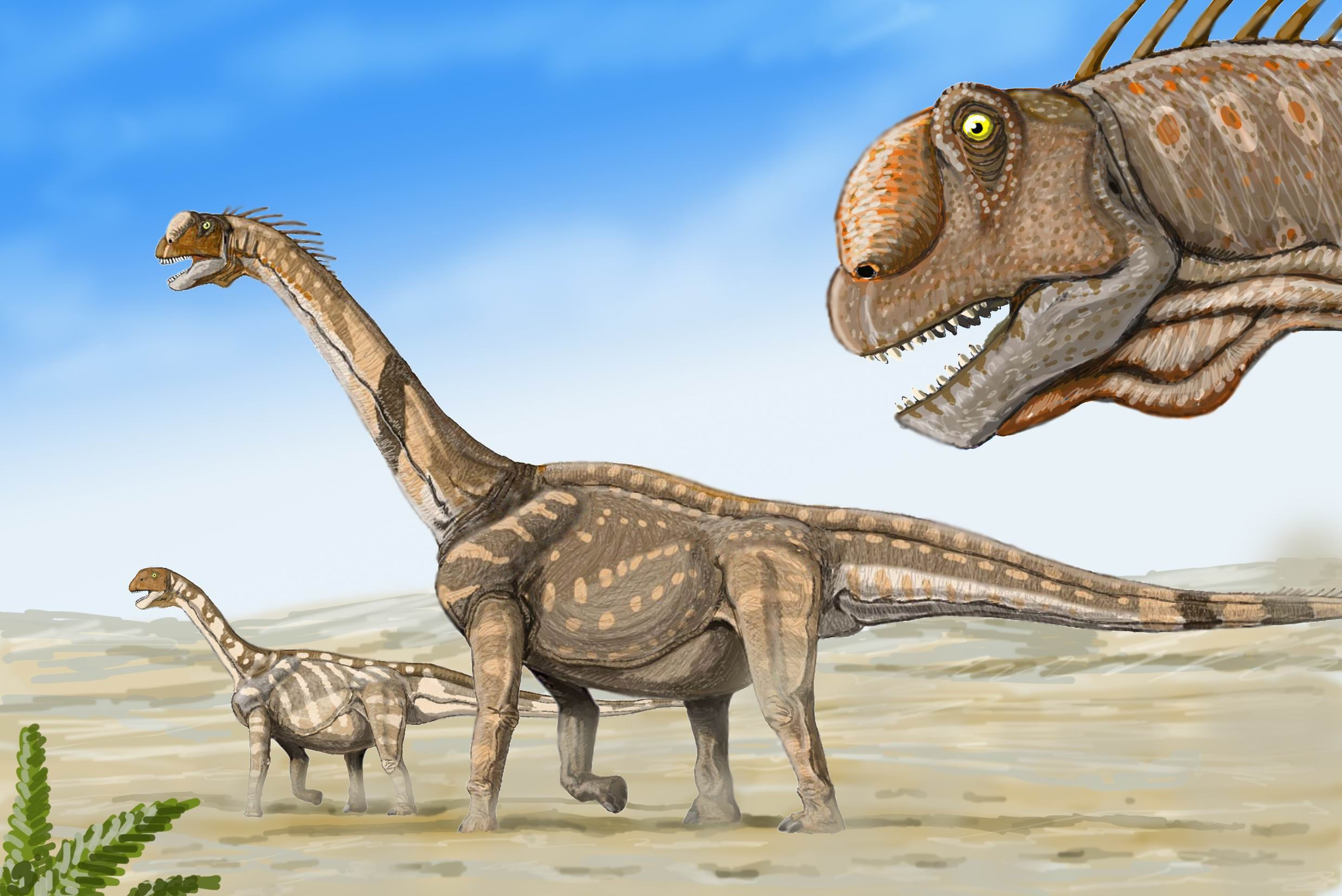
- Life restoration of a herd of the Late Jurassic sauropod dinosaur Camarasaurus
  †Camarasaurus
- Campeloma
- †Camptonectes
  - †Camptonectes hallii
- †Carabites
  - †Carabites russelli – type locality for species
- †Cataceramus – or unidentified comparable form
  - †Cataceramus tenuilineatus
- †Caturus
  - †Caturus dartoni – type locality for species
- †Celastrophyllum
  - †Celastrophyllum pulchrum – type locality for species
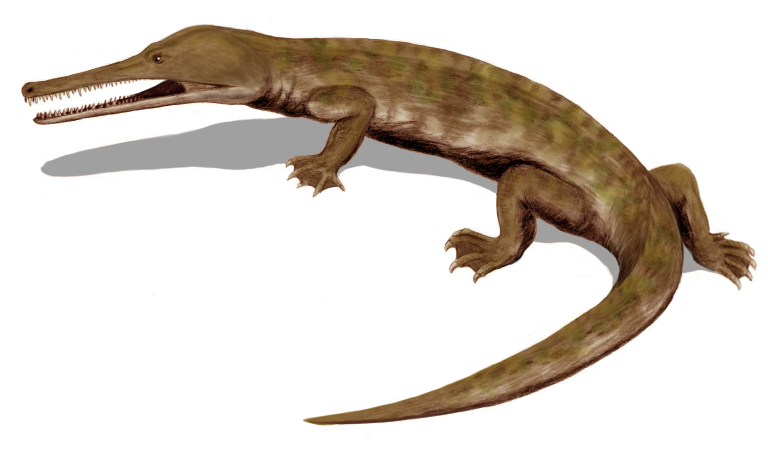
- Life restoration of the Late Cretaceous-Eocene choristoderan reptile Champsosaurus
  †Champsosaurus
- †Cimexomys
- †Cimolodon
  - †Cimolodon nitidus
- †Cimolomys
  - †Cimolomys gracilis
- †Cissites
  - †Cissites ingens
  - †Cissites salisburiaefolius
- †Claibornites
  - †Claibornites cedrensis
- †Claosaurus
  - †Claosaurus affinis – type locality for species
- †Clavipholas
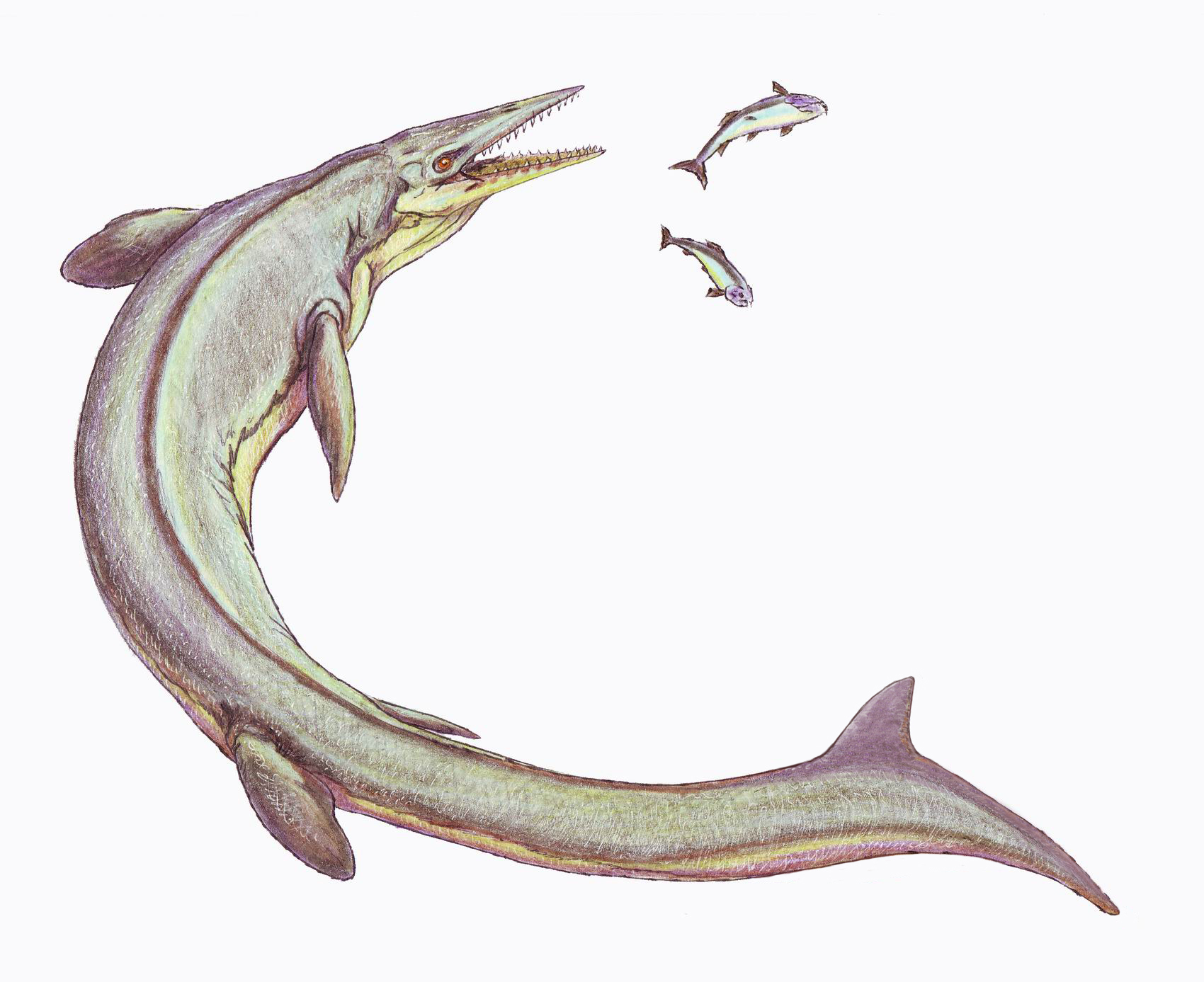
- Life restoration of the Late Cretaceous mosasaurid Clidastes
  †Clidastes
  - †Clidastes propython
- †Clisocolus
  - †Clisocolus moreauensis
- †Cocculus
  - †Cocculus flabella
- †Collignoniceras
  - †Collignoniceras collisniger – type locality for species
  - †Collignoniceras jorgenseni – type locality for species
  - †Collignoniceras percarinatum
  - †Collignoniceras praecox
  - †Collignoniceras vermilionense
  - †Collignoniceras woolgari
  - †Collignoniceras woollgari
- †Compsemys
  - †Compsemys victa
- Corbula
  - †Corbula crassimarginata
- †Corbulamella
  - †Corbulamella gregaria
- †Crassatellina
  - †Crassatellina hollandi
- †Crenella
  - †Crenella elegantula
- †Cretodus
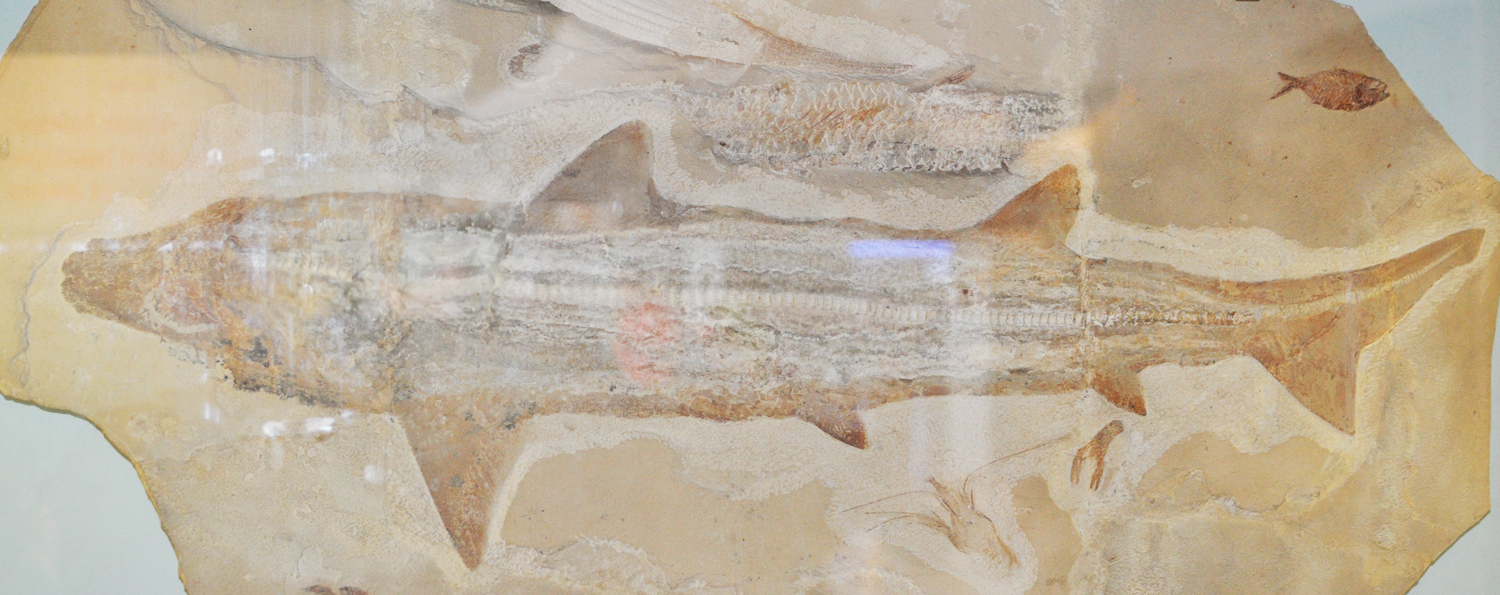
- Fossil of the Early Cretaceous-Eocene shark Cretolamna
  †Cretolamna
  - †Cretolamna appendiculata
- †Cteniogenys
  - †Cteniogenys antiquus
- Cucullaea
  - †Cucullaea nebrascensis
- †Cupressinocladus
  - †Cupressinocladus interruptus
- †Curculionites
  - †Curculionites hylobioides – type locality for species
  - †Curculionites northropi – type locality for species
  - †Curculionites vulpinus – type locality for species
- †Cuspidaria
  - †Cuspidaria moreauensis
  - †Cuspidaria ventricosa
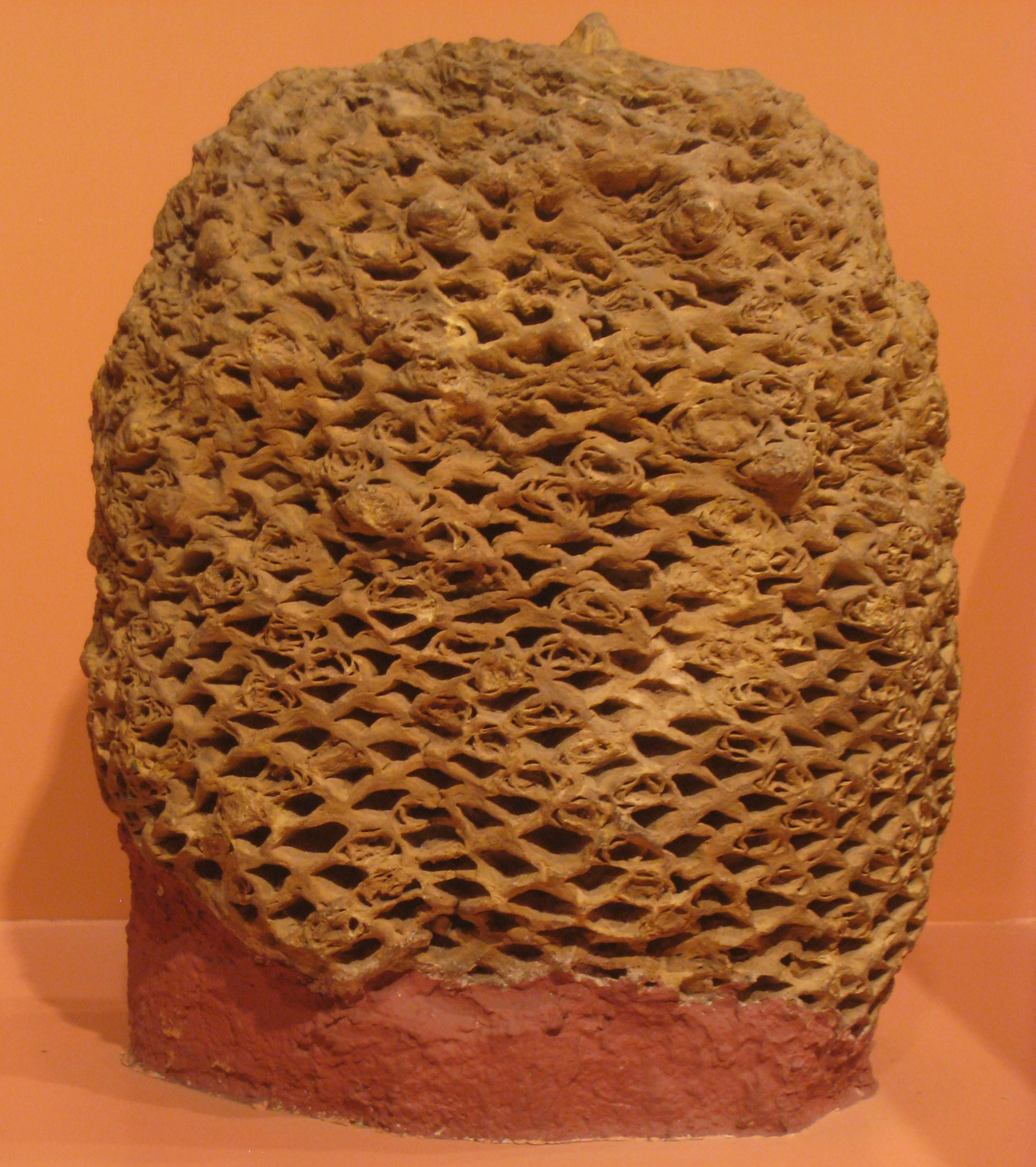
- Fossil of the Jurassic-Cretaceous cycad relative Cycadeoidea
  †Cycadeoidea
  - †Cycadeoidea aspera – type locality for species
  - †Cycadeoidea cicatricula – type locality for species
  - †Cycadeoidea colei – type locality for species
  - †Cycadeoidea colossalis – type locality for species
  - †Cycadeoidea dacotensis
  - †Cycadeoidea excelsa – type locality for species
  - †Cycadeoidea formosa – type locality for species
  - †Cycadeoidea furcata – type locality for species
  - †Cycadeoidea ingens – type locality for species
  - †Cycadeoidea insolita – type locality for species
  - †Cycadeoidea jenneyana
  - †Cycadeoidea Jenneyana
  - †Cycadeoidea marshiana – type locality for species
  - †Cycadeoidea mcbridei – type locality for species
  - †Cycadeoidea McBridei – type locality for species
  - †Cycadeoidea minnekahtensis – type locality for species
  - †Cycadeoidea nana – type locality for species
  - †Cycadeoidea occidentalis – type locality for species
  - †Cycadeoidea paynei – type locality for species
  - †Cycadeoidea pulcherrima – type locality for species
  - †Cycadeoidea stillwelli – type locality for species
  - †Cycadeoidea turrita – type locality for species
  - †Cycadeoidea Wellsii – type locality for species
- †Cyclurus
  - †Cyclurus fragosus
- †Cymbophora
  - †Cymbophora warrenana
- Cyrtodaria
  - †Cyrtodaria minuta

== D ==
- †Dakotadon
  - †Dakotadon lakotaensis
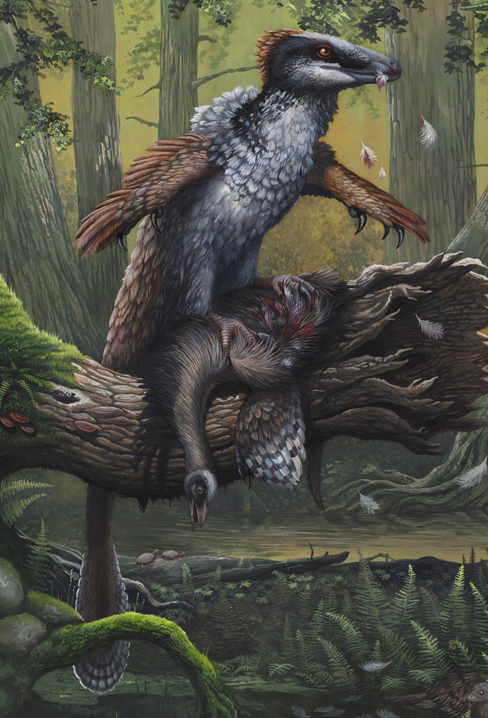
- Restoration of the Late Cretaceous dromaeosaurid ("raptor") Dakotaraptor preying upon an ostrich dinosaur
  †Dakotaraptor – type locality for genus
  - †Dakotaraptor steini – type locality for species
- †Dakoticancer
  - †Dakoticancer overanus
- †Delphodon
  - †Delphodon comptus – or unidentified comparable form
- †Desmatochelys
  - †Desmatochelys lowi
- †Didelphodon
  - †Didelphodon vorax – or unidentified comparable form
- †Diplodocus
- †Discoscaphites
  - †Discoscaphites conradi
  - †Discoscaphites gulosus
  - †Discoscaphites rossi – type locality for species
- †Dolichorhynchops
  - †Dolichorhynchops osborni
- †Dosiniopsis
  - †Dosiniopsis deweyi
- †Drepanochilus
  - †Drepanochilus evansi
- †Dryophyllum
  - †Dryophyllum subfalcatum
  - †Dryophyllum tenneseensis
- †Dunveganoceras
  - †Dunveganoceras pondi

== E ==
- †Edmontonia
  - †Edmontonia longiceps
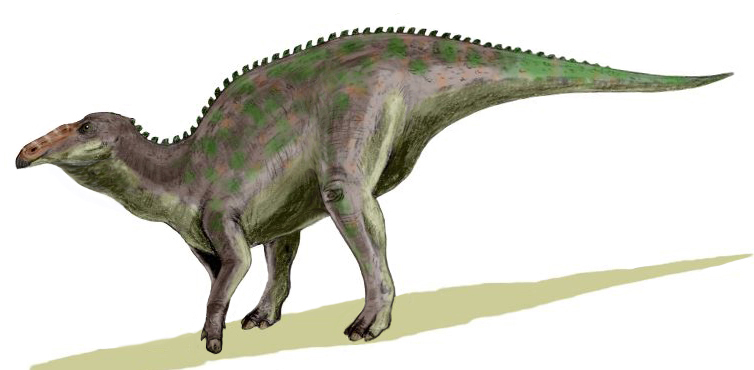
- Life restoration of the Late Cretaceous duck-billed dinosaur Edmontosaurus annectens
  †Edmontosaurus
- †Elasmosaurus
  - †Elasmosaurus intermedius – type locality for species
- †Elatides
  - †Elatides longifolia
- †Ellipsoscapha
- †Embaphias – type locality for genus
  - †Embaphias circulosus – type locality for species
- †Enchodus
- †Erlingdorfia
  - †Erlingdorfia montana
- †Ethmocardium
  - †Ethmocardium welleri
- †Eubostrychoceras
  - †Eubostrychoceras matsumotoi
- †Eucalycoceras
  - †Eucalycoceras pentagonum
- †Eutrephoceras
  - †Eutrephoceras dekayi

== F ==
- †Fokieniopsis
  - †Fokieniopsis catenulata

== G ==
- †Galagadon – type locality for genus
  - †Galagadon nordquistae – type locality for species
- †Geosternbergia
  - †Geosternbergia maiseyi – type locality for species
- Gleichenia
  - †Gleichenia Zippei
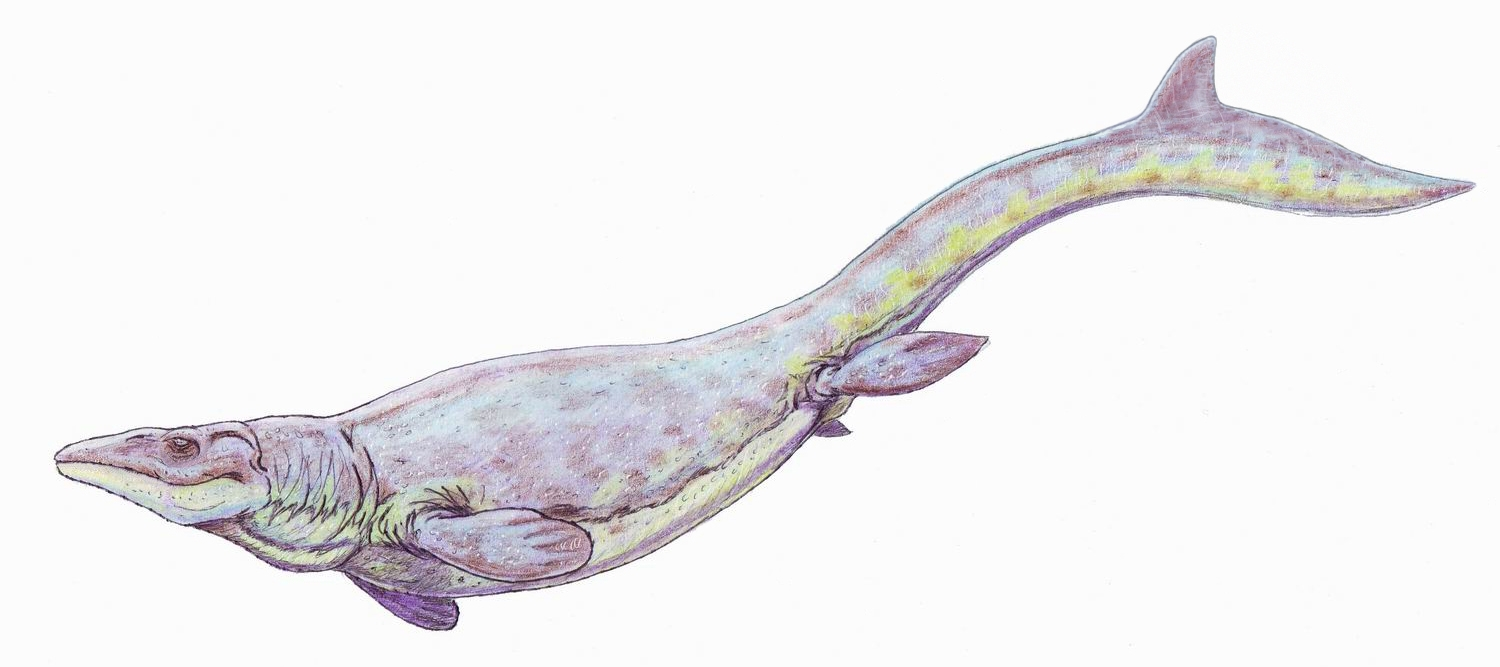
- Life restoration of the Late Cretaceous mosasaur Globidens
  †Globidens
  - †Globidens alabamensis
  - †Globidens dakotensis – type locality for species
  - †Globidens schurmanni – type locality for species
- †Glossozamites
  - †Glossozamites Fontaineanus – type locality for species
- †Glyptops
- Glyptostrobus
  - †Glyptostrobus europaeus
- †Goniomya
  - †Goniomya americana
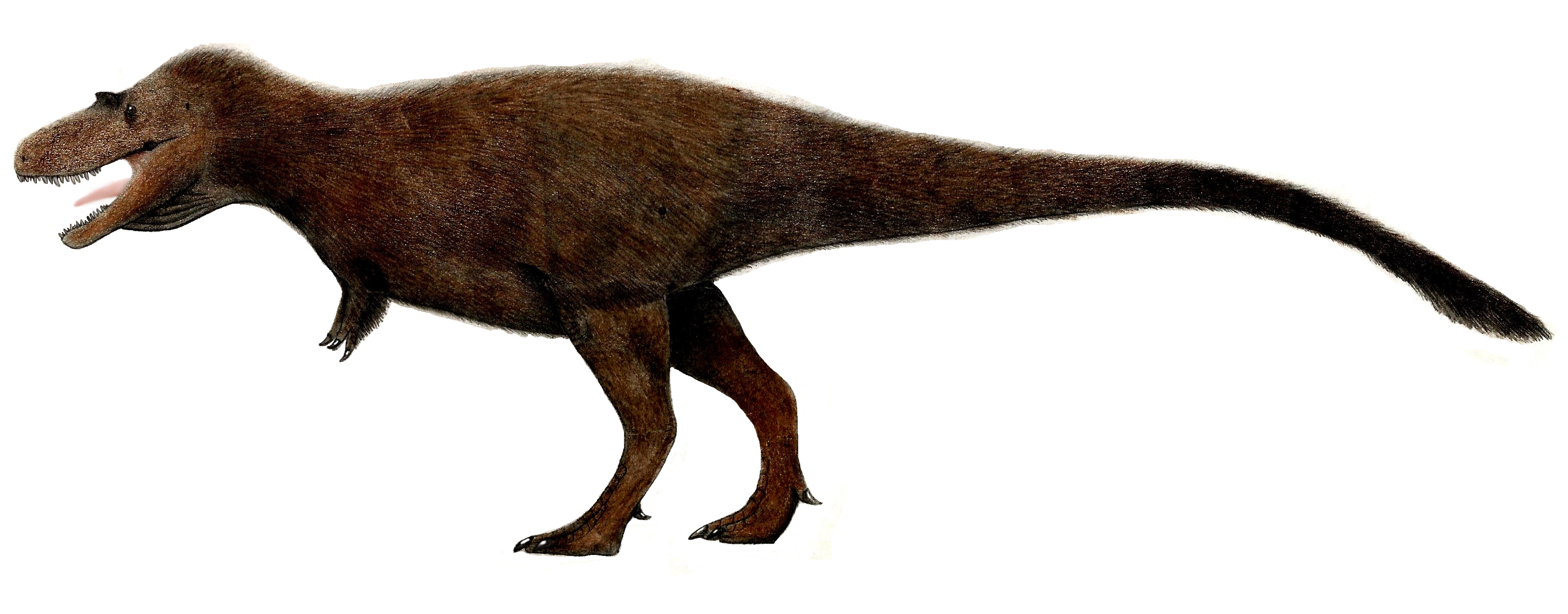
- Life restoration of the Late Cretaceous tyrannosaur Gorgosaurus
  †Gorgosaurus
- †Grammatodon
  - †Grammatodon sulcatinus
- †Granocardium
  - †Granocardium whitei
- †Graphidula
  - †Graphidula culbertsoni
- †Grewiopsis
  - †Grewiopsis saportana
- †Gypsonictops
  - †Gypsonictops hypoconus
- †Gyrostrea
  - †Gyrostrea subtrigonalis

== H ==
- †Hainosaurus
  - †Hainosaurus neumilleri – type locality for species
- †Hamites
  - †Hamites cimarronensis
- †Helopanoplia
  - †Helopanoplia distincta
- Hemiaster
  - †Hemiaster beecheri
- †Hercorhynchus
  - †Hercorhynchus hollandi
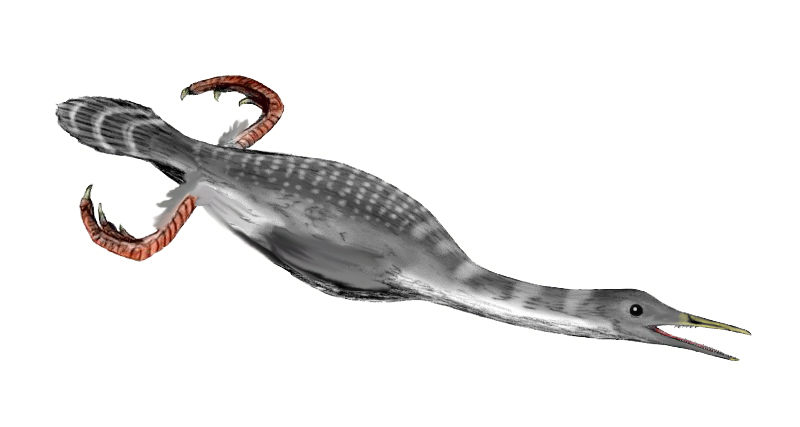
- Life restoration of the Late Cretaceous toothed bird Hesperornis
  †Hesperornis
  - †Hesperornis regalis – or unidentified comparable form
- Hiatella – tentative report
- †Hindsiella
  - †Hindsiella corsonensis
- †Hoplitosaurus
  - †Hoplitosaurus marshi – type locality for species
- †Hoploparia
- †Hoploscaphites
  - †Hoploscaphites comprimus
  - †Hoploscaphites melloi – type locality for species
  - †Hoploscaphites nicolletii
- †Hulettia
  - †Hulettia americana – type locality for species
- †Hypoxytoma
  - †Hypoxytoma nebrascana
- †Hypsilophodon
  - †Hypsilophodon wielandi – type locality for species

== I ==
- †Ichthyodectes
- †Infernolestes – type locality for genus
  - †Infernolestes rougieri – type locality for species
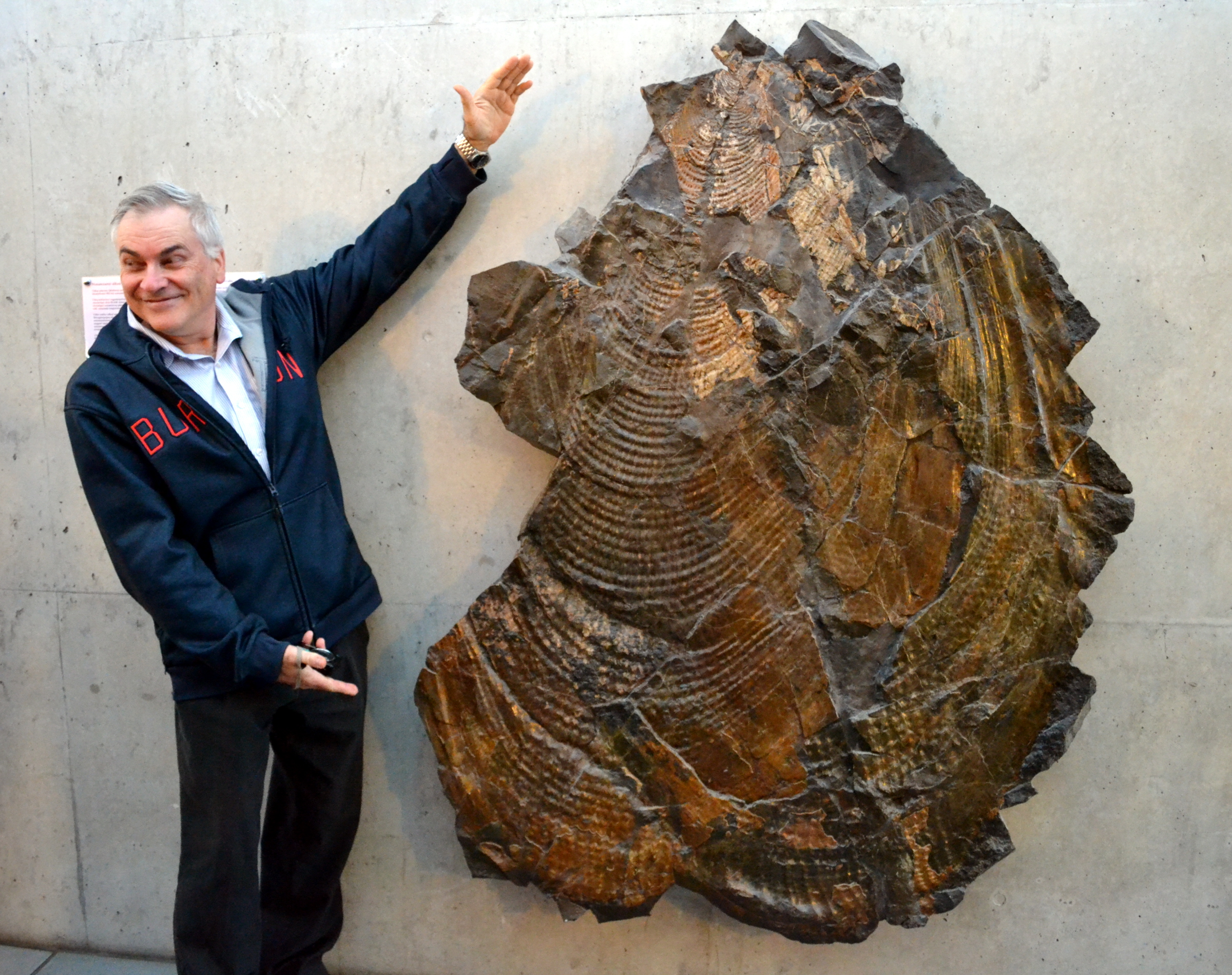
- Fossilized shell of the Early Jurassic-Late Cretaceous marine bivalve Inoceramus with a human indicating its size
  †Inoceramus
  - †Inoceramus apicalis
  - †Inoceramus ginterensis
  - †Inoceramus tenuis – or unidentified related form
  - †Inoceramus tenuistriatus – tentative report
- †Ischyodus
  - †Ischyodus rayhaasi
- Isurus

== J ==
- †Jeletskytes
  - †Jeletskytes nodosus
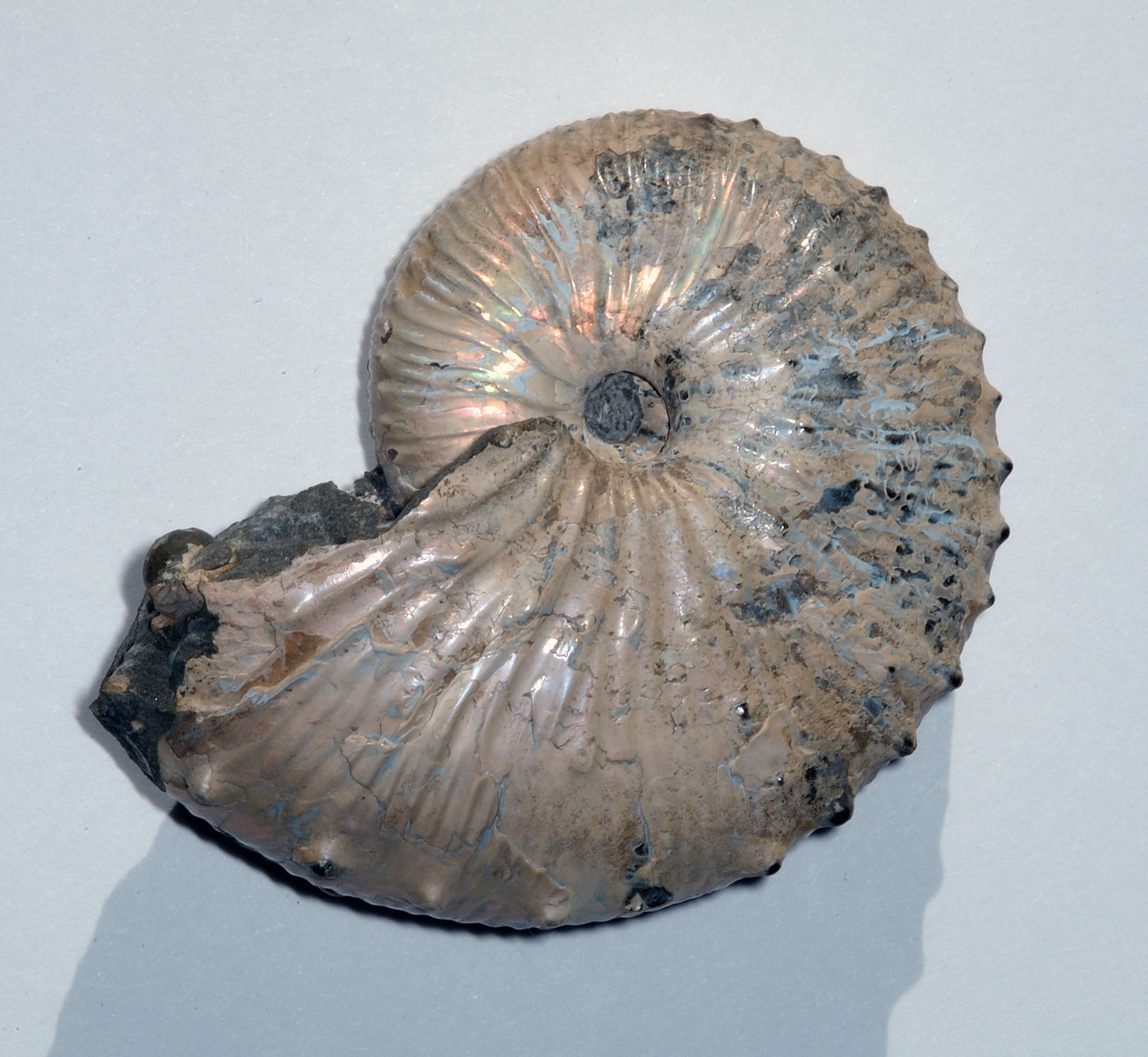
- Fossilized shell of the Late Cretaceous ammonoid cephalopod Jeletzkytes
  †Jeletzkytes
  - †Jeletzkytes dorfi
  - †Jeletzkytes nebrascensis
  - †Jeletzkytes spedeni – type locality for species
- Juliacorbula
  - †Juliacorbula crassimarginata
- Jupiteria
  - †Jupiteria scitula

== L ==
- †Lakotalestes – type locality for genus
  - †Lakotalestes luoi – type locality for species
- Lamna
- †Laurophyllum
  - †Laurophyllum wardiana
- †Leepierceia
  - †Leepierceia preartocarpoides
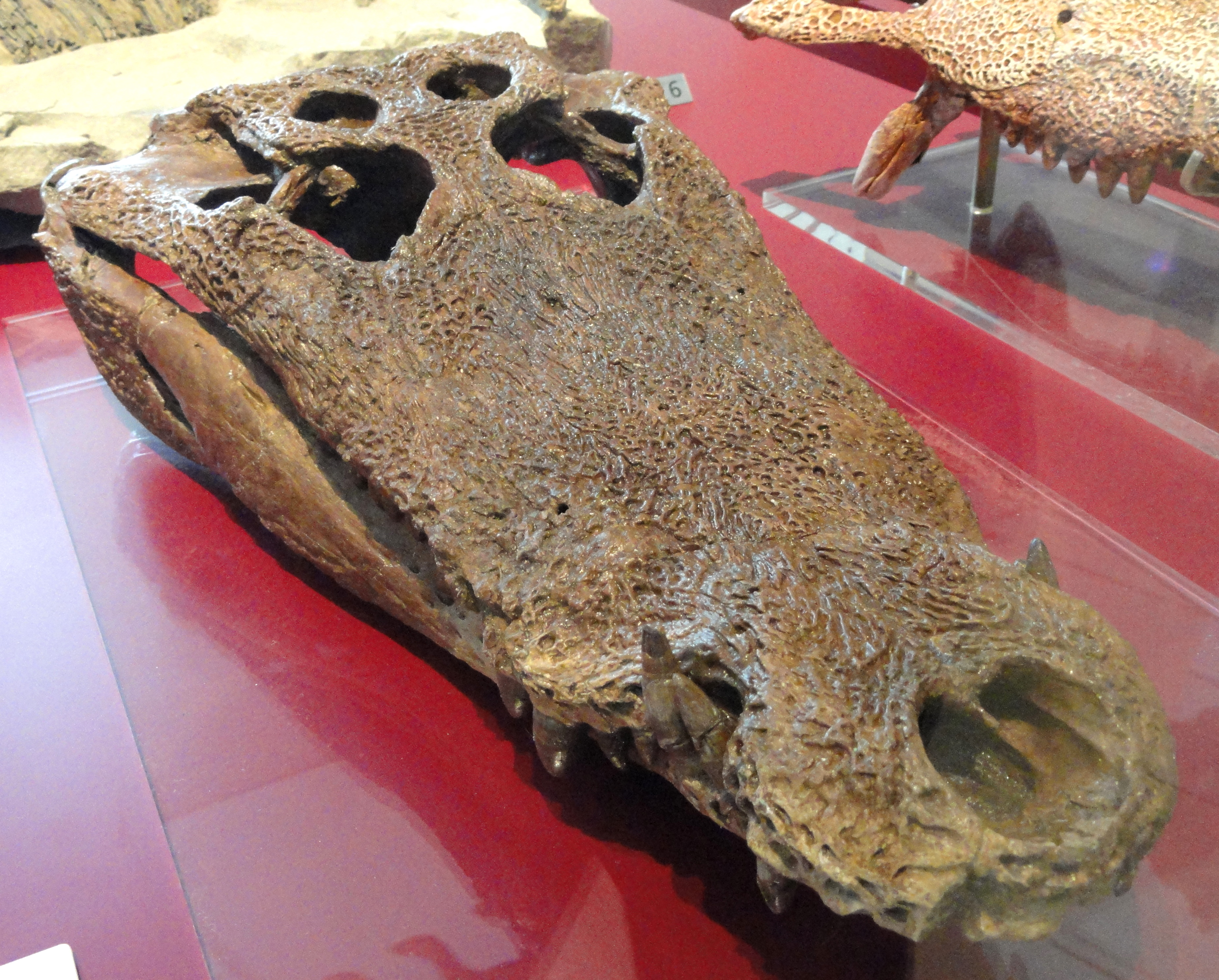
- Fossilized skull of the Late Cretaceous alligator relative Leidyosuchus
  †Leidyosuchus
- †Lemnaceae
  - †Lemnaceae scutatum
- †Lepidotes – tentative report
  - †Lepidotes lacotanus
- Lepisosteus
  - †Lepisosteus occidentalis
- †Leptalestes
  - †Leptalestes cooki
  - †Leptalestes krejcii
- †Leptosolen
- Limopsis
  - †Limopsis striatopunctatus
- †Lioplacodes
- †Lucina – tentative report

== M ==
- Malletia
  - †Malletia evansi
- †Marmarthia
  - †Marmarthia pearsonii
  - †Marmarthia trivialis
- †Martinectes
  - †Martinectes bonneri
- †Melvius
  - †Melvius thomasi
- †Meniscoessus
  - †Meniscoessus robustus
- †Mesodma
  - †Mesodma formosa
  - †Mesodma hensleighi
  - †Mesodma thompsoni
- †Modiolus
  - †Modiolus attenuatus – or unidentified related form
  - †Modiolus galpinianus
  - †Modiolus meeki
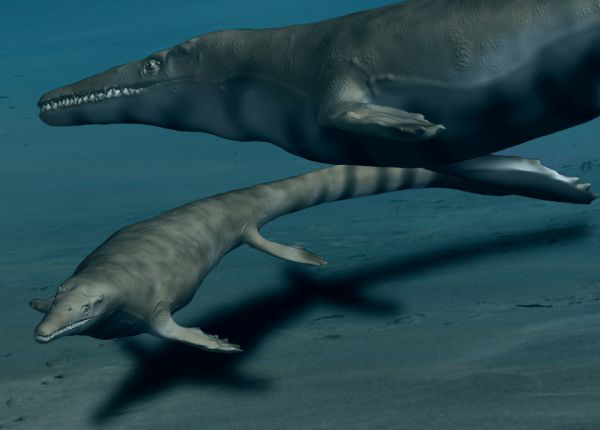
- Life restoration of two of the Late Cretaceous Mosasaurus
  †Mosasaurus
  - †Mosasaurus missouriensis – type locality for species
- †Myledaphus
  - †Myledaphus bipartitus

== N ==
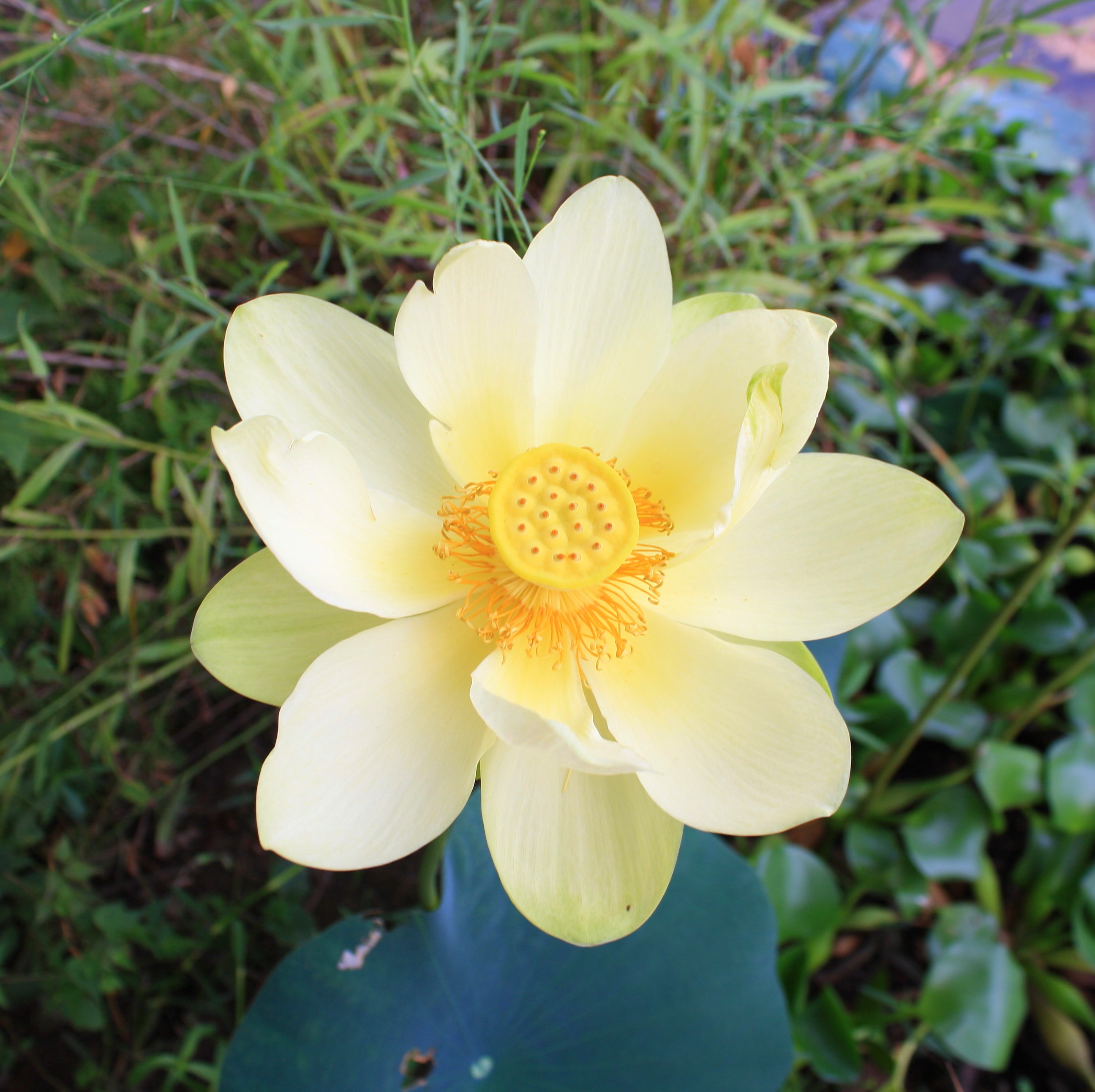
- A living Nelumbo lotus
  †Nelumbo
  - †Nelumbo FU62 – informal
- †Neocardioceras
  - †Neocardioceras transiens – type locality for species
- †Nonactaeonina
- †Nortedelphys
  - †Nortedelphys jasoni
- Nucula
  - †Nucula cancellata
  - †Nucula percrassa
  - †Nucula planomarginata
- Nuculana
  - †Nuculana grandensis
  - †Nuculana scitula
- †Nymphalucina
  - †Nymphalucina occidentalis

== O ==
- †Opertochasma
  - †Opertochasma cuneatum
- †Ophiomorpha
  - †Ophiomorpha nodosa
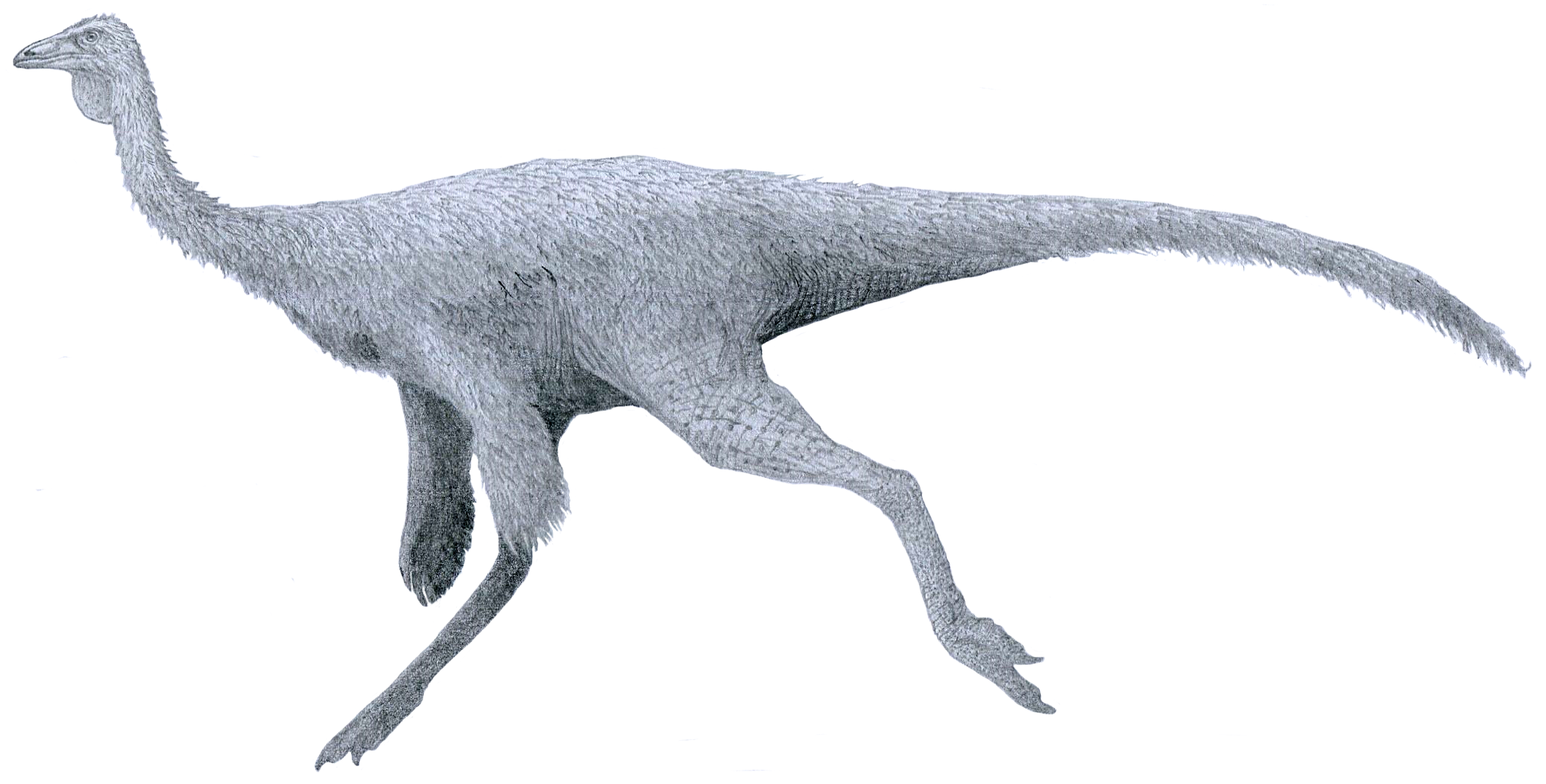
- Life restoration of the Late Cretaceous ostrich dinosaur Ornithomimus
  †Ornithomimus
- †Osmakasaurus
  - †Osmakasaurus depressus – type locality for species
- Ostrea
  - †Ostrea translucida
- †Otoscaphites
  - †Otoscaphites seabeensis
- †Oxytoma
  - †Oxytoma nebrascana

== P ==
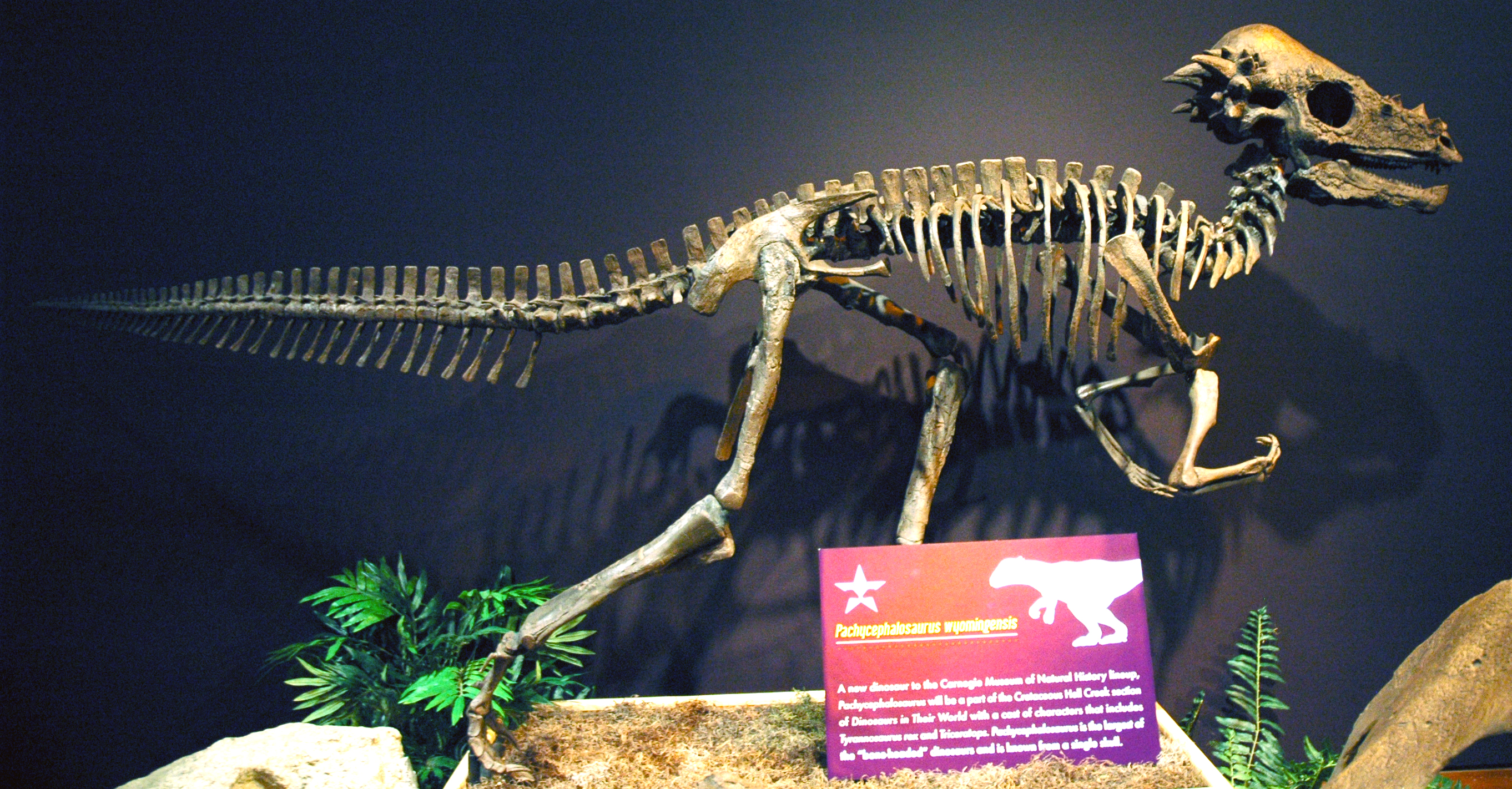
- Fossilized skeleton of the Late Cretaceous dome-headed dinosaur Pachycephalosaurus
  †Pachycephalosaurus – type locality for genus
  - †Pachycephalosaurus wyomingensis – type locality for species
- †Pachyrhizodus
- †Pahasapasaurus – type locality for genus
  - †Pahasapasaurus haasi – type locality for species
- †Paleoaster
  - †Paleoaster inquirenda
- †Palmoxylon
  - †Palmoxylon cheyennense
- Panopea
  - †Panopea occidentalis
- †Paronychodon
  - †Paronychodon lacustris
- †Passumys – type locality for genus
  - †Passumys angelli – type locality for species
- †Pediomys
  - †Pediomys elegans
- Periploma
  - †Periploma subgracile
- †Phelopteria
  - †Phelopteria linguaeformis
  - †Phelopteria minuta
  - †Phelopteria quadrate
- Pholadomya
  - †Pholadomya deweyensis
- †Pistia – report made of unidentified related form or using admittedly obsolete nomenclature
  - †Pistia corrugata
- †Placenticeras
  - †Placenticeras pseudoplacenta
- †Platanites
  - †Platanites marginata
- Platanus
  - †Platanus cissoides
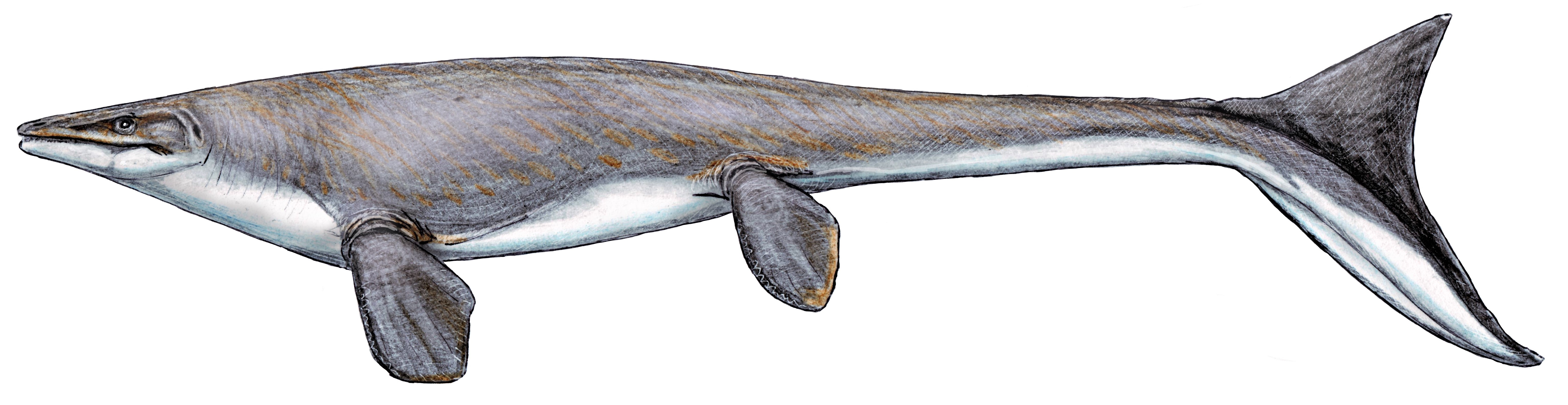
- Life restoration of the Late Cretaceous mosasaur Platecarpus
  †Platecarpus
  - †Platecarpus somenensis – or unidentified comparable form
  - †Platecarpus tympaniticus
- †Plesiobaena
  - †Plesiobaena antiqua
- †Plioplatecarpus
  - †Plioplatecarpus primaevus – type locality for species
- †Podozamites
  - †Podozamites lanceolatus
- †Prionocyclus
  - †Prionocyclus macombi
  - †Prionocyclus novimexicanus
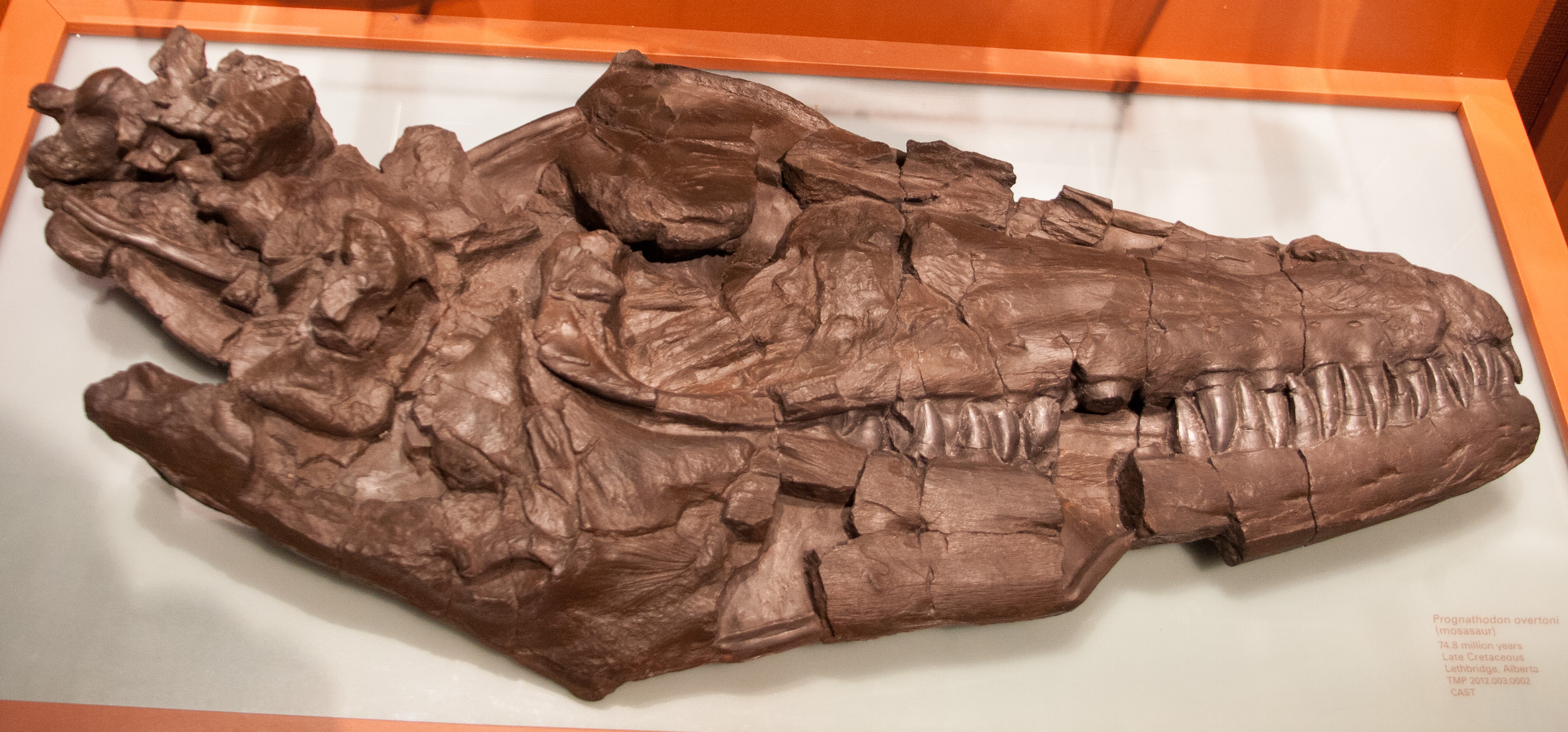
- Fossilized skull of the Late Cretaceous mosasaur Prognathodon
  †Prognathodon
  - †Prognathodon overtoni – type locality for species
- †Proplacenticeras
  - †Proplacenticeras stantoni
- †Protacanthoceras
  - †Protacanthoceras proteus
- †Protalphadon
  - †Protalphadon lulli – tentative report
- †Protocardia
  - †Protocardia subquadrata
- †Protolambda
  - †Protolambda florencae
  - †Protolambda hatcheri
- †Protosphyraena
- †Protostega
  - †Protostega marshii – type locality for species
- †Pseudoptera
  - †Pseudoptera subtortuosa
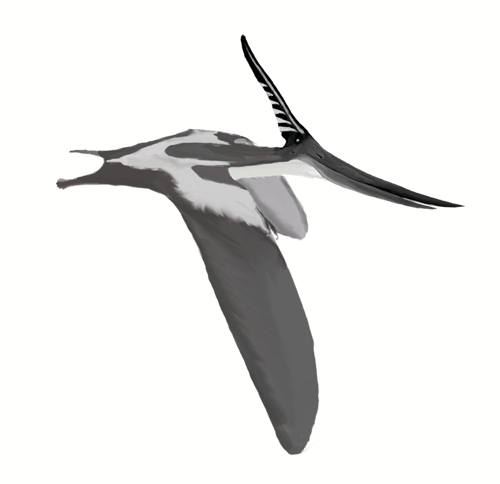
- Life restoration of the Late Cretaceous pterosaur Pteranodon
  †Pteranodon
  - †Pteranodon longiceps
- †Ptychodus
  - †Ptychodus janewayii
  - †Ptychodus occidentalis

== Q ==
- Quercus
  - †Quercus Wardiana
- †Quereuxia
  - †Quereuxia angulata

== R ==
- †Rhamnus
  - †Rhamnus cleburni
- †Rhombopsis
  - †Rhombopsis subturritus
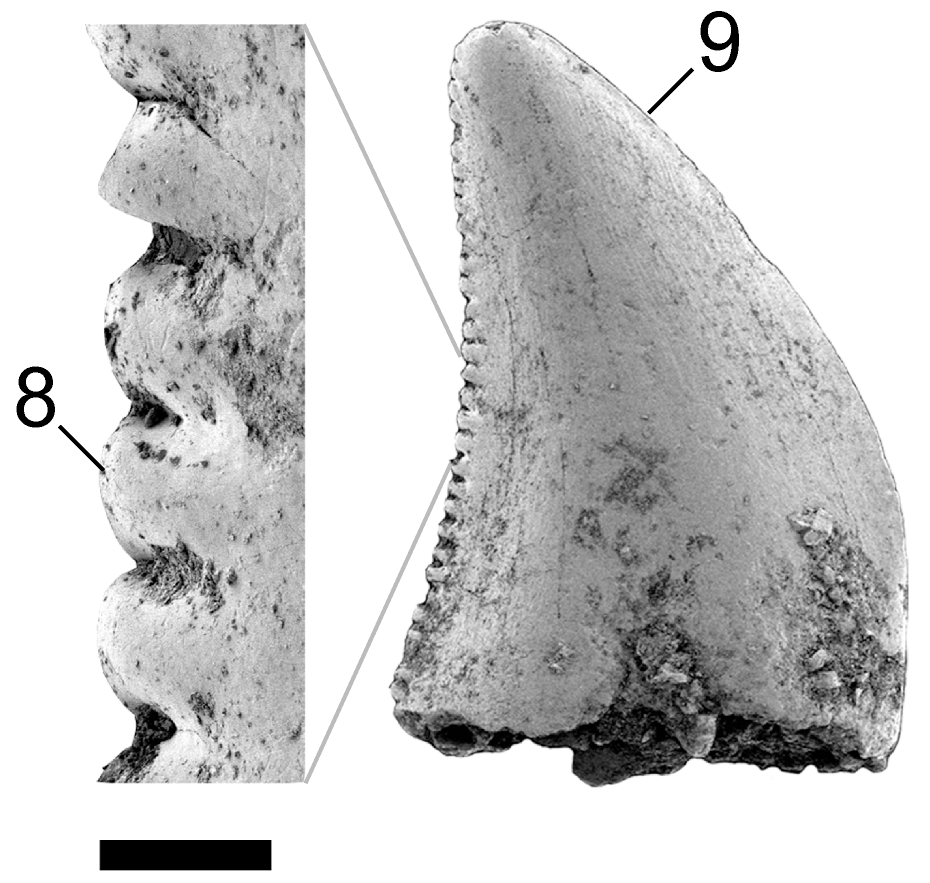
- Micrograph with magnified inset of a fossilized tooth of the Late Cretaceous theropod dinosaur Richardoestesia
  †Richardoestesia
  - †Richardoestesia isosceles

== S ==
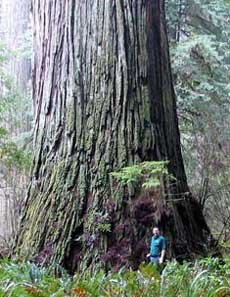
Base of the trunk of a living Sequoia tree with a human to scale

- Sassafras
  - †Sassafras Mudgii
- †Scaphites
  - †Scaphites delicatulus
- †Semitriton
  - †Semitriton buccinoides
- †Sequoia
  - †Sequoia HC70 – informal
- †Serrifusus
  - †Serrifusus dakotaensis
- Solemya
  - †Solemya subplicata
- †Sourimis
  - †Sourimis equilateralis
- Spaniorinus
  - †Spaniorinus nicolleti
- Sphaerium
- †Sphenobaiera
  - †Sphenobaiera ikorfatensis
- †Sphenodiscus
  - †Sphenodiscus beecheri – tentative report
  - †Sphenodiscus lobatus
  - †Sphenodiscus pleurisepta
- †Spyridoceramus
  - †Spyridoceramus tegulatus
- Squalicorax
  - †Squalicorax falcatus
- Squalus
- †Stramentum
  - †Stramentum haworthi
- Animated life restoration of the Late Cretaceous plesiosaur Styxosaurus
  †Styxosaurus
  - †Styxosaurus browni
  - †Styxosaurus snowii – type locality for species
- †Syncyclonema
  - †Syncyclonema halli

== T ==
- †Tancredia
  - †Tancredia americana
- †Tarrantoceras
  - †Tarrantoceras flexicostatum – or unidentified comparable form
- †Tatankaceratops – type locality for genus
  - †Tatankaceratops sacrisonorum – type locality for species
- †Taxodiaceaepollenites
- Taxodium
  - †Taxodium olrikii
- †Tellinimera
  - †Tellinimera scitula
- †Tenuipteria
  - †Tenuipteria fibrosa
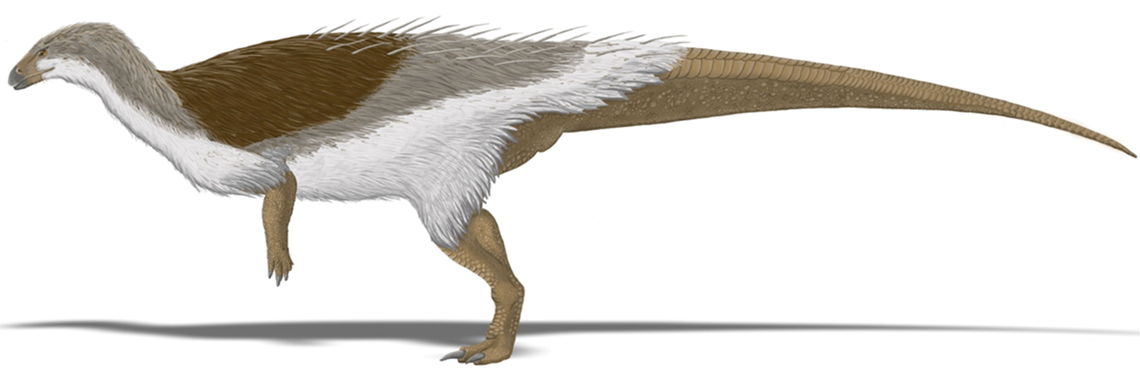
- Life restoration of the Late Cretaceous herbivorous dinosaur Thescelosaurus
  †Thescelosaurus
  - †Thescelosaurus neglectus
- †Thespesius – type locality for genus
  - †Thespesius occidentalis – type locality for species
- †Torosaurus
  - †Torosaurus latus
- †Toxochelys
  - †Toxochelys latiremis
- †Trachodon
- †Trachybaculites
  - †Trachybaculites columna
- †Tragodesmoceras
  - †Tragodesmoceras carlilense
  - †Tragodesmoceras carlilensis
- †Triceratops
  - †Triceratops horridus
- †Trochodendroides
  - †Trochodendroides nebrascensis
- †Tylosaurus
  - †Tylosaurus proriger
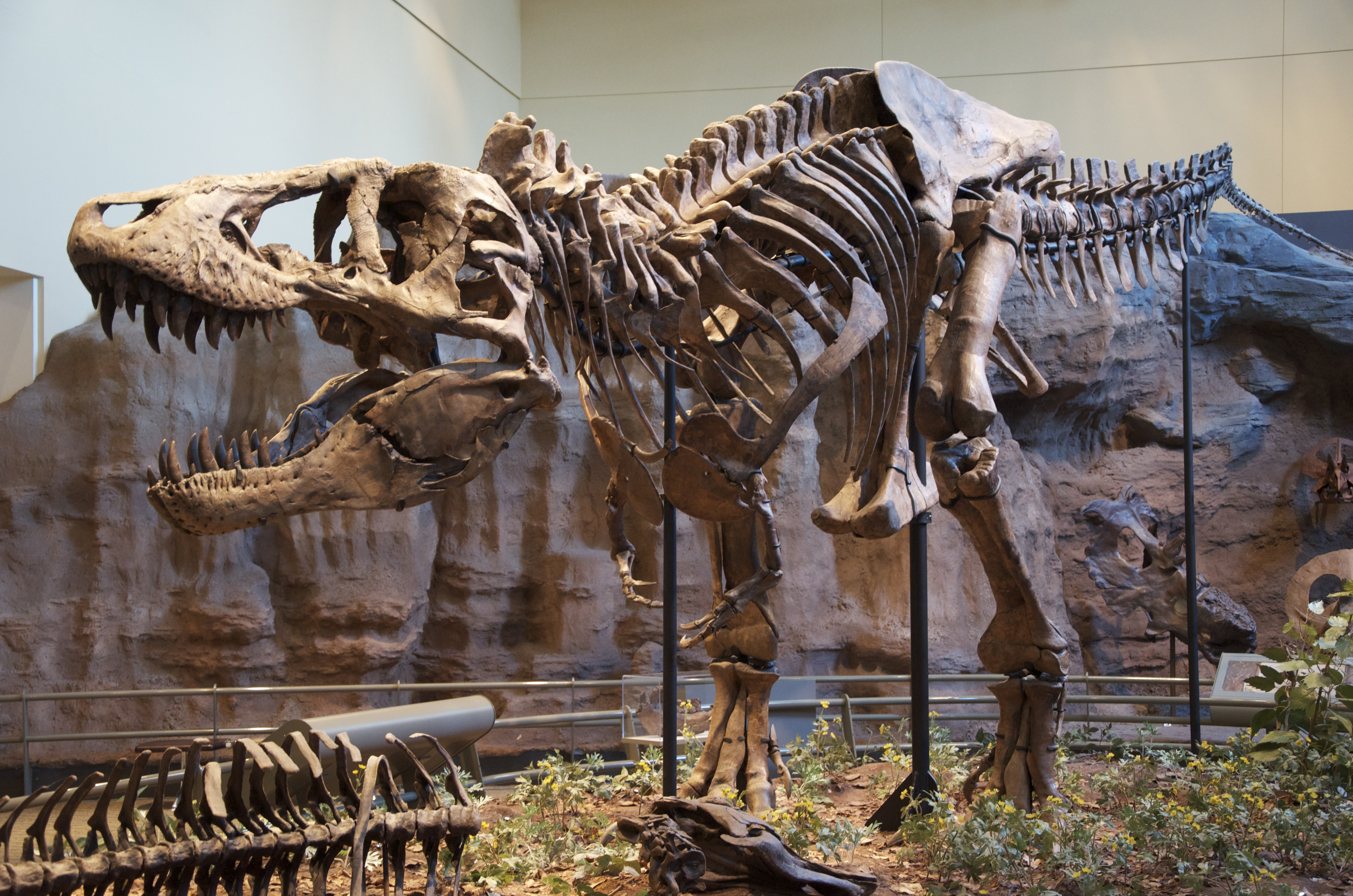
- Fossilized skeleton of the Late Cretaceous tyrannosaur Tyrannosaurus
  †Tyrannosaurus
  - †Tyrannosaurus rex

== V ==
- †Vanikoropsis
  - †Vanikoropsis nebrascensis
- †Viburnites
  - †Viburnites Evansanus
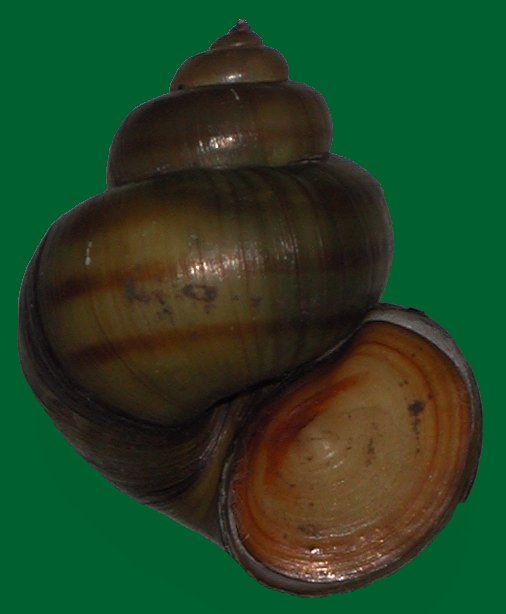
- Shell of a Viviparus freshwater snail
  Viviparus

== W ==
- †Willimactra

== Y ==
- †Yezoites
- Yoldia
  - †Yoldia lacrima
  - †Yoldia rectangularis

== Z ==
- Ziziphus
  - †Ziziphus fibrillosus
