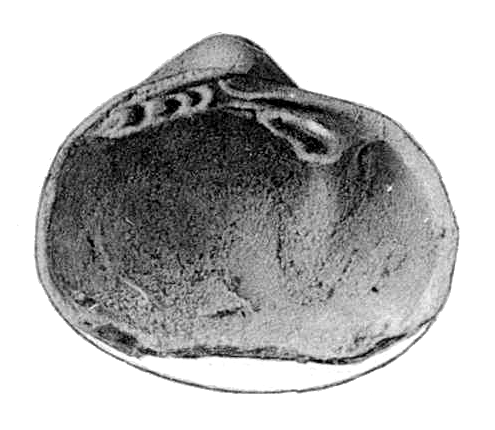
- Manzanella elliptica

Scientific classification
- Kingdom: Animalia
- Phylum: Mollusca
- Class: Bivalvia
- Order: Solemyida
- Superfamily: Manzanelloidea
- Family: Manzanellidae; Chronic, 1952

= Manzanellidae =

Extinct family of bivalves

Manzanellidae is a fossil family of bivalves, in the order Solemyida. They were previously considered containing fossil and recent members of Nucinellidae.

== Genera and species ==
- Manzanella Girty, 1909
  - Manzanella elliptica Girty, 1909
  - Manzanella cryptodentata Chronic, 1952
- Posterodonta Kauffman, 1976
  - Posterodonta manihikiensis Kauffman, 1976
