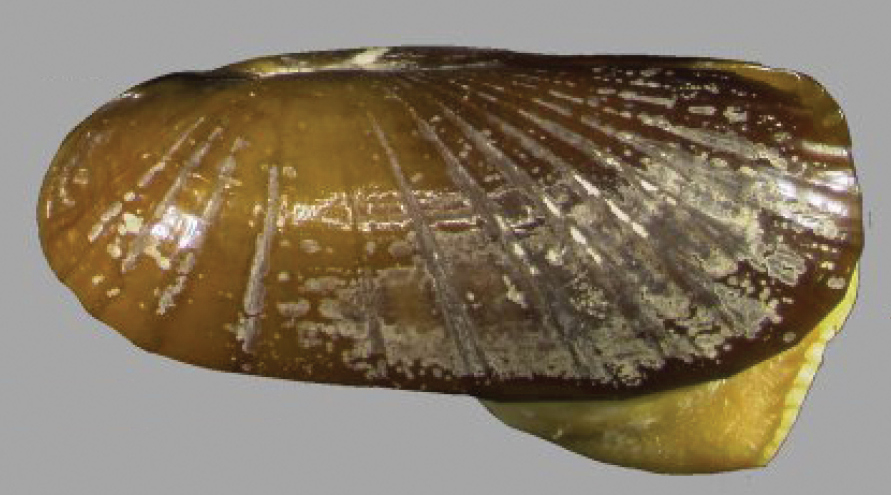
- Solemya elarraichensis holotype

Scientific classification
- Domain: Eukaryota
- Kingdom: Animalia
- Phylum: Mollusca
- Class: Bivalvia
- Order: Solemyida
- Superfamily: Solemyoidea; Gray, 1840

Families
- †Clinopisthidae Pojeta, 1988; †Ctenodontidae Wöhrmann, 1893; †Ovatoconchidae J. G. Carter, 2011; Solemyidae Gray, 1840

Synonyms
- Cryptodonta

= Solemyoidea =

Subclass of bivalves

Solemyoidea, formerly Cryptodonta, are a nearly-extinct superfamily of the bivalves.

The valves of the shell are relatively thin and somewhat elongated. Unlike most other bivalves, species in this group have no hinge teeth on their shells. They have relatively primitive, "protobranchiate", gills.
