= Huxleyia habooba =

Scientific classification
- Kingdom: Animalia
- Phylum: Mollusca
- Class: Bivalvia
- Order: Solemyida
- Family: Nucinellidae
- Genus: Huxleyia
- Species: H. habooba

Binomial name
- Huxleyia habooba Oliver & Taylor, 2011

Species of bivalve

Huxleyia habooba is a species of small, monomyarian, nuculoid bivalve. It was first found at a depth of 84 metres (276 ft) in the Arabian Sea. It is suspected of benefiting from chemosymbiosis with sulfur-oxidizing bacteria.
