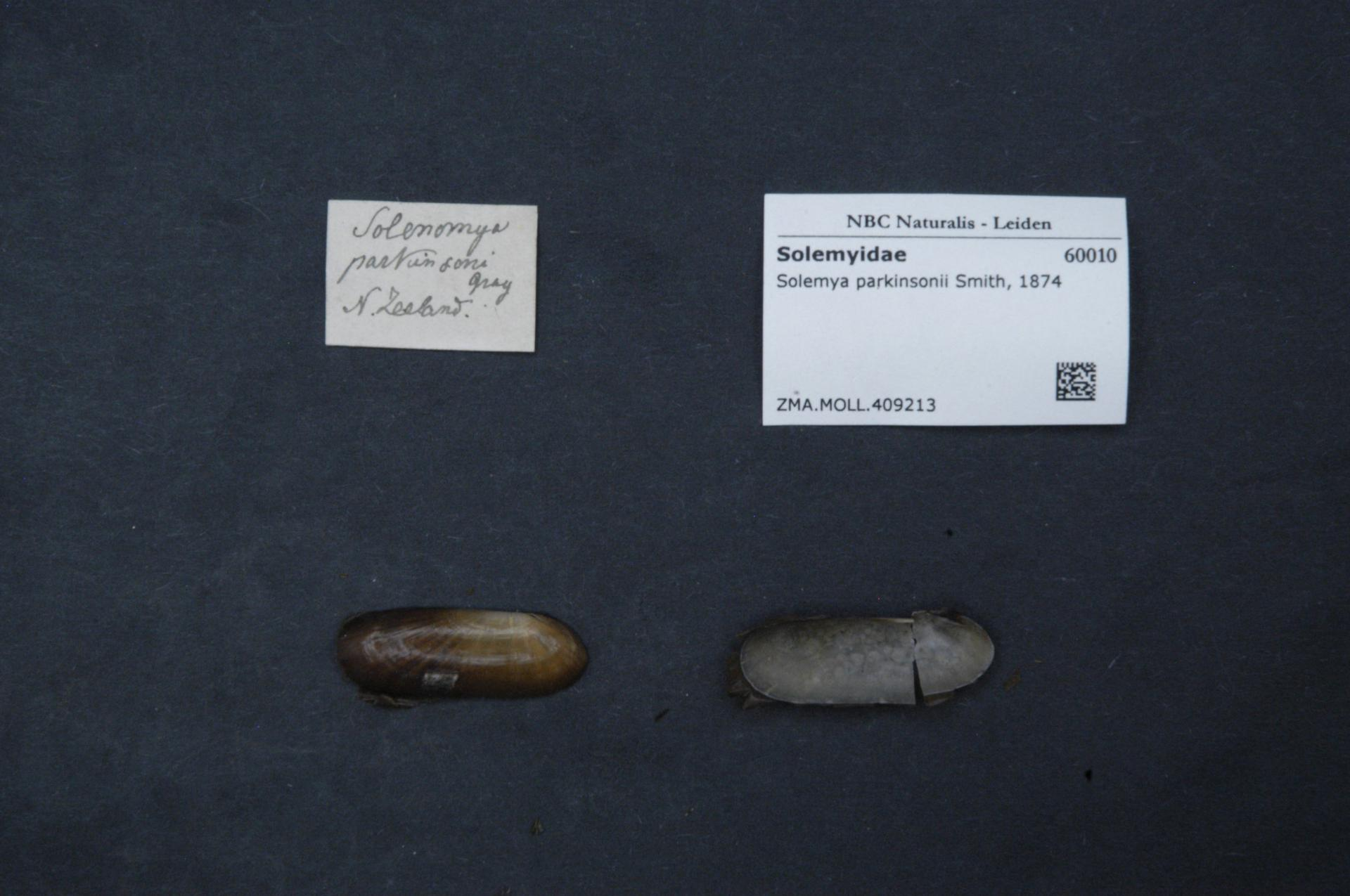
- Solemya parkinsonii Smith, 1874

Scientific classification
- Kingdom: Animalia
- Phylum: Mollusca
- Class: Bivalvia
- Order: Solemyida
- Family: Solemyidae
- Genus: Solemya
- Species: S. parkinsonii

Binomial name
- Solemya parkinsonii E. A. Smith, 1874

= Solemya parkinsonii =

Species of bivalve

Solemya parkinsonii is a species of saltwater clam, a marine bivalve mollusc in the family Solemyidae, the awning clams.
