= Nucinella owenensis =

Scientific classification
- Kingdom: Animalia
- Phylum: Mollusca
- Class: Bivalvia
- Order: Solemyida
- Family: Nucinellidae
- Genus: Nucinella
- Species: N. owenensis

Binomial name
- Nucinella owenensis Oliver & Taylor, 2011

Species of bivalve

Nucinella owenensis is a species of small, monomyarian, nuculoid bivalve.

It was first found at a depth of 3,400 metres (11,200 ft) in the Arabian Sea. It is suspected of benefiting from chemosymbiosis with sulphur-oxidizing bacteria.
