= Huxleyia =

Scientific classification
- Domain: Eukaryota
- Kingdom: Animalia
- Phylum: Mollusca
- Class: Bivalvia
- Order: Solemyida
- Family: Nucinellidae
- Genus: Huxleyia; Adams, 1860

Genus of bivalves

Huxleyia is a genus of bivalves belonging to the family Nucinellidae.

The genus has almost cosmopolitan distribution.

== Species ==
Species:

- Huxleyia cavernicola Hayami & Kase, 1993
- Huxleyia concentrica (Verco, 1907)
- Huxleyia diabolica (Jousseaume, 1897)
- Huxleyia habooba Oliver & Taylor, 2012
- Huxleyia maxima Thiele & Jaeckel, 1931
- Huxleyia munita (Dall, 1898)
- Huxleyia pentadonta Scarlato, 1981
- Huxleyia sulcata Adams, 1860
