= Solemya velum =

Scientific classification
- Kingdom: Animalia
- Phylum: Mollusca
- Class: Bivalvia
- Order: Solemyida
- Family: Solemyidae
- Genus: Solemya
- Species: S. velum

Binomial name
- Solemya velum Say, 1822

Species of bivalve

Solemya velum, the Atlantic awning clam, is a species of marine bivalve mollusc in the family Solemyidae, the awning clams. This species is found along the eastern coast of North America, from Nova Scotia to Florida and inhabits subtidal sediments with high organic matter (OM) content and low Oxygen, such as salt ponds, salt marshes, and sewage outfalls.

Species within the Solemya genus are distinguished by their reduced or absent guts and their association with symbiotic, chemosynthetic bacteria, which produce metabolic energy by oxidizing sulfide in order to fix carbon for their hosts. Other Solemya species have been discovered near hydrothermal vents and cold-seeps; environments where chemosynthesis and bacterial symbiosis are common.

== Identification ==
S. velum is characterized by having an elongated oval shell with parallel ventral and dorsal margins. Individuals range from 8 to 10 cm in length and the shells are lightly calcified, making them distinctively thin and brittle. The periostracum is a smooth, dark brown layer that extends past the shell edge. Unlike most bivalves, the interior of the hinge has no teeth. Sulfur-oxidizing bacterial symbionts are intracellular, harbored in the epithelial cells of S. velum gills and the tissue appears yellow when freshly collected due to the build-up of these sulfuric compounds.

Solemya belongs to a group of "primitive" bivalves called protobranchs, which may be an ancestral or early diverging group. Most protobranchs live with the anterior end down in sediment so that the gills on the posterior end orient upwards. Opposite of other clams, water is circulated from the anterior end toward the posterior end and across the gills. The protobranchs usually have long extensions of the mouth called labial palps, which they extend into the sediment and pick up particles for feeding, though Solemya species lack labial palps because of their reliance on symbiotic bacteria. Some protobranchs, including Solemya, also have a small flattened "sole" on their foot, which aids the clam in burrowing. The sole has left and right halves which can be folded together to collapse the foot into a narrow profile. The foot is then inserted into the sediment, the sole is unfolded to its wide configuration, and the foot is retracted to draw the clam down into the sediment. Because of their signature foot structure, Solemya creates distinctive U-shaped burrows and can completely bury itself with two thrusts of the foot in this manner. S. velum individuals have been found as deep as 100 m.

== Ecology ==
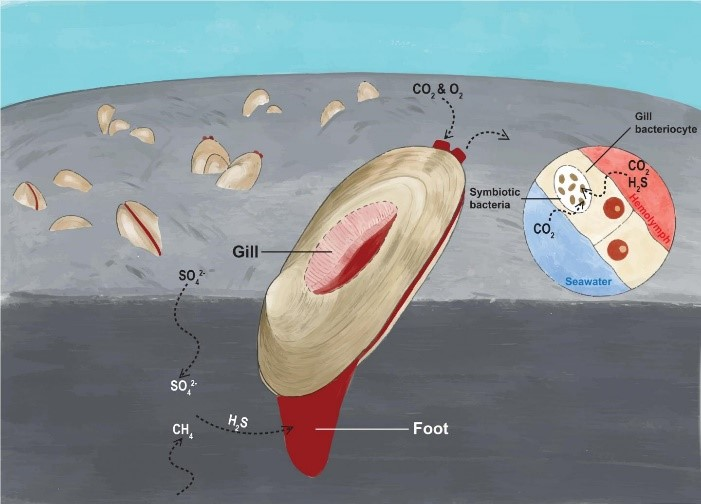
Uptake of sulfur compounds by Solemya clams and sulfur metabolism by intracellular symbiotic bacteria inside gills.

Most bivalve species are filter feeders, though with their reduced guts and reliance on symbiotic bacteria, Solemya species either seldom filter-feed or abandoned filter-feeding altogether. Whether or not S. velum engages in filter feeding as a secondary food source is still an active area of research.

The bacterial symbionts within S. velum and other Solemya species are chemoautotrophic, able to fix Carbon by using chemical energy from sulfur oxidation reactions and taking up CO_{2}. The presence of these clams and their symbionts in areas with high woody debris or sewage is critical in cycling carbon and breaking down sulfur compounds, reducing the toxicity of near-anoxic sediments.

== Scientific interest ==
S. velum is considered to be a model organism for studying bacterial symbiosis in bivalves. More accessible than its deep-sea relatives, S. velum can be collected from intertidal sediments and is easy to maintain in laboratory experiments. The genome of S. velum was sequenced in 2006 and is valuable for studying the relationships between animal and bacteria cells. The carbon-fixation capabilities of S. velum symbionts are an active area of research for the importance of CO_{2} consumption in marine carbon cycling.
