= Solemya borealis =

Conservation status
- Vulnerable (NatureServe)

Scientific classification
- Kingdom: Animalia
- Phylum: Mollusca
- Class: Bivalvia
- Order: Solemyida
- Family: Solemyidae
- Genus: Solemya
- Species: S. borealis

Binomial name
- Solemya borealis Lamarck, 1818

Species of bivalve

Solemya borealis, the boreal awning clam, is a species of saltwater clam, a marine bivalve mollusc in the family Solemyidae the awning clams. This species is found along the northeastern coast of North America, from Nova Scotia to Connecticut.

S. borealis belong to the Petrasma subgenus; being characterized by having an elongated oval shell with parallel ventral and dorsal margins. Individuals may reach a length of 8 to 10 cm and have a periostracum of dark brown color.

Nutritionally, S. borealis contains concentrations of chemoautotrophic bacteria in inner gill filaments, symbiotically attached to the host.
