= Solemya occidentalis =

Scientific classification
- Kingdom: Animalia
- Phylum: Mollusca
- Class: Bivalvia
- Order: Solemyida
- Family: Solemyidae
- Genus: Solemya
- Species: S. occidentalis

Binomial name
- Solemya occidentalis (Deshayes, 1857)

Species of bivalve

Solemya occidentalis , the West Indian awning clam, is a species of marine bivalve mollusc in the family Solemyidae. This species is found in the western Atlantic Ocean from Florida to the West Indies.
