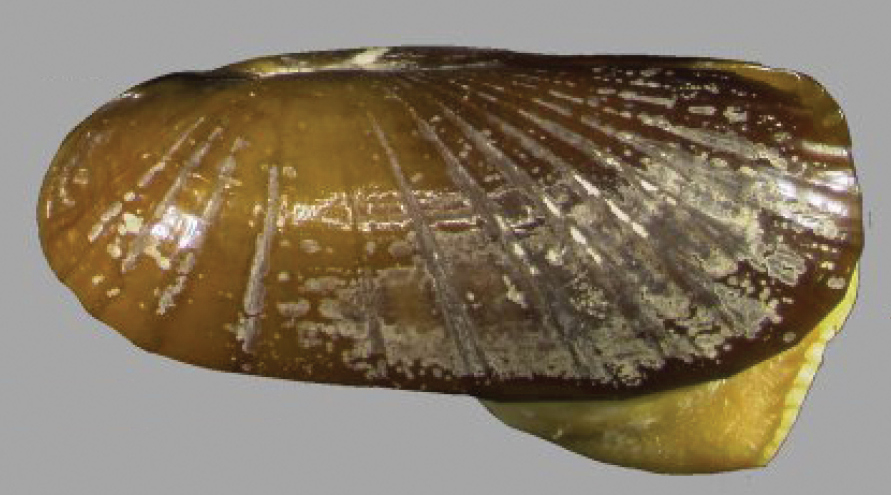
- The holotype of Solemya elarraichensis

Scientific classification
- Kingdom: Animalia
- Phylum: Mollusca
- Class: Bivalvia
- Order: Solemyida
- Family: Solemyidae
- Genus: Solemya; Lamarck, 1818

= Solemya =

Genus of bivalves

Solemya is a genus of saltwater clams, marine bivalve mollusks in the family Solemyidae, the awning clams. Solemya is the type genus of the family Solemyidae.

== Description ==
The shell valves of species in this genus are fragile and subcylindrical in shape; there are no hinge teeth. The shell has a persistent thin periostracum which extends beyond the valve margins, hence the common name "awning clams".

These clams have chemosynthetic bacterial symbionts that produce their food. The bacteria live within their gill cells, and produce energy by oxidizing hydrogen sulfide, which they then use to fix carbon dioxide via the Calvin cycle. This symbiosis has been best-studied in the Atlantic species S. velum and the Pacific species S. reidi.

== Species ==
Species within the genus Solemya include:

- Solemya africana
- Solemya atacama
- Solemya australis
- Solemya borealis
- Solemya elarraichensis
- Solemya flava
- Solemya moretonensis
- Solemya notialis
- Solemya occidentalis
- Solemya panamensis
- Solemya parkinsonii
- Solemya pervernicosa
- Solemya pusilla
- Solemya reidi
- Solemya tagiri
- Solemya terraereginae
- Solemya velesiana
- Solemya velum
- Solemya winkworthi
