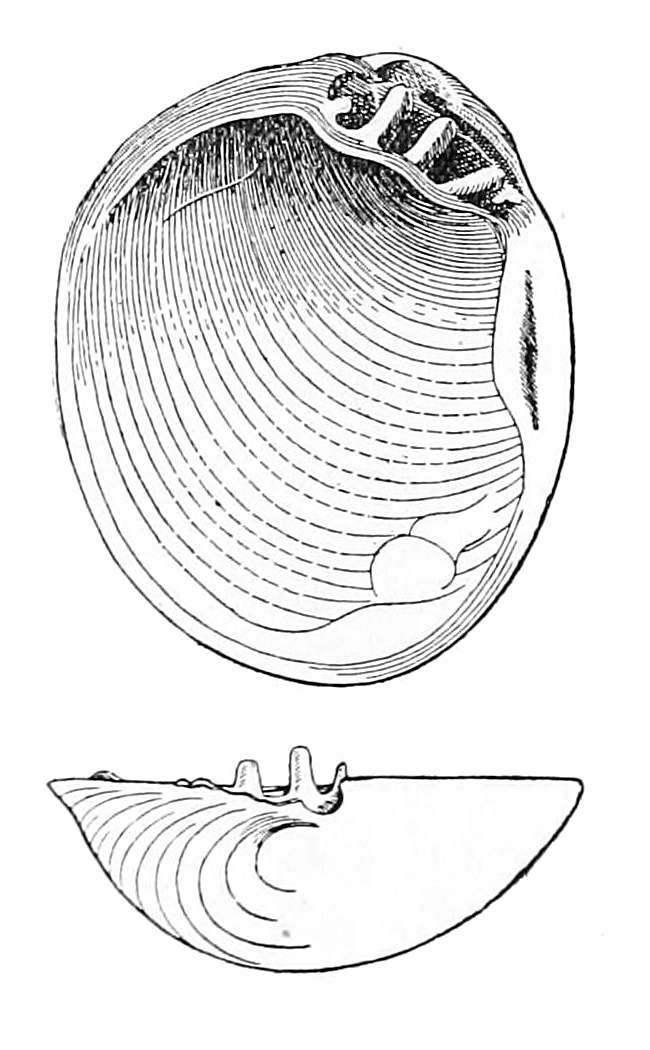
- Nucinella dalli

Scientific classification
- Kingdom: Animalia
- Phylum: Mollusca
- Class: Bivalvia
- Order: Solemyida
- Superfamily: Manzanelloidea
- Family: Nucinellidae; HE Vokes, 1956

= Nucinellidae =

Family of bivalves

Nucinellidae is a family of bivalves, in the order Solemyida. Its species are small and principally reside in deep-water environments. The species' average length is less than 5 millimetres (0.20 in), the largest species being Nucinella boucheti (La Perna, 2005) at a length of 25 millimetres (0.98 in). The family's characteristic features include large gills and reduced palps and their appendages; oval shells with few hinge teeth; they possess a single adductor muscle and one divided foot exhibiting papillae. The family contains two known genera: Huxleyia and Nucinella. Speaking of Nucinella, the genus' ligament system is of the simple arched type, lacking nymphae. Regarding the former, the system is "submerged" beneath its dorsal margin.

== Genera and species ==
- Huxleyia (Adams, 1860)
  - Huxleyia cavernicola (Hayami & Kase, 1993)
  - Huxleyia concentrica (Verco, 1907)
  - Huxleyia diabolica (Jousseaume, 1897)
  - Huxleyia habooba (Oliver & Taylor, 2012)
  - Huxleyia munita (Dall, 1898)
  - Huxleyia pentadonta (Scarlato, 1981)
  - Huxleyia sulcata (Adams, 1860)
- Nucinella (Wood, 1851)
  - Nucinella adamsii (Dall, 1898)
  - Nucinella boucheti (La Perna, 2005)
  - Nucinella dalli (Hedley, 1902)
  - Nucinella giribeti (Glover & Taylor, 2013)
  - Nucinella kanekoi (Matsukuma, Okutani & Tsuchi, 1982)
  - Nucinella maoriana (Hedley, 1904)
  - Nucinella maxima (Thiele, 1931)
  - Nucinella ovalis (Wood, 1840)
  - Nucinella owenensis (Oliver & Taylor, 2012)
  - Nucinella pretiosa (Gould, 1861)
  - Nucinella serrei (Lamy, 1912)
  - Nucinella subdola (Strong & Hertlein, 1937)
  - Nucinella surugana (Matsukuma, Okutani & Tsuchi, 1982)
  - Nucinella viridis (Matsukuma, Okutani & Tsuchi, 1982)
  - Nucinella viridula (Kuznetzov & Schileyko, 1984)
