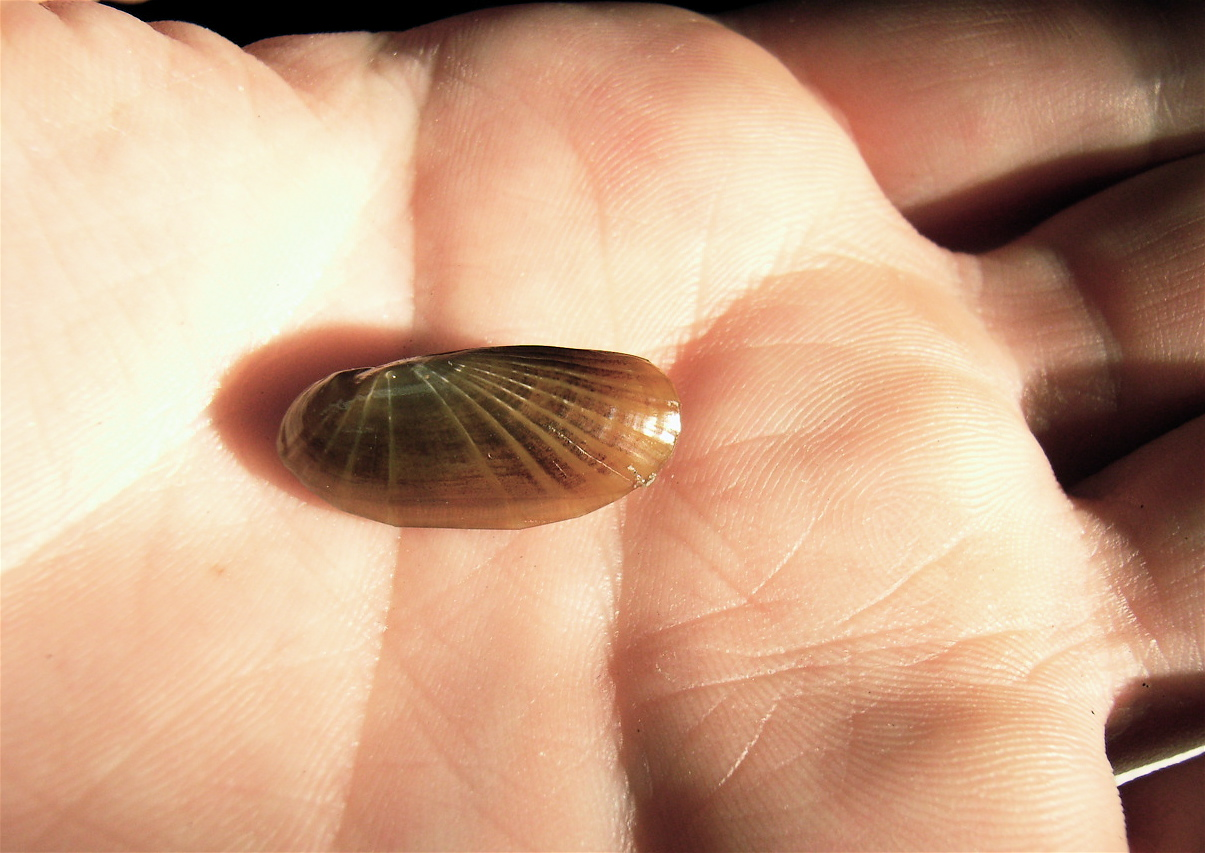

Scientific classification
- Kingdom: Animalia
- Phylum: Mollusca
- Class: Bivalvia
- Order: Solemyida
- Superfamily: Solemyoidea
- Family: Solemyidae; J. E. Gray, 1840

Genera
- See text

= Solemyidae =

Family of bivalves

Solemyidae is a family of saltwater clams, marine protobranch bivalve mollusks in the order Solemyida.

== Biology ==
Solemyids are remarkable in that their digestive tract is either extremely small or non-existent, and their feeding appendages are too short to reach outside the shell.

It has been shown that these clams host sulphur-oxidizing bacteria intracellularly within their gill filaments. As chemoautotrophs, these bacterial symbionts synthesize organic matter from CO_{2} and are the primary source of nutrition for the whole organism. In turn, the animal host provides its symbionts a habitat in which they have access to the substrates of chemoautotrophy (O_{2}, CO_{2}, and reduced inorganic compounds such as H_{2}S). Together, these partners create "animals" with novel metabolic capabilities.

== Genera and species ==
The family Solemyidae includes two genera and the following species:

- Acharax Dall, 1908
  - Acharax alinae Métivier & Cosel, 1993
  - Acharax bartschii (Dall, 1908)
  - Acharax caribbaea (Vokes, 1970)
  - Acharax clarificata Dell, 1995
  - Acharax gadirae Oliver, Rodrigues & Cunha, 2011
  - Acharax grandis (Verrill & Bush, 1898)
  - Acharax japonica (Dunker, 1882)
  - Acharax johnsoni (Dall, 1891)
  - Acharax patagonica (E. A. Smith, 1885)
  - Acharax prashadi (Vokes, 1955)
- Solemya Lamarck, 1818
  - Solemya africana Martens, 1880
  - Solemya atacama (Kuznetzov & Schileyko, 1984)
  - Solemya australis Lamarck, 1818
  - Solemya borealis Totten, 1834
  - Solemya elarraichensis Oliver, Rodrigues & Cunha, 2011
  - Solemya flava Sato, Sasaki & Watanabe, 2013
  - Solemya moretonensis Taylor, Glover & Williams, 2008
  - Solemya notialis Simone, 2009
  - Solemya occidentalis Deshayes, 1857
  - Solemya panamensis Dall, 1908
  - Solemya parkinsonii E. A. Smith, 1874
  - Solemya pervernicosa (Kuroda, 1948)
  - Solemya pusilla Gould, 1861
  - Solemya tagiri Okutani, Hashimoto & Miura, 2004
  - Solemya terraereginae Iredale, 1929
  - Solemya togata (Poli, 1791)
  - Solemya valvulus Carpenter, 1864
  - Solemya velesiana Iredale, 1931
  - Solemya velum Say, 1822
  - Solemya winckworthi Prashad, 1932
