= Halka Chronic =

American geologist (1923–2013)

- Born: February 26, 1923
- Died: April 16, 2013 (aged 90)
- Education: B.A. Zoology, M.A. Biology, Ph.D. Geology
- Occupation: Geologist
- Notable work: Roadside Geology Book Series

Halka Chronic (February 26, 1923 – April 16, 2013) was a geologist who traveled and wrote books about the geology of the western United States. She studied the Grand Canyon, Walnut Canyon and then resided in Boulder, Colorado where she continued to study the Rocky Mountains.

== Early life ==
Halka Chronic was born in Tucson, Arizona on February 26, 1923. She was born to Sidney F. and Marylka Modjeska Pattison as Helena Bainbridge Pattison. Halka spent her childhood summers in Corona Del Mar, California with her mother, an artist, and her brother, Karl. In her early life she took trips across the country to Cape Cod, Massachusetts. She developed her passion for traveling and sailing, as well as her skill as a watercolor painter, during these travels with her family. Halka attended the University of Arizona and Stanford University, and she received her Ph.D. in geology from Columbia University in 1949. Halka chose to focus on the fossils of Walnut Canyon, Arizona while earning her Ph.D. Halka spent a summer working with geologist Edwin McKee in the Grand Canyon during the 1940s, work that built the foundation of her future in geology. Halka Married John Chronic in 1948, and moved to Boulder, CO soon after her graduation and their wedding. Halka and John raised four daughters.

== Travels ==
The couple was based in Boulder, Colorado, but Halka and her husband traveled frequently, spending a year at a time in Scotland, Ethiopia, Australia, and Puerto Rico. Although the couple eventually separated, Halka continued traveling on her own to Mexico, Norway, Poland, China, and Latin America. She also drove the Alaska Highway four times.

While in Ethiopia, Halka taught at Haile Selassie University.

While in Sydney, she began writing geology books. She also worked as a scientific editor for the Geological Society of America.

During a cross country trip, she wrote the Roadside Geology Books for Colorado, Utah, New Mexico, and Arizona.

== Career and awards ==
Halka began her career at the Museum of Northern Arizona in Flagstaff, Arizona. After this she taught at the University of Michigan- Summerfield Campus. Chronic had a B.A. in Zoology earned at the University of Arizona, an M.A. in Biology from Stanford University, and a Ph.D. in Geology achieved from Columbia University. Halka traveled to Ethiopia in the late 1940s and taught at Haile Selassie University; when she came back she worked at the National Center for Atmospheric Research (NCAR) as a writer for eight years. Later, she traveled across the West to Arizona, Colorado, New Mexico, and Utah, also known as the Four Corners region. As she was traveling, Halka was studying the geology of the western national parks, and she later wrote Three Pages of Stone. In addition to this Halka wrote two other books. Halka also worked as a consultant for groundwater and petroleum research. In 2004, Halka Chronic received the Geoscience in the Media Award given by the American Association of Petroleum Geologists.
