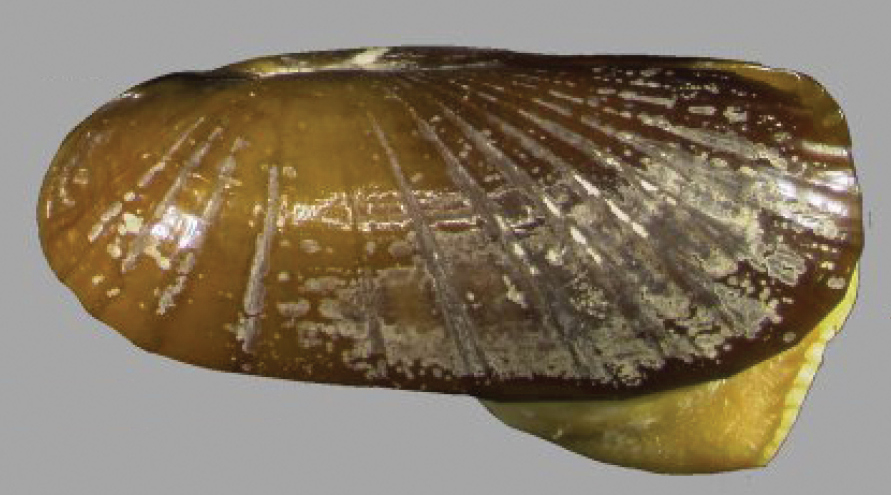
- Holotype of Solemya elarraichensis

Scientific classification
- Kingdom: Animalia
- Phylum: Mollusca
- Class: Bivalvia
- Order: Solemyida
- Family: Solemyidae
- Genus: Solemya
- Species: S. elarraichensis

Binomial name
- Solemya elarraichensis Oliver, Rodrigues & Cunha, 2011

= Solemya elarraichensis =

Species of bivalve

Solemya elarraichensis is a species of marine bivalve mollusc in the family Solemyidae. It is endemic to the deep-water mud volcano slopes in the Gulf of Cadiz in the eastern Atlantic Ocean.

== Description ==
Solemya elarraichensis reaches a maximum length of about 35 mm (1.4 in). The fragile valves are equal in size and subcylindrical, with the beaks nearer the posterior end. The beaks are indistinct and the umbos sunken, and there are no hinge teeth. The ligament connecting the valves is primarily internal. The exterior of the shell is sculpted by fine radial ridges, about five at the posterior end and eleven at the anterior end. The shell has a persistent thin periostracum which extends beyond the valve margins. It is yellowish-brown at first but darkens with age.

== Distribution and habitat ==
Solemya elarraichensis is endemic to the volcanic area in the Gulf of Cadiz, off the coast of Spain. The whole area is under compressive deformation and mud volcanism and the processes associated with the escape of hydrocarbon-rich fluids sustain a broad diversity of chemosynthetic organisms. The area includes over forty mud volcanoes, a type of cold seep, at depths between 200 and 4,000 m (656 and 13,123 ft), and active methane seepage occurs in several places.
