= Cycadeoidea =

Cycadeoidea Temporal range: Cretaceous
- Life reconstruction of Cycadeoidea

Scientific classification
- Kingdom: Plantae
- Clade: Tracheophytes
- Order: †Bennettitales
- Family: †Cycadeoidaceae
- Genus: †Cycadeoidea; Buckland, 1828

Type species
- †Cycadeoidea megalophylla Buckland

Species
- See text.

Synonyms
- Mantellia Pomel; Cylindropodium Saporta; Bennettites Carruth.; Clathropodium Saporta; Cycadea Capellini & Solms; Schizopodium Morière; Tysonia Fontaine

Extinct genus of seed plants

Cycadeoidea is an extinct genus of bennettitalean plants known from the Cretaceous (and possibly the Jurassic) of North America, Europe and Asia. They grew as cycad-like plants with a short trunk topped with a crown of leaves.

== Taxonomy ==
William Buckland originally gave the name to two species he described, C. megalophylla and C. microphylla, in 1828, seeing characteristics akin to living cycads. Robert Brown and Mr. Loddiges of Loddiges Nursery in Hackney had seen living cycads and urged him to name the fossils after them. The original type specimens of both taxa have not been located, so new type material has been chosen.

Classification of species within the genus is very difficult, as several trunks have been described as species, and a further fourteen species are known from detached leaf remains, but there is no way of telling which leaf remains go with which trunk remains (if any).

== Description ==
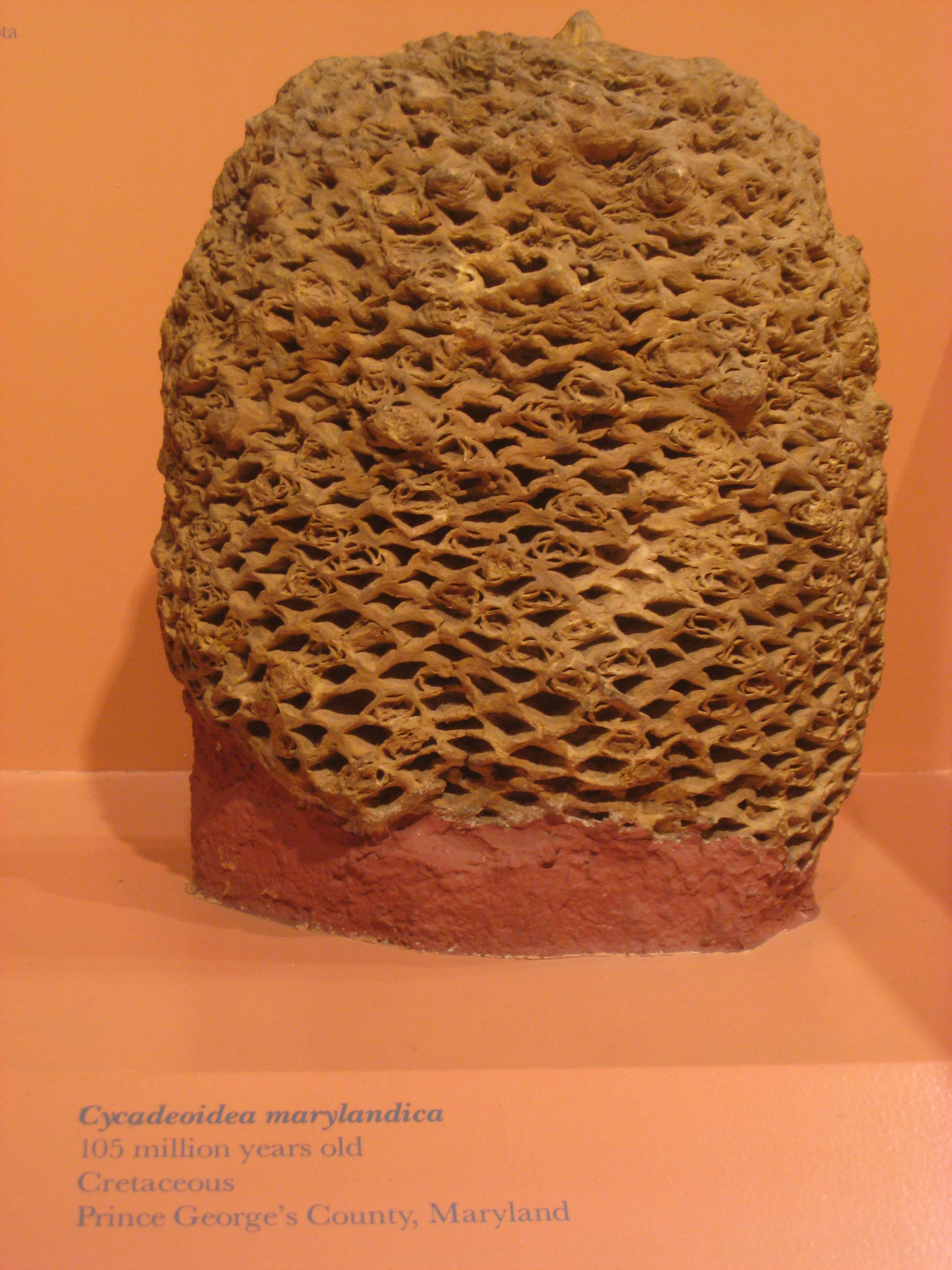
C. marylandica specimen on display at the National Museum of Natural History

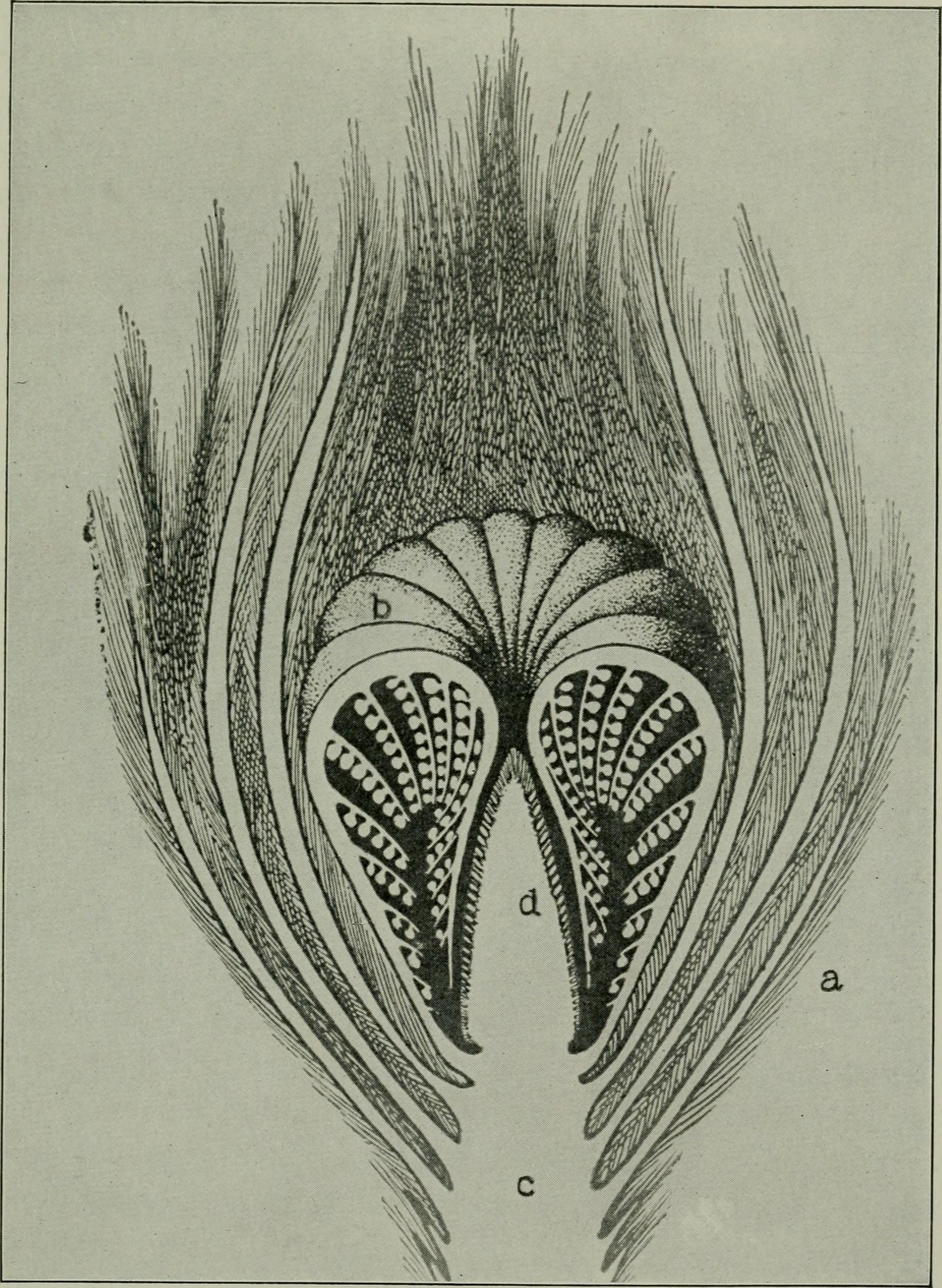
Diagram of the strobilus of Cycadeoidea dacotensis (1918)

Cycadeoidea stems were "short and barrel-shaped," with a "crown of pinnate leaves" atop the stem. The trunk was covered in imbricate leaf bases, similar to the trunks of cycads. The exact nature of the leaves that topped the stem is unclear, as the trunks are preserved without the adult leaves. The reproductive structures are bisexual (i.e. having a combined male and female organ), and are deeply sunken into the stem on the axils of the leaves, and they are surrounded by scales and embedded within the persistent leaf bases. The genus may have undergone self-pollination, although it is also possible that insects were involved in the process. The size and shape of the trunk has been used to distinguish species, however forms intermediate between two species suggest the two might be merely different-sized or aged plants can't be excluded.

== Fossil sites and species ==
The following species have been described:

- Cycadeoidea cylindrica (Brongn. ex Mantell)
- Cycadeoidea deshayesii (Saporta)
- Cycadeoidea duvalii (Pomel) Doweld
- Cycadeoidea gibsoniana (Carruthers) Seward
- Cycadeoidea maccafferyi
- Cycadeoidea megalophylla Buckland
- Cycadeoidea microphylla Buckland

The Isle of Portland was the site of the first specimens recovered, described by Buckland as C. megalophylla (the type species) and C. microphylla.

Cycadeoidea gibsoniana is a species collected from Lower Greensand from Luccombe Chine on the Isle of Wight, notable for the remarkable state of preservation of its plant parts. The original specimen was found by Thomas Field Gibson and was extensively broken and sliced to examine its anatomy.

Four well preserved cones of a species C. maccafferyi were uncovered in the Upper Cretaceous Haslam Formation on Vancouver and Hornby Island in British Columbia.

The distribution of the species is primarily Cretaceous in age, though some remains of the genus may date to the Jurassic.
