= Marylka H. Modjeska =

American artist

- Marylka H. Modjeska in Tucson, Arizona, c.1910-1930
- Born: 1893; Chicago, IL
- Died: 1966 (aged 72–73); Tucson, AZ

Marylka H. Modjeska (1893–1966) was an American actress and visual artist known for her etchings. Her work is included in the collections of the Smithsonian American Art Museum and the Art Institute of Chicago. She was also known as Marylka Stuart Helena Modjeska and Marylka Modjeska Pattison. She was primarily active in California.
