= Leptalestes =

Scientific classification
- Kingdom: Animalia
- Phylum: Chordata
- Class: Mammalia
- Family: †Pediomyidae
- Genus: †Leptalestes; Davis, 2007

Extinct genus of mammals in the infraclass Metatheria

Leptalestes is an extinct genus of mammals in the infraclass Metatheria. It was described by B.M. Davis in 2007. A new species, L. toevsi, was described from the late Cretaceous period of the United States by John P. Hunter, Ronald E. Heinrich, and David B. Weishampel in 2010.

== Species ==
- Leptalestes cooki (Clemens 1966)
- Leptalestes prokrejcii (Fox 1979)
- Leptalestes krejcii (Clemens 1966)
- Leptalestes toevsi Hunter et al. 2010
