= Tragodesmoceras =

Tragodesmoceras Temporal range: Late Cretaceous

Scientific classification
- Kingdom: Animalia
- Phylum: Mollusca
- Class: Cephalopoda
- Subclass: †Ammonoidea
- Order: †Ammonitida
- Family: †Muniericeratidae
- Genus: †Tragodesmoceras; Spath, 1922

Genus of ammonite

Tragodesmoceras is a large moderately involute ammonite with deeply embracing whorls that are higher than wide, a steep sided umbilicus and a narrowly rounded venter. Ornament consists of primary ribs that begin at the umbilical shoulder and smaller secondary ribs that begin mid flank. Ribs are sigmodal, periodically thickened and bent forward on the outer flank to cross the venter as chevrons. The suture has a broad trifid lateral lobe.

Species include Tregodesmoceras clypealoides (type), known from western Europe and the U.S., Tragodesmosderas bassi, known from Arizona and Kansas, and Tragodesoceras socorroense known from Arizona and New Mexico.

The related Muniericeras is more evolute in form, but otherwise similar.
