= Galagadon =

Galagadon Temporal range: Late Cretaceous, 67.4 Ma
- Fossil teeth at the Hong Kong Science Museum

Scientific classification
- Kingdom: Animalia
- Phylum: Chordata
- Class: Chondrichthyes
- Subclass: Elasmobranchii
- Division: Selachii
- Order: Orectolobiformes
- Genus: †Galagadon; Gates, Gorscak and Makovicky, 2019
- Species: †G. nordquistae

Binomial name
- †Galagadon nordquistae Gates, Gorscak and Makovicky, 2019

Genus of sharks known only from fossils

Galagadon (/ɡælʌɡədɒn/) is an extinct genus of small carpet shark that lived during the Late Cretaceous period. It contains one species, G. nordquistae. It was named after the video game Galaga due to a resemblance between its teeth and the spaceships in the game, and Field Museum volunteer Karen Nordquist.

The extinct shark would have traversed the rivers and wetlands of South Dakota some 67 million years ago. The find, dating to the late Cretaceous period, was presented in the Journal of Paleontology.

== Discovery ==
Galagadon nordquistae was described from small teeth found in limestone originating from the Cheyenne River Indian Reservation in western South Dakota, specifically that left over from the excavation of the remains of Sue the Tyrannosaurus rex. According to William Simpson, the head of geological collections and the collections manager for fossil vertebrates at the Chicago Field Museum, (the museum in which G. nordquistae's teeth are currently housed), the rock matrix removed from SUE's bones was preserved "because there are tiny fossils in the matrix, and I knew that one day I could find a victim some day to go through all of that rock and look for the tiny fossils". (Note: "Matrix" refers here to limestone.)
