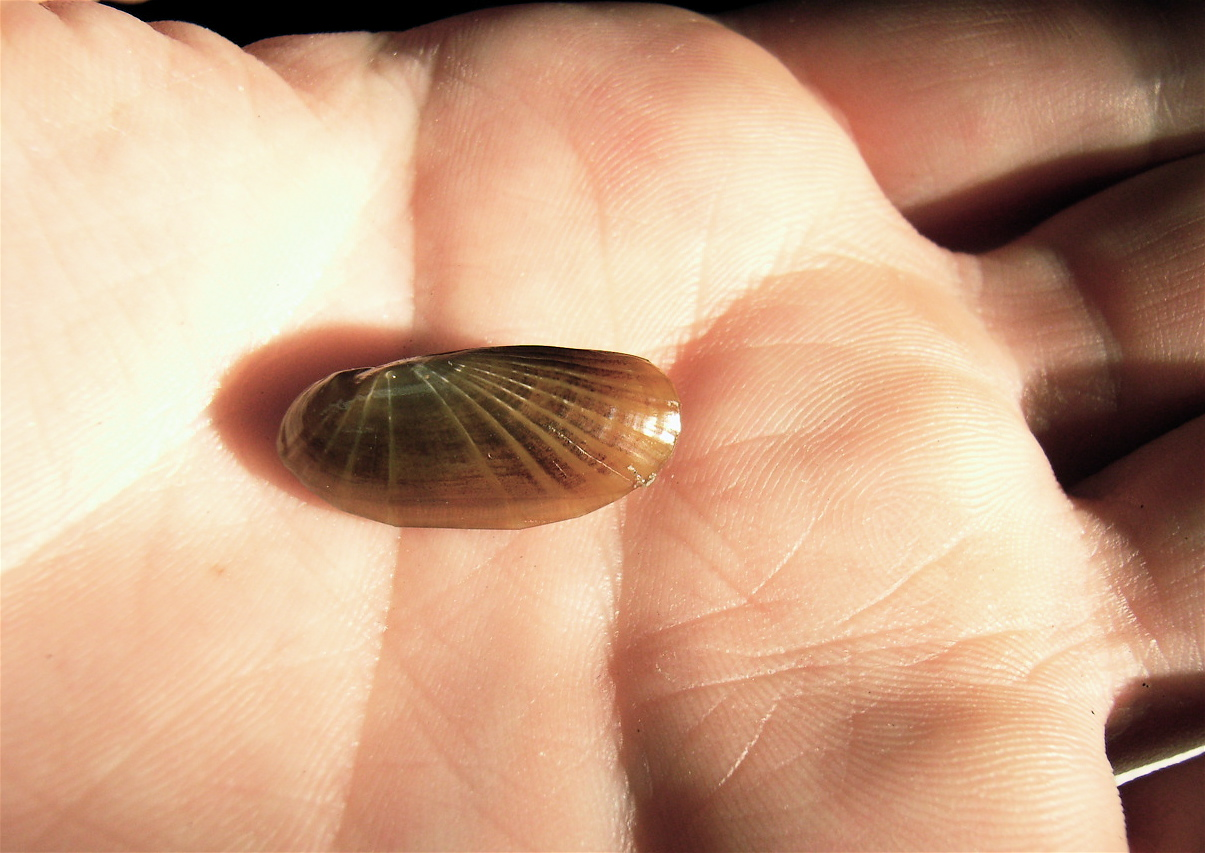
- Solemya velum

Scientific classification
- Domain: Eukaryota
- Kingdom: Animalia
- Phylum: Mollusca
- Class: Bivalvia
- Subclass: Protobranchia
- Order: Solemyida; Dall, 1889

Families
- See text

Synonyms
- Solemyoida

= Solemyida =

Order of bivalves

Solemyida is an order of bivalve molluscs.

== Families in the order Solemyida ==
- Manzanellidae Chronic, 1952
- Solemyidae J. E. Gray, 1840
