= Fox Hills Formation =

Geologic formation in the Great Plains of North America

- Stratigraphic range: Late Cretaceous (Maastrichtian), ~69–68 Ma
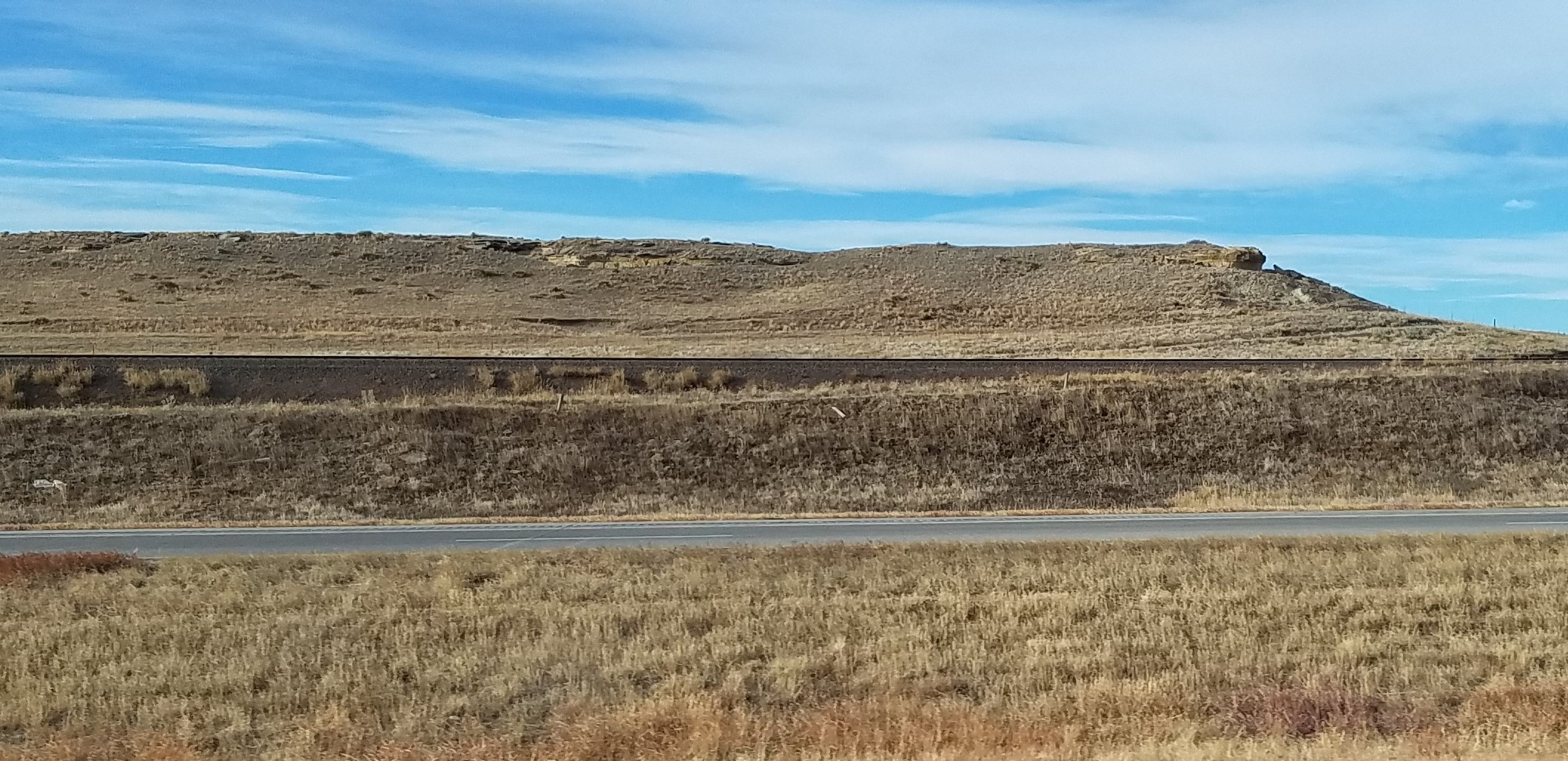
- A ridge capped by a sandstone bed of the Fox Hills Formation west of Limon, Colorado
- Type: Geological formation
- Unit of: Montana Group (MT, ND)
- Sub-units: See text
- Underlies: Lance (WY), Hell Creek (MT); Laramie Formation (CO)
- Overlies: Pierre Shale (ND, SD, CO), Bearpaw Shale (MT), Lewis Shale (WY)
- Thickness: See text

Lithology
- Primary: Sandstone
- Other: Shale, siltstone

Location
- Region: Colorado, Montana, North Dakota, South Dakota and Wyoming
- Country: United States

Type section
- Named for: Fox Hills between Cheyenne and Moreau Rivers, South Dakota
- Named by: Meek and Hayden
- Year defined: 1862

The Fox Hills Formation, also known as the Fox Hills Sandstone, is a Cretaceous geologic formation in the northwestern Great Plains of North America. It is present from North Dakota to Colorado. It has been dated to the Maastrichtian (specifically 69 to 68 Ma), based on ammonite and bivalve biocorrelation. It overlies the Pierre Shale, Bearpaw Formation and Lewis Shale, and is overlain by the Hell Creek, Lance and Laramie formations.

The Fox Hills Formation is a sandy to silty, onshore to nearshore fossiliferous unit which separates the underlying marine shales from the overlying terrestrial formations. Its thickness and geological composition range from area to area, and is of a diachronous nature.

== The Dakotas ==
=== Type area ===
The type area of South Dakota, in the Corson, Dewey and Ziebach counties, shares most of the same members found in North Dakota, with the exception of the North Dakota-exclusive Linton Member. The Trail City Member is clayey silt with fossiliferous concretionary horizons, about 69 feet (21 m) thick in the east and 230 feet (70 m) in the west. The presence of jarosite beds and its higher silt content differentiates it from the Pierre Shale. It possesses highly fossiliferous concretionary horizons.

The Timber Lake Member is sandstone more than 100 feet (30 m) thick in central Dewey County that pinches out westward. It consists mainly of sandstone, locally variable in clay content, grain size and bedding. Like the Trail City below, it also has commonly occurring fossiliferous concretions. The contact point of both Timber Lake and Trail City members is rather gradual, but to the southwest the contact is recognizable in regard to distinctive jarosite beds. The two beds together represent a wedge-shaped body of sand migrating southwest to the shallow Western Interior Seaway during the Maastrichtian.

The uppermost member, the Iron Lightning Member, consists of two differing sandy lithofacies, noticeably different from the clayey, sandy members underneath it. The Bullhead Lithofacies is primarily made up of finely-bedded sand and silty clay, often of a brown coloration. The Colgate Lithofacies is a gray to white, lithic sandstone which occurs commonly in lenticular bodies, often showing prominent cross-bedding and large, dark colored, ovoid concretions. It additionally contains channel deposits, often with coarse debris, including fossils, which are preserved in the base of the channels.

The Linton Member, exclusive to North Dakota, consists of fine to very fine-grained, indurated, siliceous sandstone. Along with the Iron Lightning Member, are suggested to represent deposition within a deltaic complex, similar to the Hell Creek Formation. In particular, the environments could have included bays, estuaries, prodeltas, tidal channels, and various environments associated with a delta-plain and the seaward part of a distributary system. Depths of the water may have reached up to a few hundred feet.

The Fox Hills Formation in this area contains two ammonite zones, the lower Hoploscaphites nicolletii and the higher H. nebrascensis zone above, which is overlain by the marine Breien Member of the Hell Creek Formation. The H. nicolletii Zone represents the lower portion of the upper Maastrichtian, while the H. nebrascensis represents the middle and upper, but not uppermost portion of the upper Maastrichtian. This is based on the biocorrelation of inoceramid bivalves and Discoscaphites species, associated with the zone, with the same fossils from the U.S. Gulf Coastal Plain and northwestern Europe.

=== Fairpoint area ===
In the Fairpoint area of South Dakota lie the Fairpoint and White Owl Creek members. The former and older unit, which overlies the Pierre Shale, is about 160 feet (49 m) thick and comprises mainly of light-colored sands of marine origin, which contain channel incisions, cross beds, and occasional horizons of dark, hematitic concretions. The uppermost part of this member is distinctly continental in which it contains many lignite beds, known as the Stoneville Lithofacies. The younger White Owl Creek Member is primarily composed of sandstone with large iron stained concretions, and an upper unit of sandstones, shales and siltstones, which are brightly colored thanks to post-depositional paleosol development. This area preserves not a single ammonite, making the assignment of zones based on ammonites impossible, so its zone is inferred by correlation to the H. nicolletii Zone.

== Colorado ==
In Colorado, The Fox Hills Formation (and Pierre Shale) crop out in a belt along the Front Range of the Rocky Mountains, from Douglas to Weld County, and consist of sandy shales and sandstones overlain by the nonmarine Laramie Formation. Here, the top of the formation is the Milliken Sandstone Member, a massive cliff-forming sandstone, named after the Milliken, Weld County, Colorado, where it is exposed very well.

At Wildcat Mound, Weld County, the Fox Hills Formation measures approximately 166 feet (51 m) thick, where it consists of three massive sandstone beds separated by thinner shalier intervals.

== Montana ==
In Montana, the Bearpaw Shale coarsens upward and grades into the Fox Hills Formation, which is tan to yellow-orange sandstone in this area, representing lower through upper shoreface environments deposited as the Fox Hills delta prograded out into the seaway. In this area, the uppermost bed is known as the Colgate Member, or the Colgate Sandstone, a fine-grained, typically greenish-gray pale sandstone which on occasion outcrops as notable white cliffs when strongly weathered. This member is suggested to represent a valley, broadly incised and fill deposited under fluvial conditions at first, then filled under estuarine conditions later on.

During stratigraphic discussion, inclusion of the Colgate Member within the Fox Hills Formation becomes problematic, as there is no term established which refer to lower, non-Colgate strata, and there is evidence that the Colgate Member represents a different depositional environment, and perhaps much younger in age. Additionally, the Colgate Member is described as being of a "light brown" colour, but the defining characteristic of the member is that it is noticeably greyish-white to white. It has been proposed to separate the member from the Fox Hills Formation.

== Wyoming (Rock Springs uplift) ==
=== Outcrop types ===
Along the east flank of the Rock Springs Uplift in southwestern Wyoming, the formation is 75–225 feet thick. The lower part is usually under 100 feet (30 m) and consists of steeply inclined, step-like slopes which are composed of mostly gray shale, interbedded with thin, resistant brown and tan sandstone and siltstone which forms ledges. Above these slopes, thick sandstone beds rise abruptly 50–150 feet (15–46 m) to form tan and brown cliffs and benches. This sandstone is often overlain by light-gray or white sandstone, forming cap rocks along the Fox Hills outcrops, which measures up to 45 feet (14 m). In turn, these lighter colored sandstones are overlain by and partially interfingered by less resistant tan sandstone, carbonaceous shale, interbedded gray mudstone, and coal, which composes the base of the Lance Formation. The beds which form the Fox Hills Formation often appear persistent laterally, and seem to be uniform thickness-wise along outcrops. However, these outcrops seldom parallel the facies strike, and the result of this is that the majority of beds are broadly lenticular.

=== Composition and thickness ===
The Fox Hills Formation is composed of mostly brown, gray, tan or white sandstone, with some interbedded brown or tan siltstone and gray shale. Also present are interbeds of brown or gray carbonaceous shale, gray dolomite, and coal. The formation varies in overall thickness, approximately 75–225 feet (23–69 m), which depends on where the upper and lower interfingered contacts are placed. The sandstone beds which form the basis of the unit compose of mostly quartz grains, which transition from silty and very fine at the base, to medium to coarse at the top.

=== Depositional environment ===
The Fox Hills Formation consists of the eroded remnants of three barrier-island chains that offlapped eastward as the seaway retreated. Beds of shale and sandstone, which were deposited associated with tidal inlets and a sound, separate the barrier islands along the chains.

The formation's barrier islands, usually 3–7 miles (4.8–11.3 km) in length, were deposited within shorelines alongside moderately high tides dominated by waves. Tidal inlets were common, ebb-tidal deltas ranged from moderate to large, and flood-tidal deltas were on the larger end in size. These fulfill the criteria to be considered mesotidal barrier islands, according to the classification of Hayes and Kana (1976). The tidal ranges, approximately 4–10 feet (1.2–3.0 m), higher than average for most eastern shorelines of the Western Interior Seaway. This can be explained via the focusing effect, as these tides converged forwards to the head of the coastal embayment, where the barrier islands were located. Sedimentary structures located within shoreline sandstones, and the general configuration and location of accretionary swash bars leave room for little doubt that the dominant longshore currents and sediment transport directions flowed north to south.

== Paleontology ==
The Fox Hills Formation, a fossiliferous unit, contains multiple beds of oyster (Crassostrea) shells. These beds measure in thickness from under 1 foot (0.30 m) to over 15 feet (4.6 m). These mainly occur as lenticular coquinas composed of shells and shell fragments which were transported and deposited in ebb-tidal deltas, flood-tidal deltas, and tidal channels. Influence from tidal currents on the deposition of some of the coquinas is discernible by shell material being directionally oriented. These lenticular coquinas are also present on the upper surface of forebeach sandstones of barrier islands, and in middle shoreface sandstones.

Also present in the formation are several ammonites, including Baculites larsoni, B. columna, and an indeterminate species, Hoploscaphites nicolletii, H. spedeni, Discoscaphites gulosus, D. conradi, and Sphenodiscus lobatus. The formation's belemnites include Belemnitella bulbosa and B. badlandsensis.

Abundant in the Fox Hills Formation are trace fossils, especially in the more marine, lower strata. These include genera Helminthoidea and Terebellina, which are quite common in lower shoreface sandstone, while in the middle shoreface Cylindrichnus and Ophiomorpha are present. Arenicolites and Thalassinoides are identified in accretionary swash bar sandstones.

Vertebrates include amphibians such as the salamanders Opisthotriton kayi, Lisserpeton bairdi; the turtles Basilemys and Lophochelys, the champsosaurid Champsosaurus laramiensis, the mosasaurids Mosasaurus hoffmanni and ?Plioplatecarpus, the theropods cf. Saurornitholestes and Tyrannosaurus, the eusuchian Borealosuchus, as well as indeterminate reptilian and bird remains.

== Paleobiota ==
Color key
Taxon	Reclassified taxon	Taxon falsely reported as present	Dubious taxon or junior synonym	Ichnotaxon	Ootaxon	Morphotaxon

Notes
Uncertain or tentative taxa are in small text; ~~crossed out~~ taxa are discredited.

=== Caudata ===
Caudates of the Fox Hills Formation
Genus	Species	Clade	Image
Lisserpeton	L. bairdi	Urodela, Scapherpetontidae	
Opisthotriton	O. kayi	Batrachosauroididae	

=== Chondrichthyans ===
Chondrichthyans of the Fox Hills Formation
Genus	Species	Clade	Image
Carcharias	C. cf. C. tenuiplicatus	Lamniformes, Carchariidae	Portrait of the related extant Grey Nurse Shark (Carcharias taurus).
Ewingia	E. cf. E. problematica	Myliobatiformes, Batomorphii incertae sedis	
Galeorhinus	G. cf. G. girardoti	Carcharhiniformes, Triakidae	Drawing of the related G. girardoti.
Ischyodus	I. rayhaasi	Chimaeriformes, Callorhynchidae	Fossil of the related I. avitus.
Ischyodus	I. sp.	Chimaeriformes, Callorhynchidae	Fossil of the related I. avitus.
Ischyrhiza	I. avonicola	Rajiformes, Ganopristidae	
Myledaphus	M. bipartitus	Rajiformes, incertae sedis	
Mylognathus (Remains reassigned to Ischyodus rayhassi)	M. priscus	Chimaeriformes, Callorhynchidae	
Palaeogaleus	P. sp.	Carcharhiniformes, Triakidae	
Pseudohypolophus	P. mcnultyi	Carcharhiniformes, Triakidae	
Protoplatyrhina	P. renae	Rajiformes, incertae sedis	
Ptychotrygon	P. cf. P. vermiculata	Rajiformes, Ptychotrygonidae	
Rhombodus	R. levis	Myliobatiformes, Rhombodontidae	
Sclerorhynchus	S. sp.	Rajiformes, Ganopristidae	

=== Testudines ===
Testudines of the Fox Hills Formation
Genus	Species	Clade	Image
Basilemys	B. sp.	Eucryptodira, Nanhsiungchelyidae	Skeleton of the related Basilemys variolosa.
Lophochelys	L. sp.	Panchelonioidea, Toxochelyidae	

=== Theropoda ===
Theropods of the Fox Hills Formation
Genus	Species	Clade	Image
Saurornitholestes	cf. S. sp.	Paraves, Dromaeosauridae	Life reconstruction of the related S. langstoni.
Tyrannosaurus	T. sp.	Tyrannosauroidea, Tyrannosauridae	Life restoration of the related T. mcraeensis.
Aves indet.	sp. indet.	Aves, incertae sedis	
Ornithomimidae indet.	sp. indet.	Ornithomimosauria, Ornithomimidae	

=== Mosasauria ===
Mosasaurs of the Fox Hills Formation
Genus	Species	Clade	Image
Mosasaurus	M. dekayi (Synonym of M. hoffmanni)	Mosasauria, Mosasauridae	Life restoration of M. hoffmani.
Mosasaurus	M. hoffmanni	Mosasauria, Mosasauridae	Life restoration of M. hoffmani.
Plioplatecarpus	P. sp.	Mosasauria, Plioplatecarpinae	Plioplatecarpus skull.

=== Other vertebrates ===
Other vertebrates of the Fox Hills Formation
Genus	Species	Clade	Image
Borealosuchus	B. sp.	Eusuchia, incertae sedis	
Champsosaurus	C. laramiensis	Neochoristodera, incertae sedis	

=== Cephalopoda ===
Cephalopods of the Fox Hills Formation
Genus	Species	Clade	Image
Baculites	B. columna	Ammonitida, Baculitidae	Life reconstruction of Baculites.
Baculites	B. larsoni	Ammonitida, Baculitidae	Life reconstruction of Baculites.
Baculites	B. sp.	Ammonitida, Baculitidae	Life reconstruction of Baculites.
Belemnitella	B. badlandsensis	Belemnitida, Belemnitellidae	Two fossils of the related B. americana.
Belemnitella	B. bulbosa	Belemnitida, Belemnitellidae	Two fossils of the related B. americana.
Coahuilites	C. sheltoni	Ammonitida, Sphenodiscidae	
Discoscaphites	D. gulosus	Ammonitida, Scaphitidae	Fossil of the related Discoscaphites iris.
Discoscaphites	D. conradi	Ammonitida, Scaphitidae	Fossil of the related Discoscaphites iris.
Hoploscaphites	H. nicolletii	Ammonitida, Scaphitidae	Life restoration of the related Hoploscaphites constrictus.
Hoploscaphites	H. spedeni	Ammonitida, Scaphitidae	Life restoration of the related Hoploscaphites constrictus.
Jeletzkytes	J. nebrascensis	Ammonitida, Scaphitidae	
Sphenodiscus	S. lobatus	Ammonitida, Sphenodiscidae	Opalized fossil of Sphenodiscus.
Sphenodiscus	S. pleurisepta	Ammonitida, Sphenodiscidae	Opalized fossil of Sphenodiscus.

=== Other invertebrates ===
Other invertebrates of the Fox Hills Formation
Genus	Species	Clade	Image
Callianassa	C. sp.	Decapoda, Callianassidae	
Crassostrea	C. sp.	Ostreida, Ostreidae	Specimen of the extant relative C. gigas.
Neritoptyx	N. hogansoni		
Palaeocypraea	P. (P.) squyeri	Littorinimorpha, Cypraeidae	

=== Ichnotaxa ===
Ichnotaxa of the Fox Hills Formation
Genus	Species	Notes	Image
Arenicolites	A. sp.		
Cylindrichnus	C. sp.		
Helminthoidea	H. sp.		
Ophiomorpha	O. sp.		
Terebellina	T. sp.		
Thalassinoides	T. sp.		

=== Plants ===
Flora of the Fox Hills Formation
Genus	Species	Clade	Image
Marmarthia	M. johnsonii	Laurales, Lauraceae	
Mesocyparis	M. borealis	Cupressales, Cupressaceae	Fossil of the related M. sp. (Klondike Mountain Formation)
Nilssoniocladus	N. comtula	Cycadales, incertae sedis	
Nilssoniocladus	N. yukonensis	Cycadales, incertae sedis	
Paloreodoxites	P. plicatus	Zingiberales, incertae sedis	
Rhamnus	R. salicifolius	Rhamnales, Rhamneae	
Zingiberopsis	Z. magnifolia	Zingiberales, Zingiberaceae	

== See also ==
- List of dinosaur-bearing rock formations
  - List of stratigraphic units with indeterminate dinosaur fossils
