= List of the Mesozoic life of Arkansas =

This list of the Mesozoic life of Arkansas contains the various prehistoric life-forms whose fossilized remains have been reported from within the US state of Arkansas and are between 252.17 and 66 million years of age.

== A ==
- †Acutostrea
  - †Acutostrea plumosa
- †Aechmella
  - †Aechmella ozanensis – type locality for species
- Alderina
  - †Alderina inuber – type locality for species
- †Ambigostrea
  - †Ambigostrea tecticosta
- †Anchura
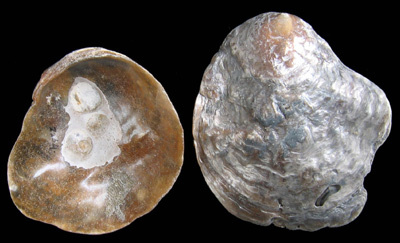
- Interior and exterior of a shell of an Anomia, or jingle shell
  †Anomia
  - †Anomia argentaria
  - †Anomia texana
- †Aphrodina
  - †Aphrodina tippana
- †Atreta

== B ==
- †Baculites
  - †Baculites crickmayi
  - †Baculites ovatus
  - †Baculites reduncus
  - †Baculites taylorensis
  - †Baculites undatus
- †Bellifusus
  - †Bellifusus spinosus
- Botula
  - †Botula conchafodentis
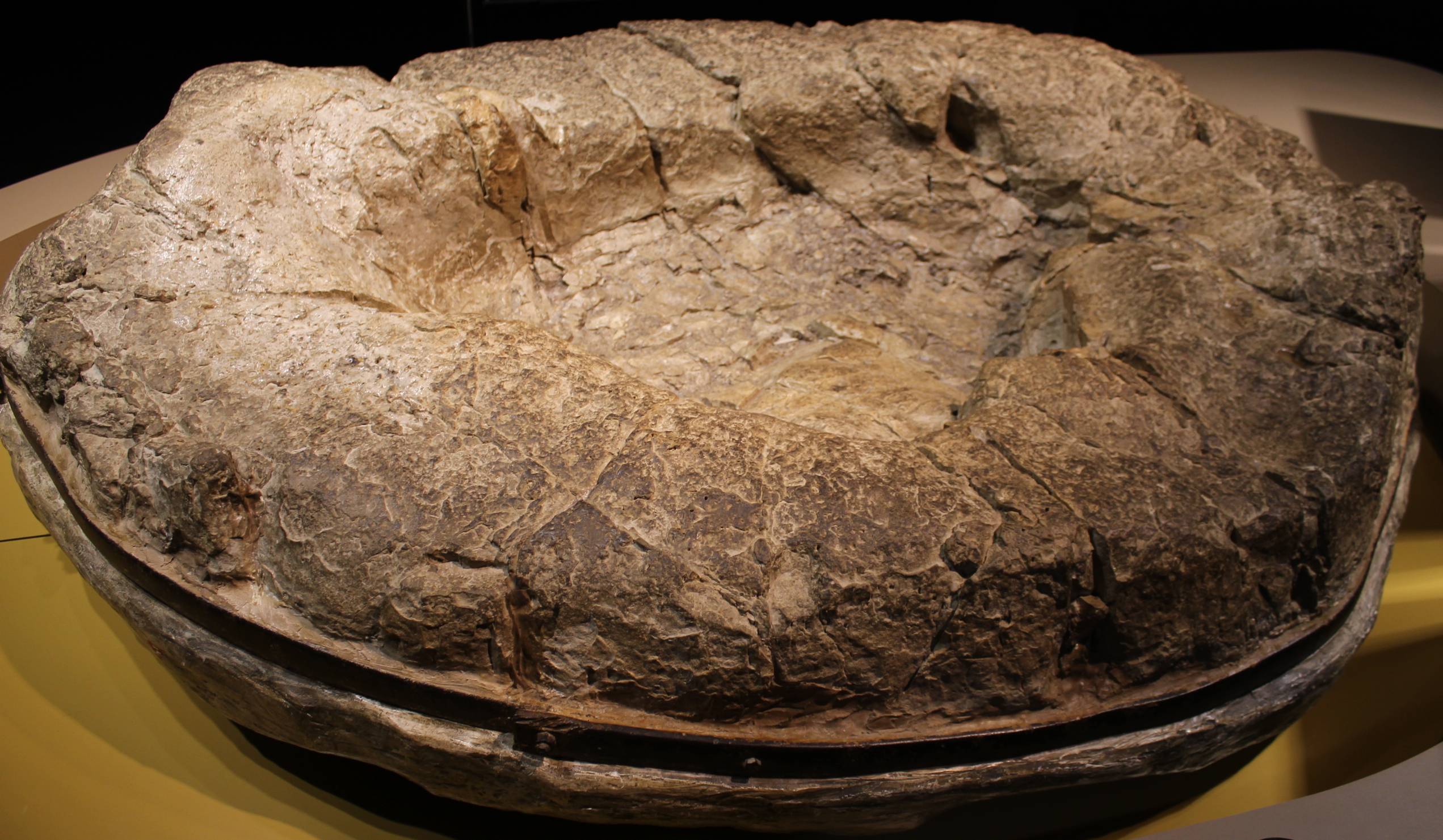
- Fossil of the sauropod dinosaur footprint ichnogenus Brontopodus
  †Brontopodus
  - †Brontopodus birdi
- †Buccinopsis
  - †Buccinopsis solida

== C ==
- Cadulus
  - †Cadulus obnutus
- Caestocorbula
  - †Caestocorbula crassaplica
  - †Caestocorbula crassiplica
- †Camptonectes
  - †Camptonectes bubonis
- †Cardiaster
  - †Cardiaster deciper – type locality for species
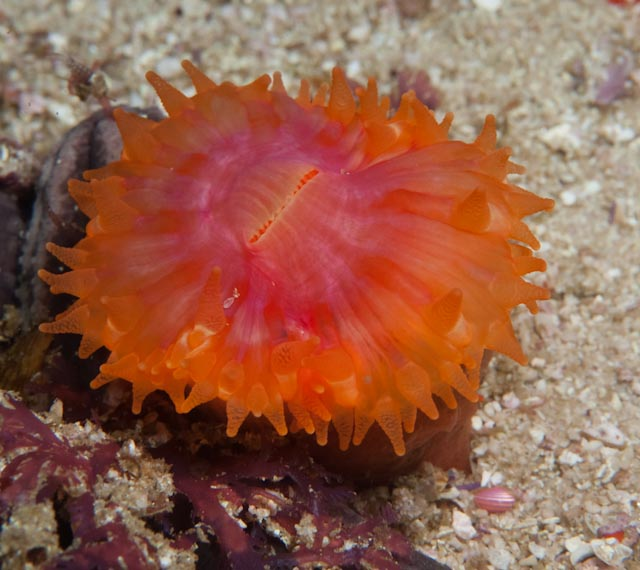
- A living Caryophyllia solitary coral
  Caryophyllia
  - †Caryophyllia konincki
- †Castanopora
  - †Castanopora spooneri
- †Chedighaii – type locality for genus
  - †Chedighaii barberi – type locality for species
- †Cheethamia – type locality for genus
  - †Cheethamia howei – type locality for species
- †Cirroceras
  - †Cirroceras conradi
- †Classopollis
- †Classostrobus
  - †Classostrobus arkansensis
- Cliona
- Corbicula
  - †Corbicula arkansensis
- Crassatella
  - †Crassatella vadosa
- †Crenella
  - †Crenella serica
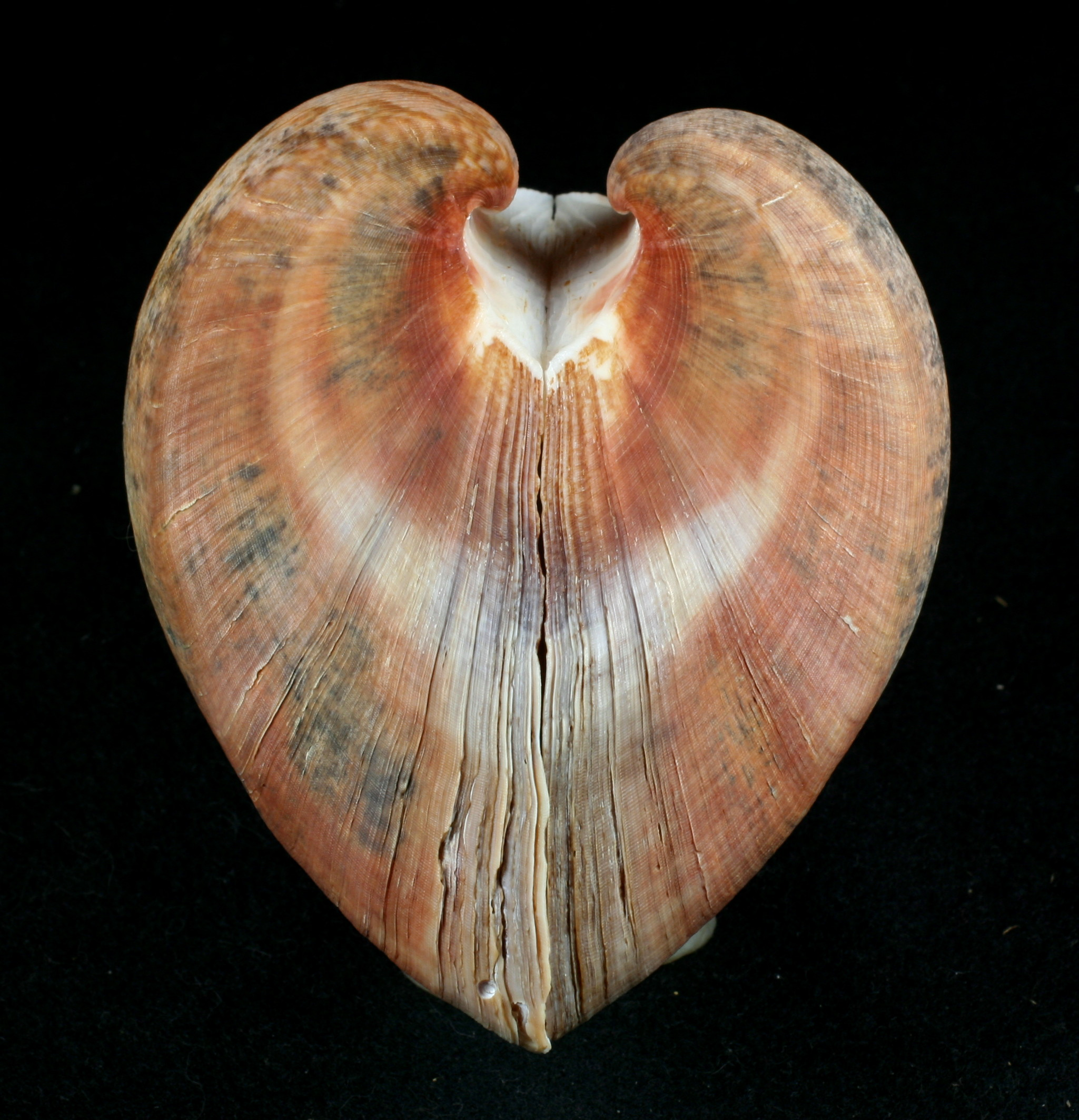
- Shell of a Cucullaea, or false ark shell
  Cucullaea
  - †Cucullaea capax
- Cylichna
- †Cymella
  - †Cymella bella
- †Cyprimeria
  - †Cyprimeria alta
  - †Cyprimeria coonensis

== D ==
- †Dentalium
  - †Dentalium leve
- †Desmophyllites
  - †Desmophyllites diphylloides
- †Dhondtichlamys
  - †Dhondtichlamys venustus
- †Diacanthopora
  - †Diacanthopora langi – type locality for species
- †Didymoceras
  - †Didymoceras binodosum
  - †Didymoceras clardyi
  - †Didymoceras cochleatum
  - †Didymoceras donezianum
  - †Didymoceras draconis
  - †Didymoceras mortoni
  - †Didymoceras platycostatum
  - †Didymoceras tortum
- †Dionella
  - †Dionella racemata – type locality for species
  - †Dionella vivistratensis – type locality for species
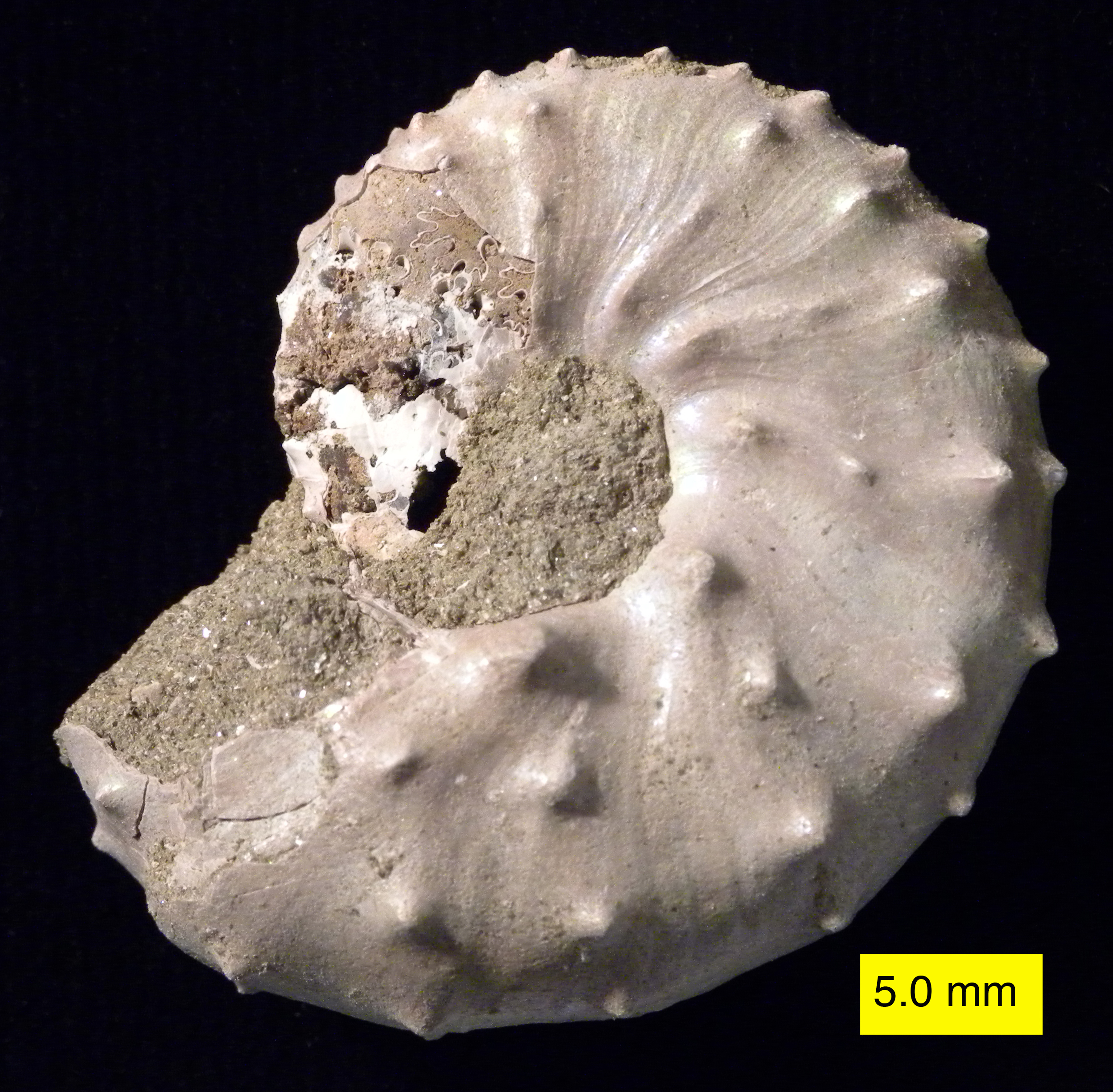
- Fossilized shell of the Late Cretaceous ammonoid cephalopod Discoscaphites
  †Discoscaphites
  - †Discoscaphites conradi
- †Douvilleiceras

== E ==
- †Echinocorys
  - †Echinocorys texanus
- Ellisina
  - †Ellisina saratogaensis – type locality for species
- †Escharoides – tentative report
  - †Escharoides danei – type locality for species
  - †Escharoides erymnos – type locality for species
- †Eutrephoceras
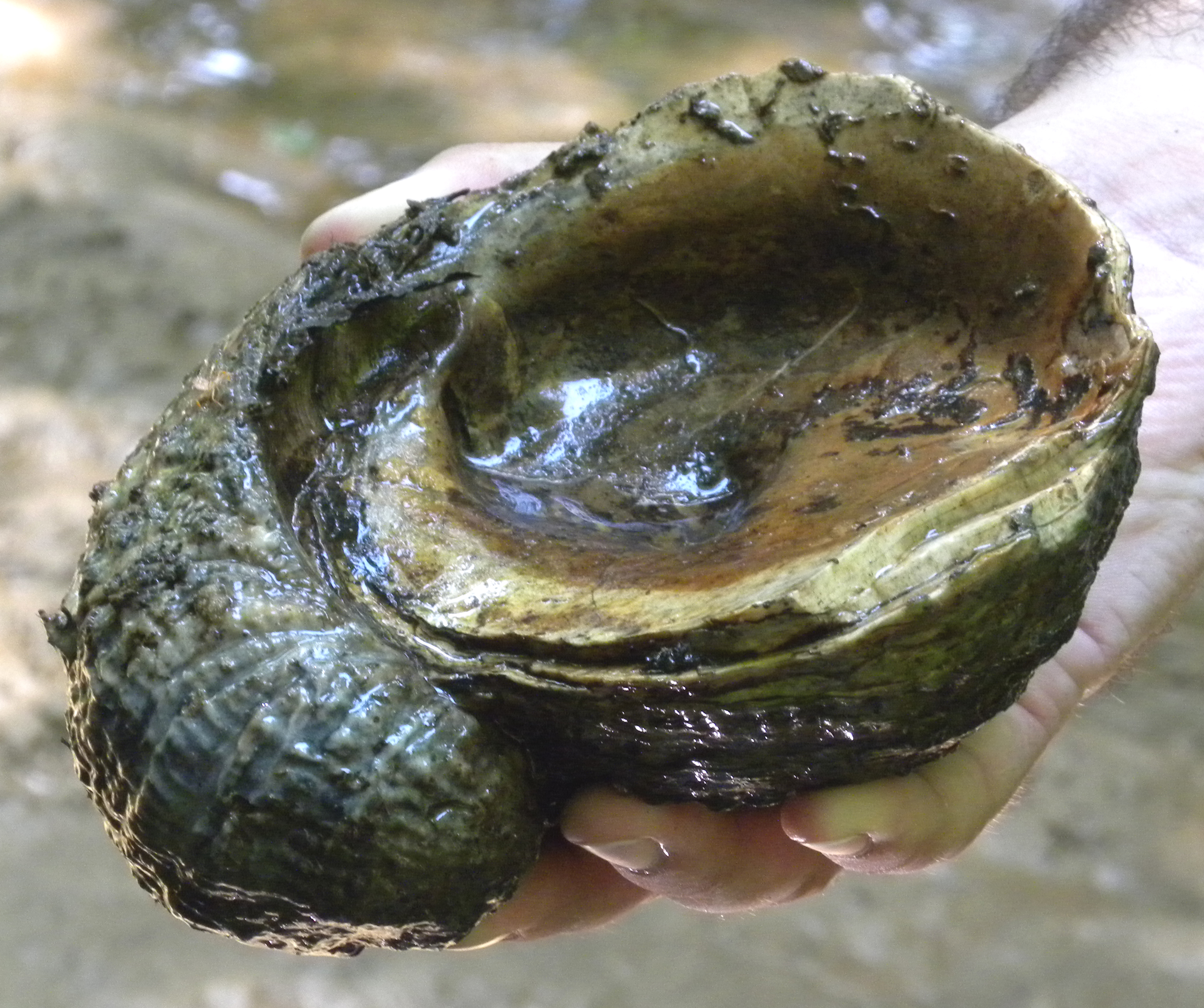
- Interior of a fossilized shell of the Jurassic-Cretaceous foam oyster Exogyra
  †Exogyra
  - †Exogyra costata
  - †Exogyra ponderosa

== F ==
- †Flemingostrea
  - †Flemingostrea subspatula
- †Frurionella
  - †Frurionella parvipora

== G ==
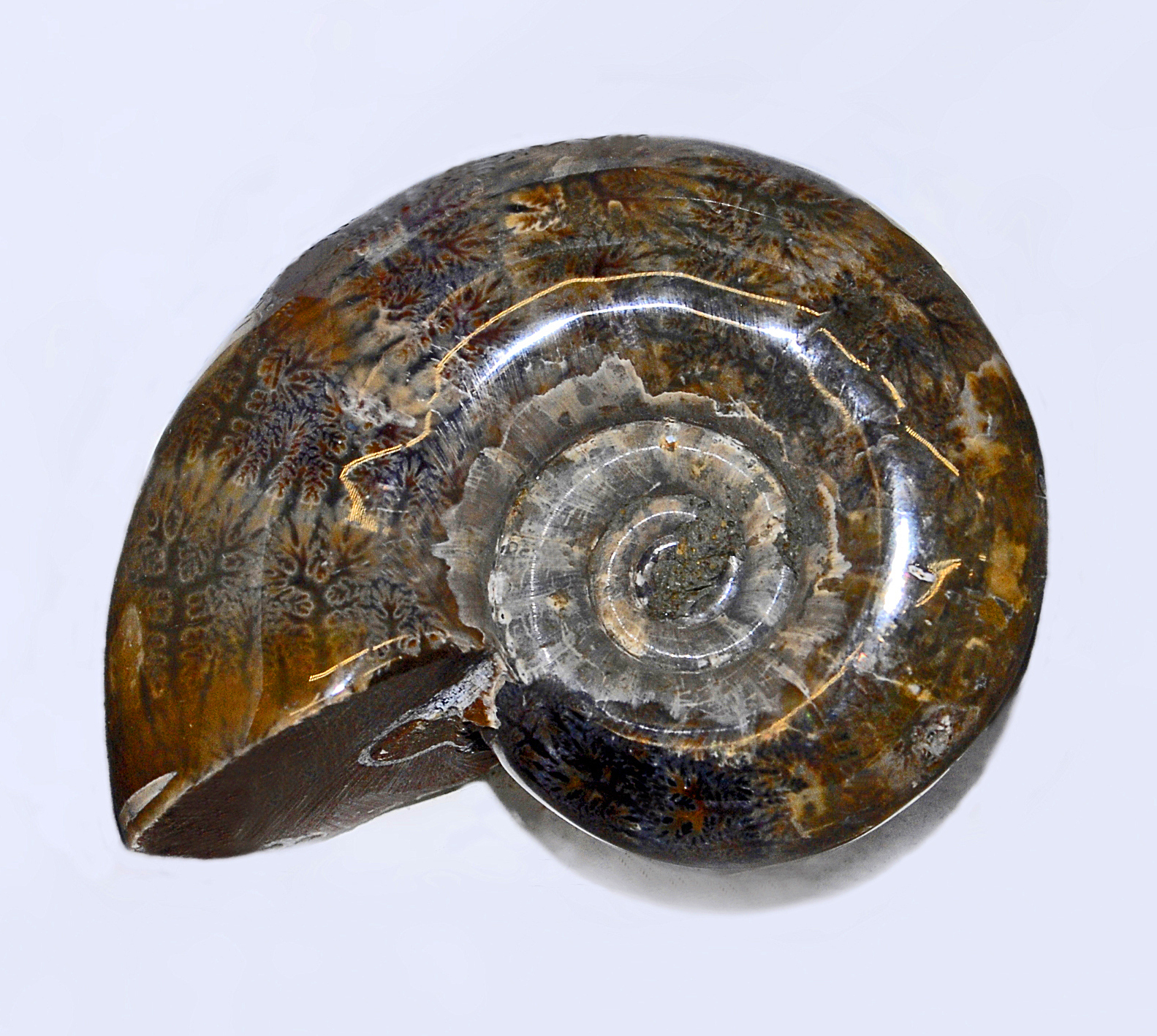
- Fossilized shell of the Cretaceous ammonoid cephalopod Gaudryceras
  †Gaudryceras
- †Granocardium
  - †Granocardium bowenae
  - †Granocardium tholi
- †Gryphaeostrea
  - †Gryphaeostrea vomer

== H ==
- Hemiaster
  - †Hemiaster humphreysanus
  - †Hemiaster wetherbyi
- †Heminautilus
  - †Heminautilus stantoni – type locality for species
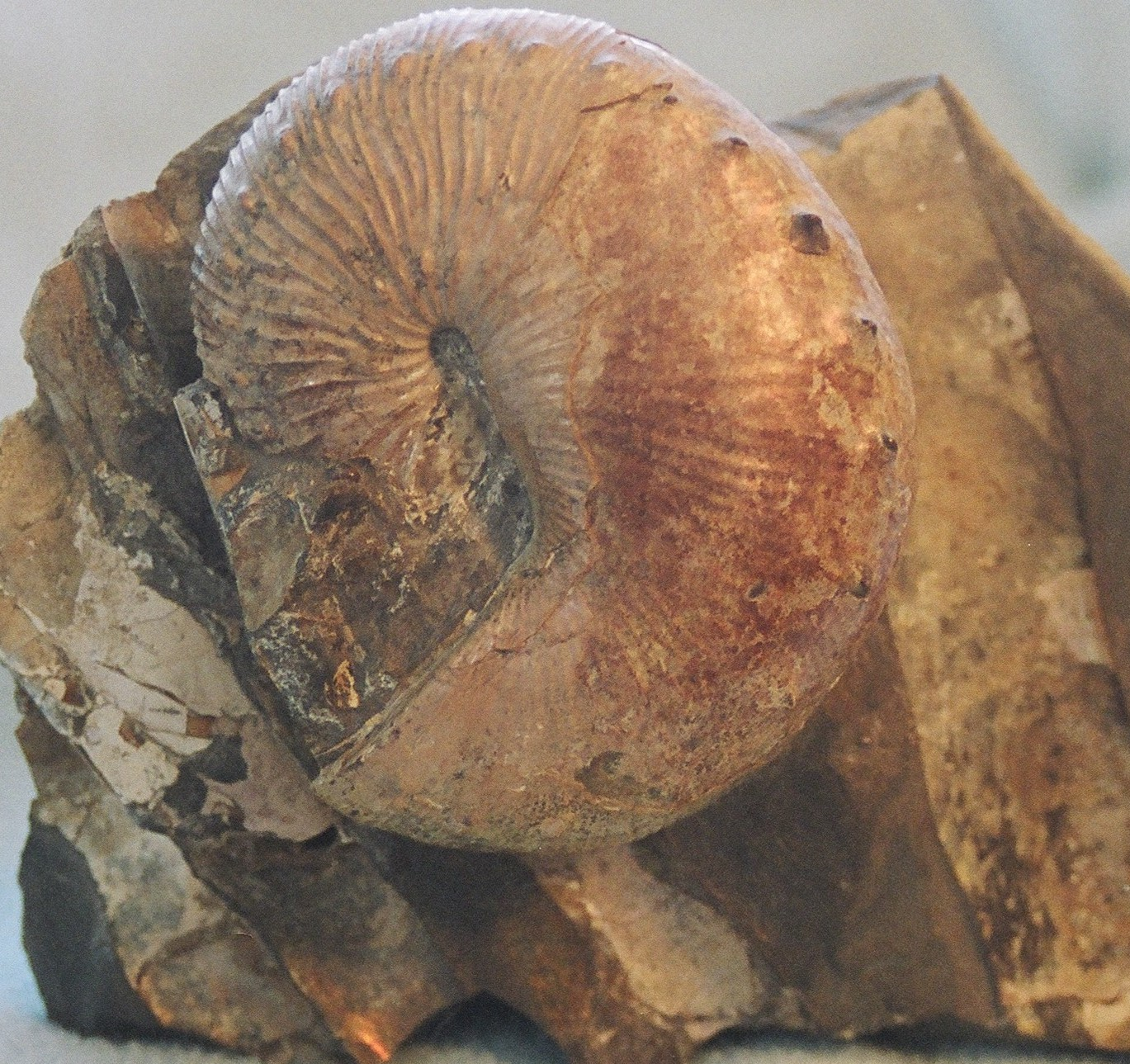
- Fossilized shell of the Late Cretaceous ammonoid cephalopod Hoploscaphites
  †Hoploscaphites
  - †Hoploscaphites pumilis

== I ==
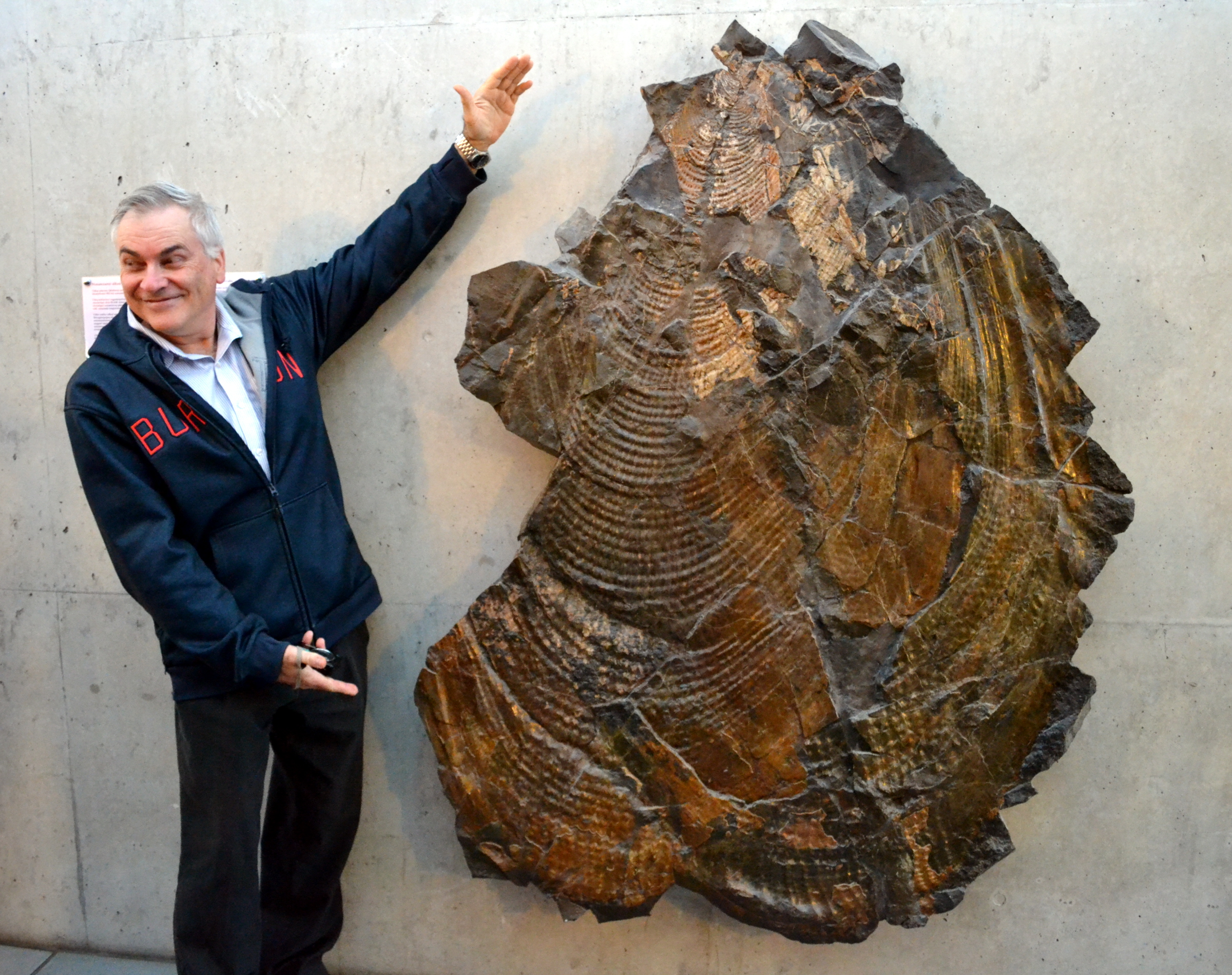
- Fossilized shell of the Early Jurassic-Late Cretaceous marine bivalve Inoceramus with a human indicating its size
  †Inoceramus
- †Isomicraster
  - †Isomicraster danei – type locality for species

== J ==
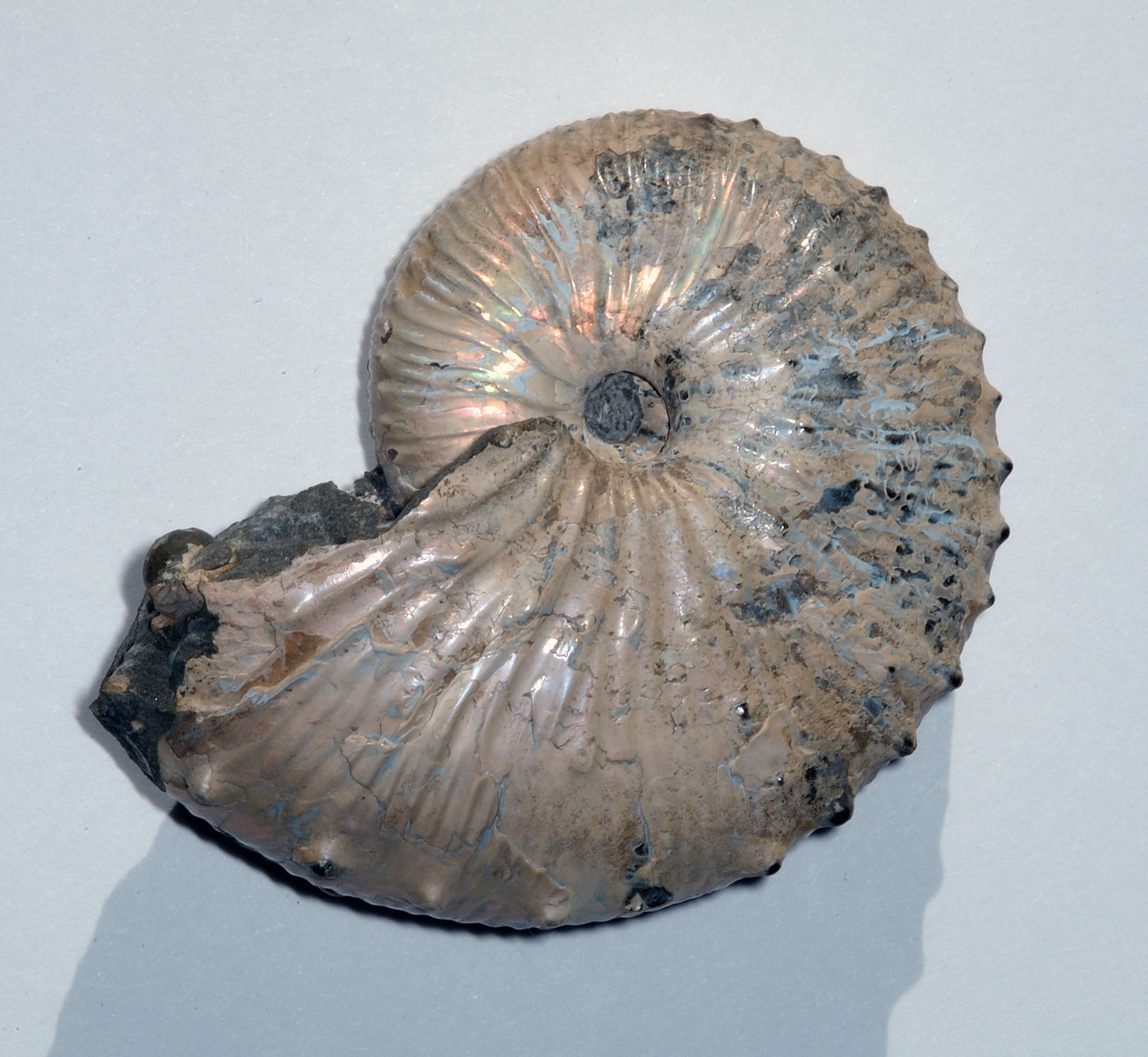
- Fossilized shell of the Late Cretaceous ammonoid cephalopod Jeletzkytes
  †Jeletzkytes
  - †Jeletzkytes nodosus

== L ==
- †Lewyites
  - †Lewyites oronensis
- Limatula
  - †Limatula acutilineata
- †Linthia
  - †Linthia variabilis

== M ==
- Malletia
  - †Malletia longfrons
  - †Malletia longifrons
- †Mathilda
  - †Mathilda ripleyana – or unidentified related form
- †Menuites
  - †Menuites portlocki – or unidentified comparable form
- †Micrabacia
  - †Micrabacia arkansasensis – type locality for species
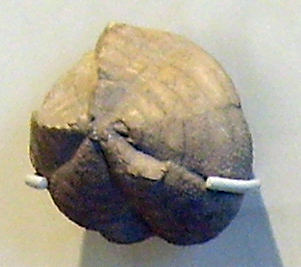
- Fossilized shell of the Late Cretaceous-Paleogene sea urchin Micraster
  †Micraster
  - †Micraster americanus
- Micropora – tentative report

== N ==
- †Naomichelys
- †Neancyloceras
  - †Neancyloceras bipunctatum – or unidentified comparable form
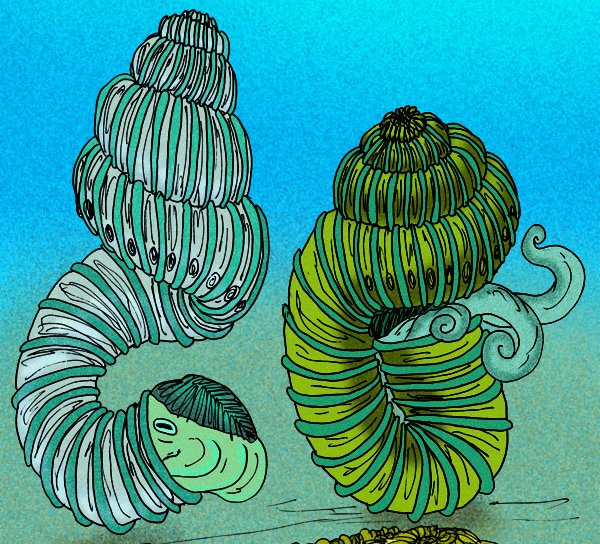
- Restoration of several species of the Late Cretaceous ammonoid cephalopod Nostoceras
  †Nostoceras
  - †Nostoceras approximans
  - †Nostoceras archiacianum
  - †Nostoceras arkansanum
  - †Nostoceras colubriformis
  - †Nostoceras helicinus
  - †Nostoceras hyatti
  - †Nostoceras multituberculatum
  - †Nostoceras pauper
  - †Nostoceras plerucostatum
  - †Nostoceras pulcher
- Nuculana
  - †Nuculana whitfieldi

== O ==
- †Oxybeloceras
  - †Oxybeloceras crassum

== P ==
- †Pachydiscus
  - †Pachydiscus arkansanus
- Panopea
  - †Panopea subplicata
- †Placenticeras
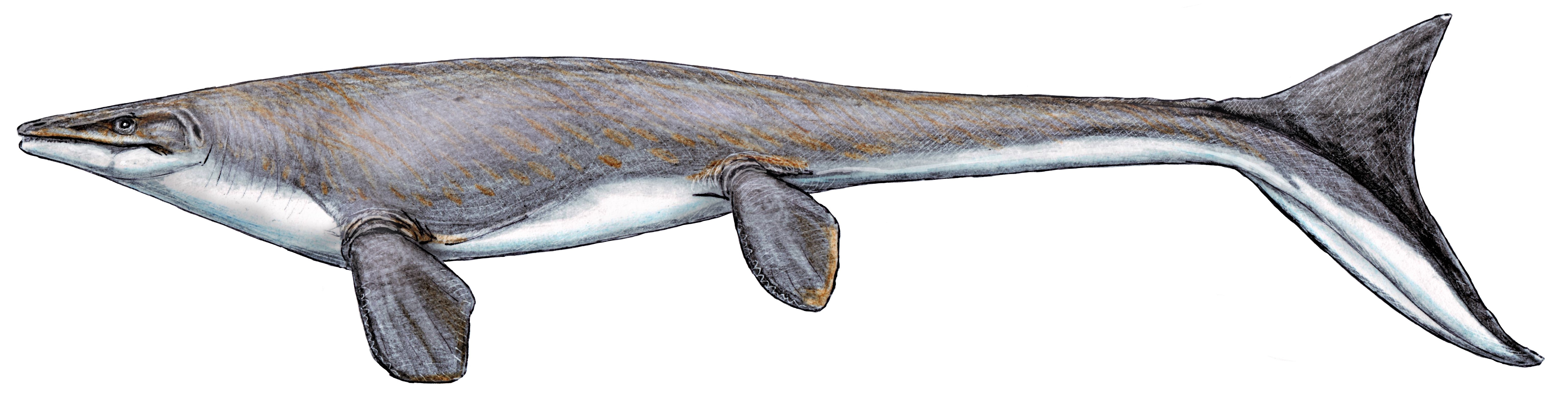
- Restoration of the Late Cretaceous mosasaur Platecarpus
  †Platecarpus
- †Pleuriocardia
- †Prionochelys – type locality for genus
  - †Prionochelys nauta – type locality for species
- †Protocardia
  - †Protocardia spillmani
- †Pseudofrenelopsis
  - †Pseudofrenelopsis parceramosa
- †Pseudokossmaticeras
  - †Pseudokossmaticeras galicianum
- †Pseudophyllites
- †Pseudosaynella
  - †Pseudosaynella fimbriata – type locality for species
  - †Pseudosaynella walcotti
- †Pteria
- †Pterotrigonia
  - †Pterotrigonia thoracica
- Pulvinites
  - †Pulvinites argenteus
- Pycnodonte
  - †Pycnodonte vesiculare
  - †Pycnodonte vesicularis
- †Pyropsis

== R ==
- Ramphonotus
  - †Ramphonotus pedunculatus – type locality for species

== S ==
- Serpula
- †Solenoceras
  - †Solenoceras texanum – or unidentified comparable form
- †Solenophragma
  - †Solenophragma elongatum – type locality for species
  - †Solenophragma ovatum
- †Sphenodiscus
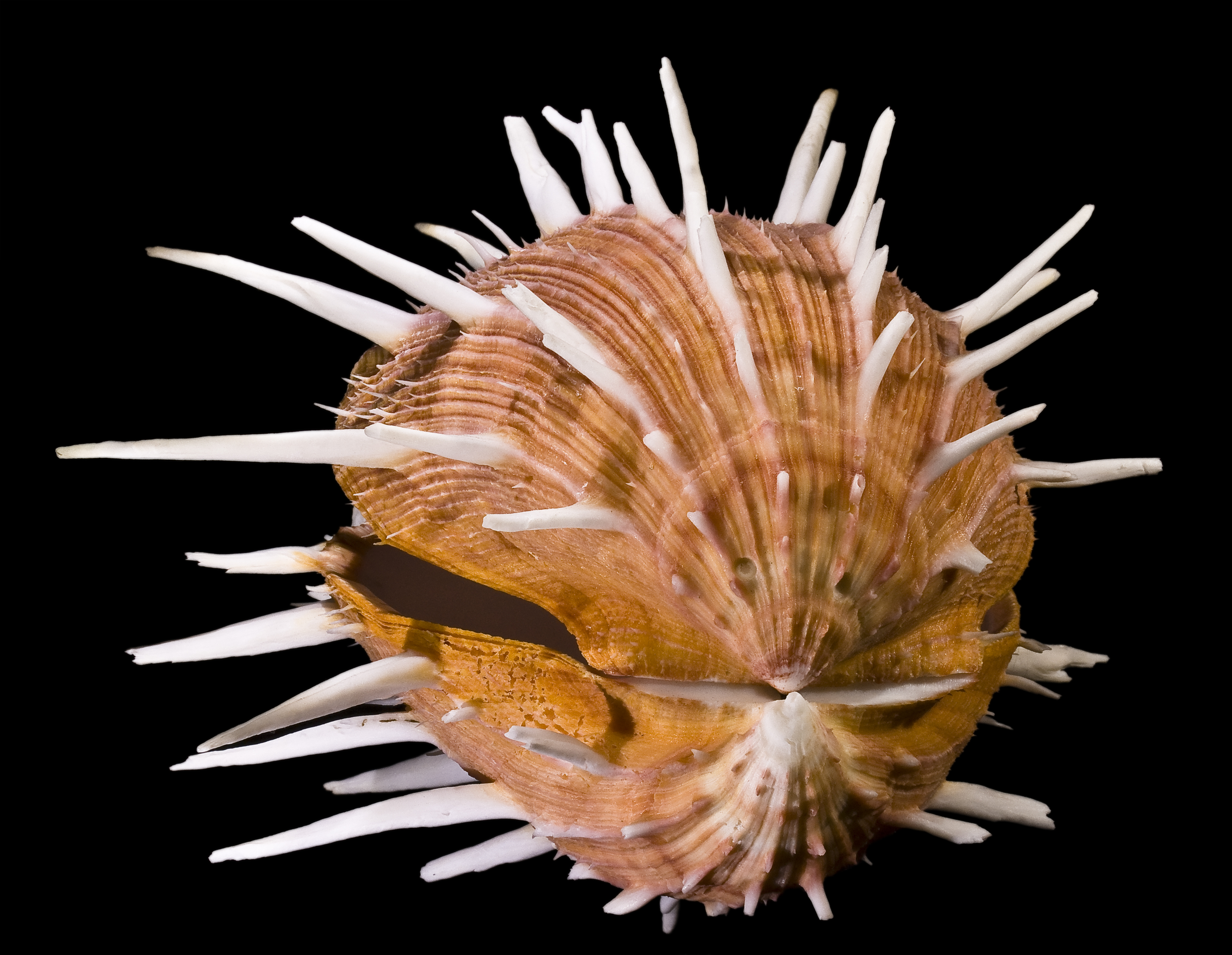
- Shell of a Spondylus, or spiny oyster
  Spondylus
- †Stictostega – type locality for genus
  - †Stictostega durhami – type locality for species
- Striarca
- †Striaticostatum
- †Stylina
  - †Stylina arkansasensis – type locality for species
- †Syncyclonema
  - †Syncyclonema simplicius
  - †Syncyclonema travisanus

== T ==
- †Tenea
  - †Tenea parilis
- †Thamnasteria
  - †Thamnasteria imlayi – type locality for species
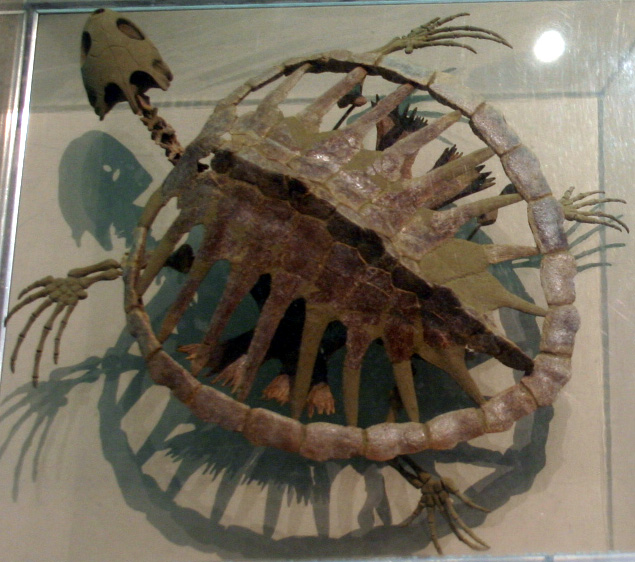
- Mounted fossilized skeleton of the Late Cretaceous sea turtle Toxochelys
  †Toxochelys – type locality for genus
  - †Toxochelys latiremis – type locality for species
- Trachycardium
- †Trachyscaphites
  - †Trachyscaphites redbirdensis
- †Tricephalopora
  - †Tricephalopora arkansasensis – type locality for species
  - †Tricephalopora larwoodi – type locality for species
- Turritella
  - †Turritella bilira
  - †Turritella trilira

== U ==
- †Uhligella – tentative report

== V ==
- †Veniella
  - †Veniella conradi

== Z ==
- Zangerlchelys
  - †Zangerlchelys arkansaw – type locality for species
