= Fresvillia =

Fresvillia Temporal range: Late Cretaceous to earliest Paleocene

Scientific classification
- Kingdom: Animalia
- Phylum: Mollusca
- Class: Cephalopoda
- Subclass: †Ammonoidea
- Order: †Ammonitida
- Suborder: †Ancyloceratina
- Family: †Baculitidae
- Genus: †Fresvillia; Kennedy, 1986

Genus of molluscs (fossil)

Fresvillia is an extinct cephalopod genus belonging to baculitid family of the ammonoid order Ancyloceratida that lived during the Late Cretaceous, found in France. Baculitids are a kind of heteromorph ammonite characterized by a straight adult shaft, often preceded by a small coiled juvenile portion. An indeterminate species of Fresvillia may have briefly survived the K-Pg mass extinction event.

Baculites, Boehmoceras, Eubaculites, and Lechites, are among related genera.
