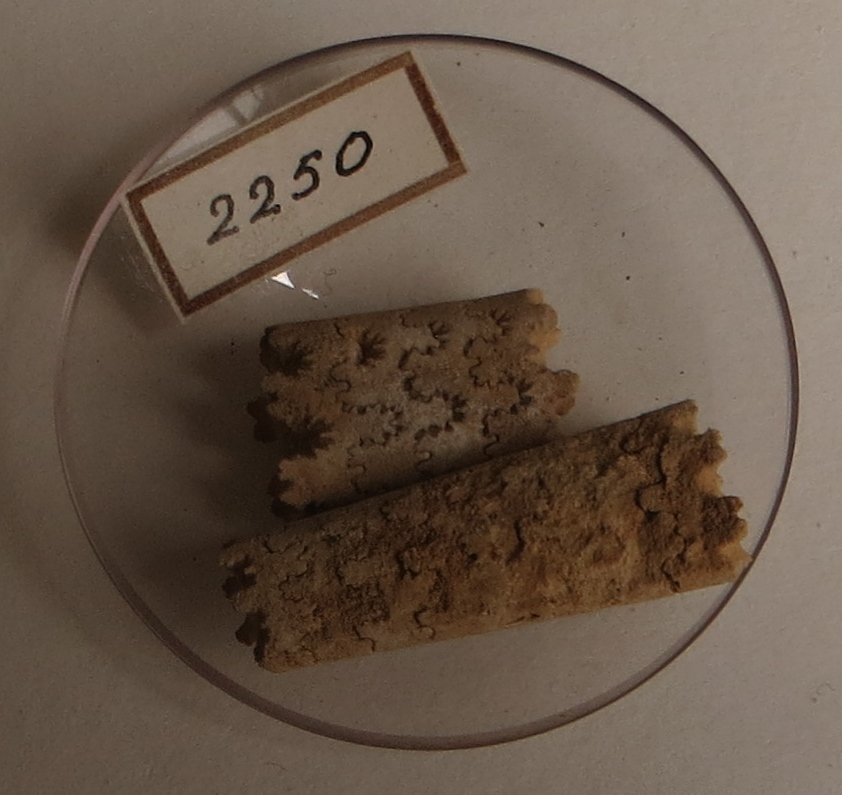
- Eubaculites faujasi fossils in the Teylers Museum, The Netherlands

Scientific classification
- Kingdom: Animalia
- Phylum: Mollusca
- Class: Cephalopoda
- Subclass: †Ammonoidea
- Order: †Ammonitida
- Suborder: †Ancyloceratina
- Family: †Baculitidae
- Genus: †Eubaculites; Spath, 1926

Type species
- †Eubaculites ootacodensis (Stoliczka, 1866)

Other species
- †Eubaculites carinatus (Morton, 1834); †Eubaculites faujasi (Lamarck, 1822); †Eubaculites labyrinthicus (Morton, 1834); †Eubaculites latecarinatus (Brunnschweiler, 1966); †Eubaculites simplex (Kossmat, 1895); †Eubaculites vagina (Forbes, 1846)

= Eubaculites =

Eubaculites Temporal range: Santonian-Danian, ~85.8–64.5 Ma Late Cretaceous-Early Paleocene

Extinct genus of ammonite

Eubaculites is an extinct genus of cephalopods in the family Baculitidae and each known species was initially placed within the related genus Baculites until it was placed in a separate genus in 1926.

Eubaculites existed from the Turonian until the Danian, and is one of the very last genera of ammonites, going extinct roughly 64.5 million years ago, which was around 500,000 years after the start of the Cenozoic. Specimens found in the Maastricht Formation in The Netherlands suggest that at least one species (E. carinatus) survived the K-Pg mass extinction event, albeit being restricted to the Danian.
