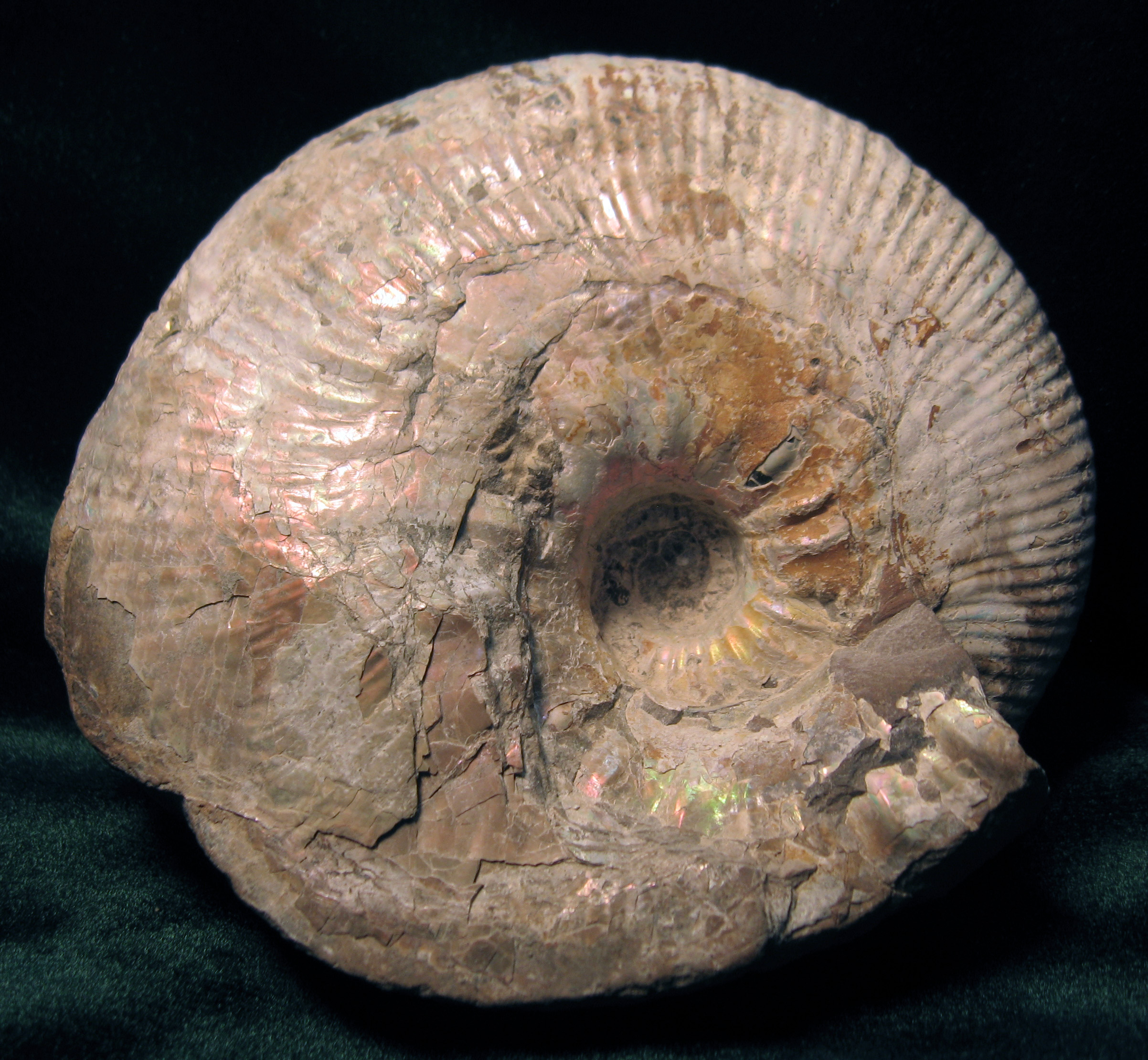
- Fossil of Rhaeboceras halli from the Upper Cretaceous period from the Bearpaw Shale Formation, Fergus County, Montana, United States

Scientific classification
- Kingdom: Animalia
- Phylum: Mollusca
- Class: Cephalopoda
- Subclass: †Ammonoidea
- Order: †Ammonitida
- Suborder: †Ancyloceratina
- Family: †Scaphitidae
- Subfamily: †Scaphitinae
- Genus: †Rhaeboceras; Meek 1876

Species
- †R. burkholderi Cobban, 1987; †R. cedarense Grier and Grier, 2015; †R. robustus Warren, 1934

= Rhaeboceras =

Rhaeboceras Temporal range: Cretaceous

Extinct genus of ammonite

Rhaeboceras is an extinct genus of ammonite belonging to the subfamily Scaphitinae. Species belonging to the genus lived during the Cretaceous and have been found in the Pierre Shale of North America.

== Taxonomy ==
There are currently three species belonging to this genus:

- Rhaeboceras burkholderi (Cobban, 1987)

- Rhaeboceras cedarense (Grier and Grier, 2015)

- Rhaeboceras robustus (Warren, 1934)

The genus Ponteixites is currently deemed a junior synonym of Rhaeboceras, with most specimens formerly assigned to Ponteixites appearing to be juveniles. The finding of a larger fossil specimen assigned to P. robustus similar to these juvenile remains provides evidence supporting this lumping.
