= Clioscaphites =

Clioscaphites Temporal range: Coniacian to Santonian ~84–90 Ma

Scientific classification
- Kingdom: Animalia
- Phylum: Mollusca
- Class: Cephalopoda
- Subclass: †Ammonoidea
- Order: †Ammonitida
- Suborder: †Ancyloceratina
- Family: †Scaphitidae
- Genus: †Clioscaphites; Cobban 2005

Species
- C. choteauensis C. montanensis C. saxitonianus C. vermiformis

Extinct genus of mollusc

Clioscaphites is an extinct genus of ammonite belonging to the family Scaphitidae. Species in this genus are important index fossils of the Western Interior Seaway of the Coniacian to Santonian Ages of the Cretaceous.
