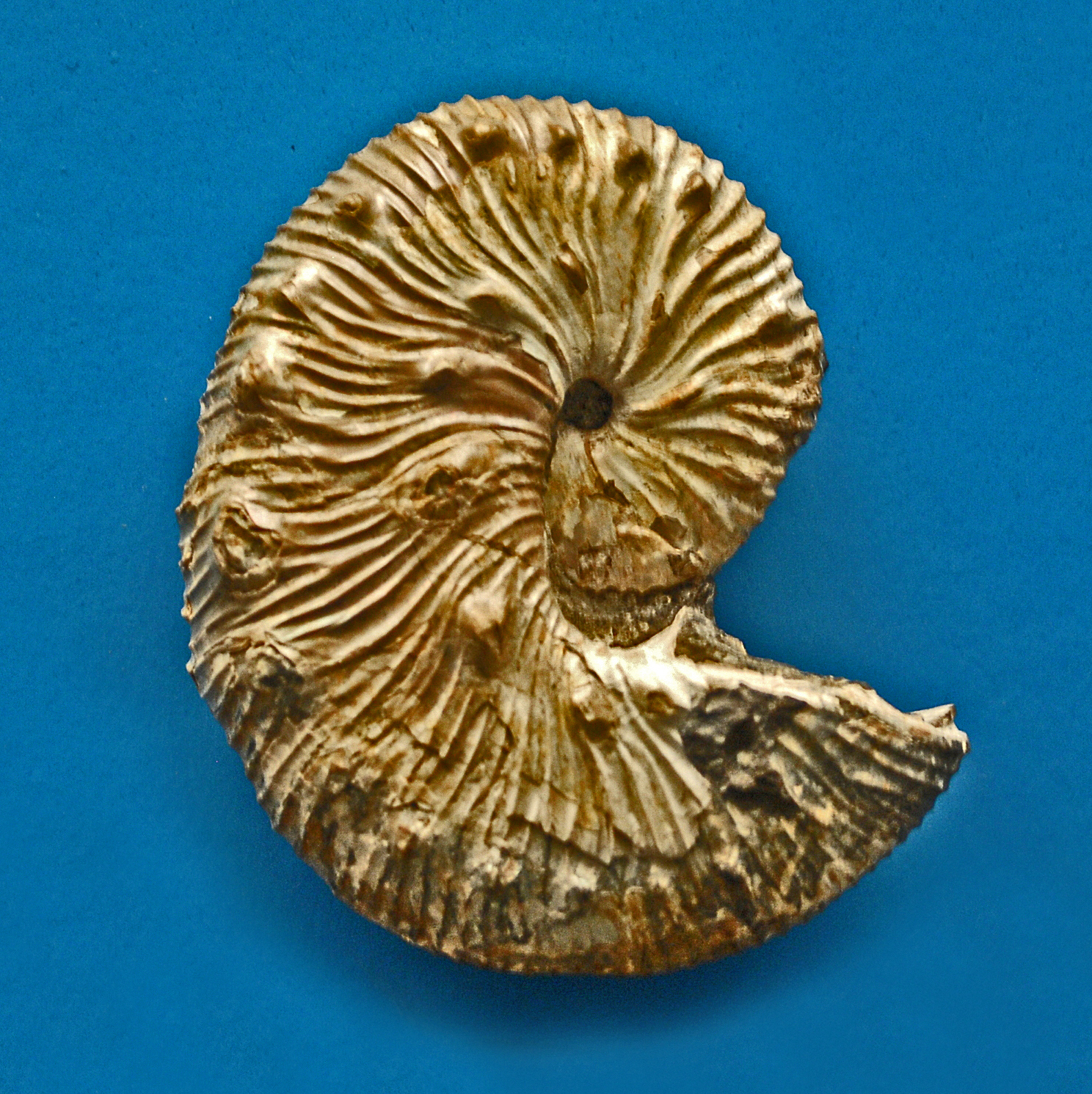
- Scaphites species fossil

Scientific classification
- Kingdom: Animalia
- Phylum: Mollusca
- Class: Cephalopoda
- Subclass: †Ammonoidea
- Order: †Ammonitida
- Suborder: †Ancyloceratina
- Superfamily: †Scaphitoidea; Gill, 1871
- Family: †Scaphitidae; Gill, 1871

Subfamilies
- See text

= Scaphitidae =

Scaphitidae Temporal range: Early Cretaceous-Early Paleocene, Albian–Danian Potential Danian survival of Hoploscaphites

Extinct family of ammonites

Scaphitidae is a family of extinct cephalopods belonging to the family of heteromorph ammonites (suborder Ancyloceratina). There is a possible fossil record of them being the last ammonites with fossils dating to the Danian of the Paleocene in Denmark, the Netherlands, the US and Turkmenistan.

== Genera ==
Scaphitidae Gill, 1871

- Subfamily Otoscaphitinae Wright, 1953
  - Yezoites Yabe, 1910
- Subfamily Scaphitinae Gill, 1871
  - Acanthoscaphites Nowak, 1911
  - Clioscaphites Cobban, 1951
  - Discoscaphites Meek, 1870
  - Eoscaphites Breistroffer, 1947
  - Hoploscaphites Nowak, 1911
  - Indoscaphites Spath, 1953
  - Jeletzkytes Riccardi, 1983
  - Ponteixites Warren, 1934
  - Rhaeboceras Meek, 1876
  - Scaphites Parkinson, 1811
  - Trachyscaphites Cobban & Scott, 1964
- Subfamily Incertae sedis
  - Worthoceras Adkins, 1928
