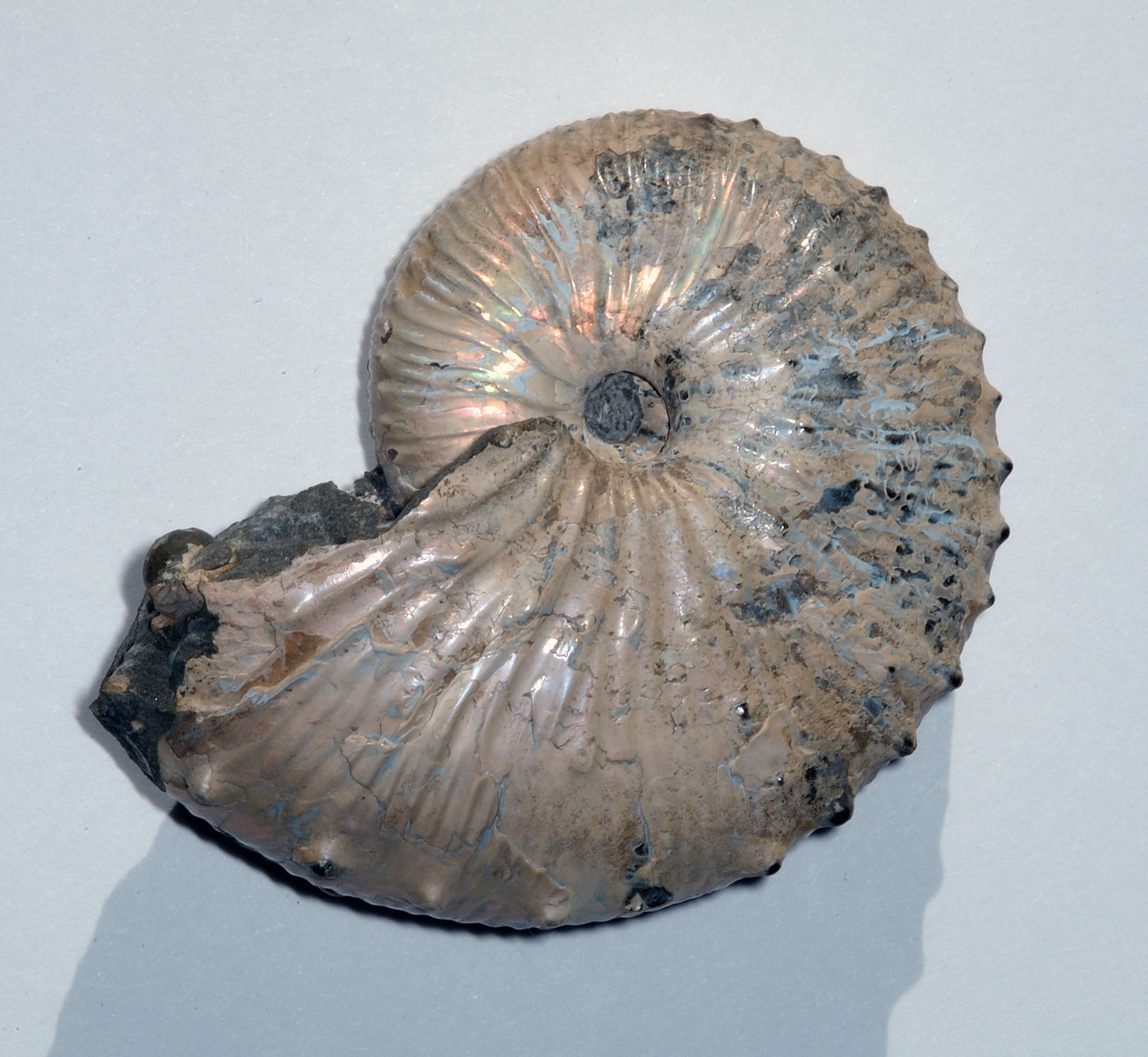
- Jeletzkytes, from the United States

Scientific classification
- Kingdom: Animalia
- Phylum: Mollusca
- Class: Cephalopoda
- Subclass: †Ammonoidea
- Order: †Ammonitida
- Suborder: †Ancyloceratina
- Family: †Scaphitidae
- Subfamily: †Scaphitinae
- Genus: †Jeletzkytes; Riccardi, 1983

Species
- see text

= Jeletzkytes =

Jeletzkytes Temporal range: Late Cretaceous (Maastrichtian)

Genus of molluscs (fossil)

Jeletzkytes is an extinct genus of scaphatoid ammonite from the Upper Cretaceous (Maastrichtian) of North America named and described by Riccardi, 1983. In overall form Jeletzkytes closely resembles the genus Scaphites.

A number of species have been described in the genus including:

- J. brevis
- J. compressus
- J. crassus
- J. criptonodosus
- J. dorfi
- J. furnivali
- J. nebrascensis
- J. nodosus
- J. spedeni
