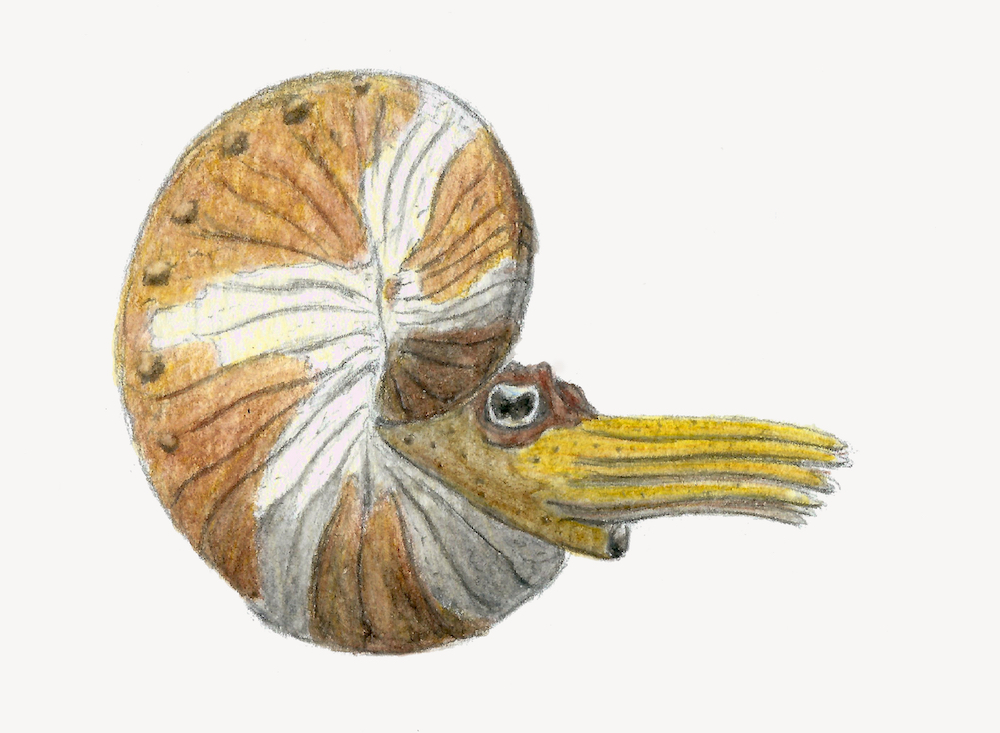
- Hoploscaphites; Pierre Shale. South Dakota

Scientific classification
- Kingdom: Animalia
- Phylum: Mollusca
- Class: Cephalopoda
- Subclass: †Ammonoidea
- Order: †Ammonitida
- Suborder: †Ancyloceratina
- Family: †Scaphitidae
- Subfamily: †Scaphitinae
- Genus: †Hoploscaphites; Nowak, 1911

Species
- See text

= Hoploscaphites =

Hoploscaphites Temporal range: Upper Cretaceous to Lower Paleocene

Genus of molluscs (fossil)

Hoploscaphites is an extinct ammonite genus from the Upper Cretaceous and the Lower Paleocene, included in the family Scaphitidae.

== Morphology ==
It is considered by some to be a subgenus of Scaphites. Like Scaphites, the shell of Hoploscaphites is involute with the final whorl projecting forward and curving back on itself. Shells vary from compressed to inflated with convex sides. Tubercles normally present may be sparse or absent.

== Distribution ==
Fossils of Hoploscaphites have been found in Antarctica, Austria, Belgium, Bulgaria, Canada (Alberta, Saskatchewan), Chile, Denmark, France, Germany, Greenland, India, the Netherlands, Turkmenistan, Ukraine and the United States (Arkansas, Colorado, Delaware, Kansas, New Jersey, New Mexico, North Dakota, South Dakota, Texas, Wyoming). Of the few genera of ammonites which are thought to have survived the K-Pg extinction event into the Danian period (65-61 Myr) of the Paleogene, Hoploscaphites is the most widely and reliably recorded, with finds in Denmark, the Netherlands and the United States, and a possible record in Turkmenistan.

== Species ==
A number of species have been described in the genus:

- H. angmartussutensis Birkelund, 1965
- H. birkelundae Landman & Waage, 1993
- H. crassus (Coryell & Salmon), 1934
- H. comprimus (Owen, 1852)
- H. constrictus (Sowerby, 1817)
- H. criptonodosus Riccardi, (1983)
- H. indicus (Forbes, 1846)
- H. landesi Riccardi, 1983
- H. melloi Landman & Waage, 1993
- H. nicolletii (Morton, 1842)
- H. pumilis Stephenson, 1941
- H. quiriquinensis Wilckens, 1904
- H. tenuistriatus (Kner, 1848)
- H. vistulensis Blaszkiewicz, 1980
- H. youngi Larson, 2016
