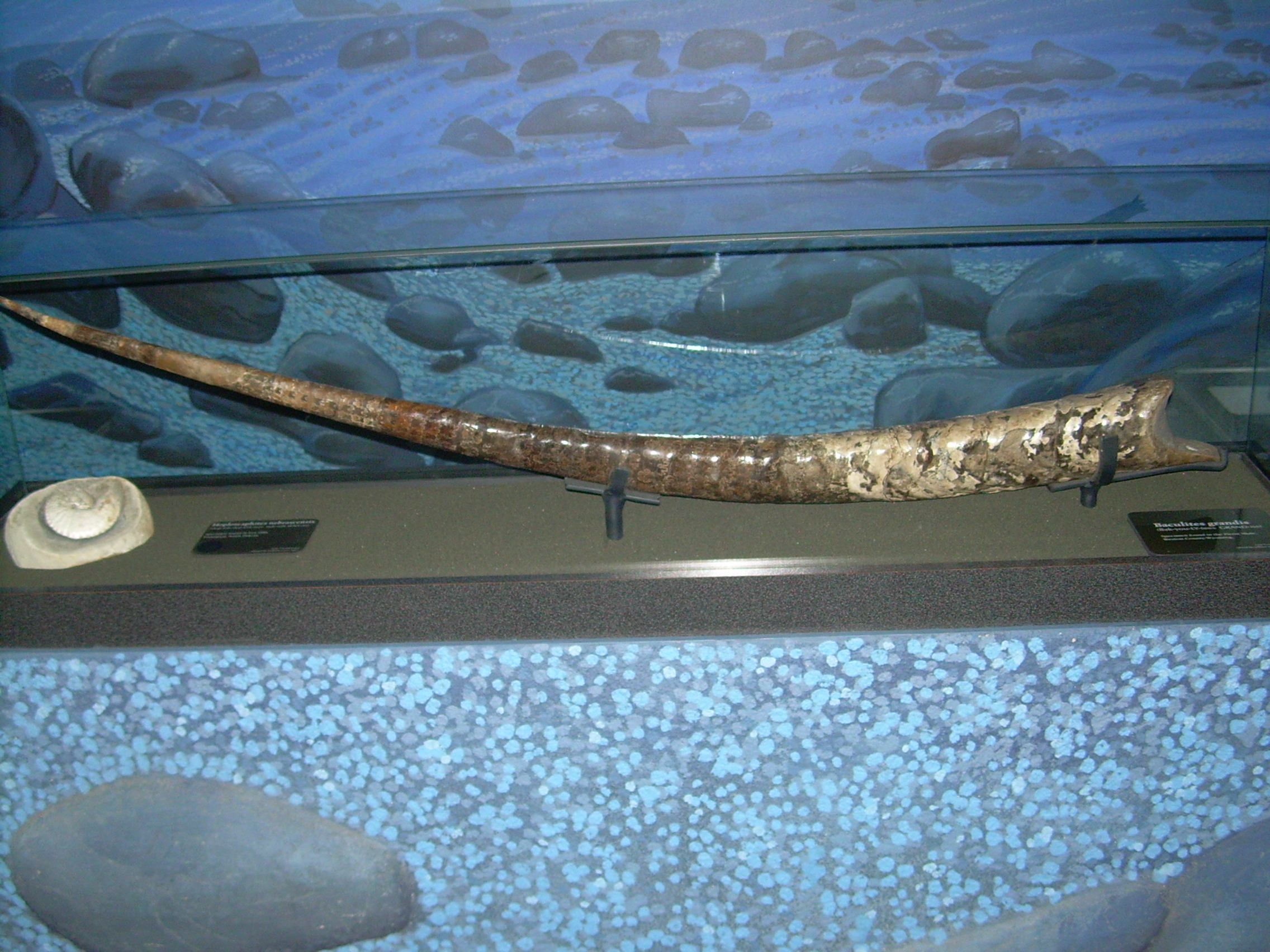
- Fossil cast of a Baculites shell in the North American Museum of Ancient Life.

Scientific classification
- Domain: Eukaryota
- Kingdom: Animalia
- Phylum: Mollusca
- Class: Cephalopoda
- Subclass: †Ammonoidea
- Order: †Ammonitida
- Suborder: †Ancyloceratina
- Superfamily: †Turrilitoidea
- Family: †Baculitidae; Gill, 1871

Type genus
- Baculites Lamarck, 1799

Genera
- See text

= Baculitidae =

Baculitidae Temporal range: Albian to Danian

Extinct family of molluscs

Baculitidae is a family of extinct ammonoid cephalopods that lived mostly during the Late Cretaceous, and often included in the suborder Ancyloceratina.

Baculitid genera are characterized by a small to minute initial coil of about two whorls followed by a long straight or slightly curved shaft. Genera are distinguished on the basis of size, general shape, particulars of the suture, and ornamentation. They can reach lengths of 120 cm (47 in) or more.

Baculitids are found worldwide in deposits from the upper Albian to the Danian ages. Related families are the Anisoceratidae, Diplomoceratidae, Hamitidae, Nostoceratidae, and Turrilitidae; all of which along with the Baculitidae are included in the superfamily Turrilitoidea.

Genera included in the family:

- Baculites
- Boehmoceras
- Eubaculites
- Fresvillia
- Lechites
- Pseudobaculites
- Sciponoceras
- Trachybaculites
- Tuberosciponoceras
