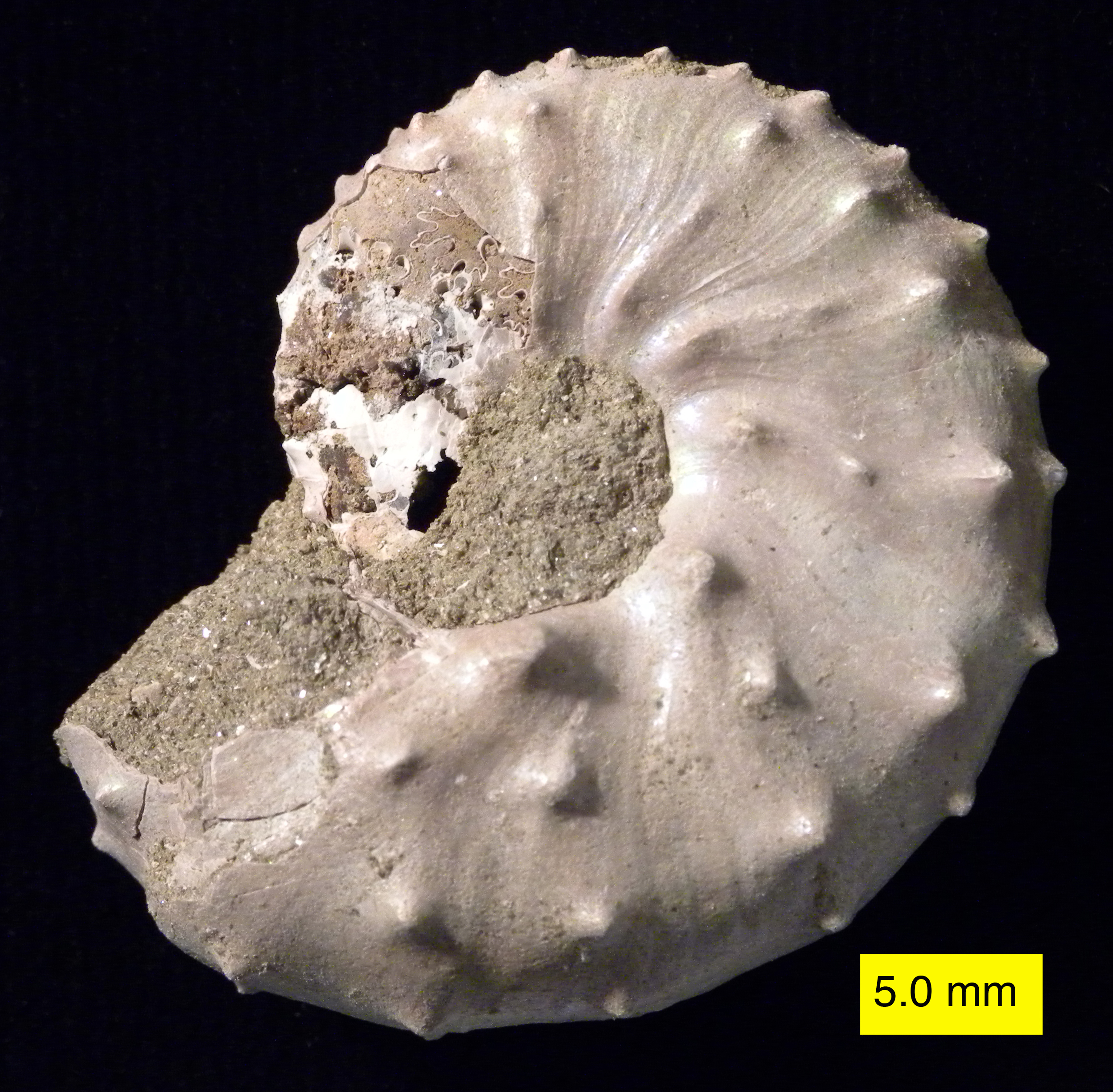
- Discoscaphites iris, Owl Creek Formation (Upper Cretaceous), Ripley, Mississippi.

Scientific classification
- Kingdom: Animalia
- Phylum: Mollusca
- Class: Cephalopoda
- Subclass: †Ammonoidea
- Order: †Ammonitida
- Suborder: †Ancyloceratina
- Family: †Scaphitidae
- Subfamily: †Scaphitinae
- Genus: †Discoscaphites; Meek, 1870

Species
- D. conradi; D. gulosus; D. rossi

= Discoscaphites =

Discoscaphites Temporal range: Campanian to Danian

Genus of molluscs (fossil)

Discoscaphites is an extinct genus of ammonite. This genus may have been one of the few to have briefly survived the K-Pg mass extinction.

== Distributions ==
Cretaceous of Greenland, Alabama, Arkansas, California, Colorado, Kansas, Maryland, Mississippi, Missouri, New Jersey, South Dakota, Tennessee, Texas, Wyoming, and North Carolina. Discoscaphites is present in the famous Pinna Layer of the Tinton Formation of New Jersey (above the iridium anomaly), with even possible records in the layer above, along with Eubaculites. Some researchers prefer a conservative interpretation when dating the Pinna Layer, the other remains still suggest Discoscaphites was a K-Pg survivor, albeit restricted to 65 Ma.
