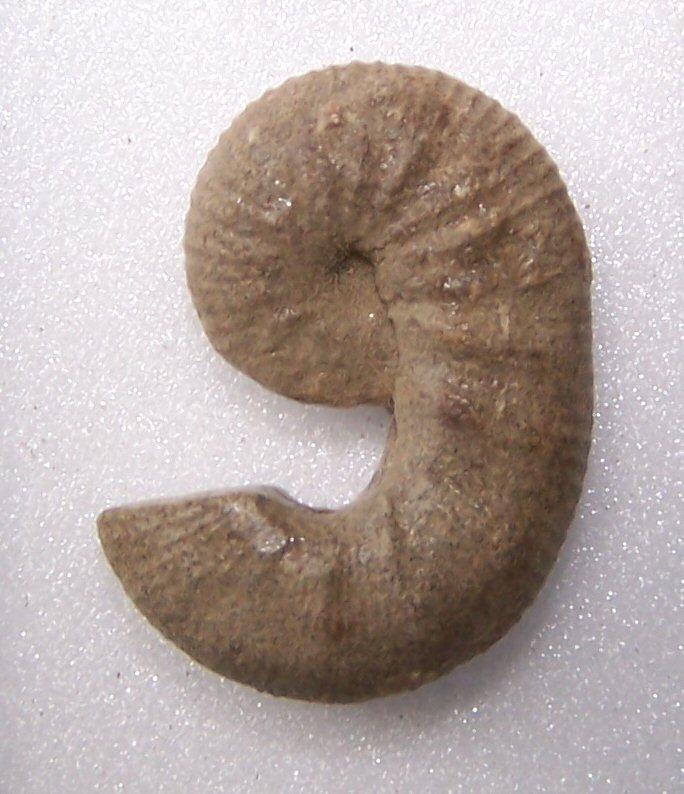
- Scaphites sp. from Colorado; Specimen is 2.8 centimetres (1.1 in) from top to bottom

Scientific classification
- Domain: Eukaryota
- Kingdom: Animalia
- Phylum: Mollusca
- Class: Cephalopoda
- Subclass: †Ammonoidea
- Order: †Ammonitida
- Suborder: †Ancyloceratina
- Family: †Scaphitidae
- Subfamily: †Scaphitinae
- Genus: †Scaphites; Parkinson, 1811

Species
- See text

= Scaphites =

Scaphites Temporal range: Cretaceous, 105–66 Ma

Genus of mollusks (fossil)

Scaphites is a genus of heteromorph ammonites belonging to the Scaphitidae family. They were a widespread genus that thrived during the Late Cretaceous period.

== Morphology ==
Scaphites generally have a chambered, boat-shaped shell. The initial part (juvenile stage) of the shell is generally more or less involute (tightly coiled) and compressed, giving no hint of the heteromorphic shell form yet to come. The terminal part (adult stage) is much shorter, erect, and bends over the older shell like a hook. They have transverse, branching ribs with tubercles (small bumps) along the venter.

Suture pattern of Scaphites

Reconstructions of the body within the shell can be made to portray Scaphites as either a benthic (bottom-dwelling) or planktonic animal, depending on where the center of gravity is located. Since useful fossils of the soft-body parts of cephalopods are highly rare, little is known about how this animal actually fit into its shell and lived its life.

== Age ==
Because Scaphites and its relatives in the superfamily Scaphitoidea are restricted to certain ages of the Cretaceous (ca. 144 to 66.4 million years ago), they are useful in some areas as an index fossil. A notable example is the Late Cretaceous Western Interior Seaway in North America, in which several endemic lineages of scaphite species evolved and now serve as the basis for a highly resolved regional biostratigraphy.

== Species ==
- Scaphites aequalis † J. Sowerby, 1813
- Scaphites binneyi † Reeside, 1927
- Scaphites carlilensis † Morrow, 1935
- Scaphites depressus † Reeside, 1927
- Scaphites ferronensis † Cobban, 1951
- Scaphites frontierensis † Cobban, 1951
- Scaphites hippocrepis † DeKay, 1827
- Scaphites impendicostatus † Cobban, 1951
- Scaphites leei † Reeside, 1927
- Scaphites nanus † Reeside, 1927
- Scaphites nodosus †
- Scaphites obliquus † J. Sowerby, 1813
- Scaphites preventricosus † Cobban, 1951
- Scaphites tetonensis † Cobban, 1951
- Scaphites uintensis † Cobban, 1951
- Scaphites warreni † Meek and Hayden, 1860
- Scaphites whitfieldi † Cobban, 1951

== Distribution ==
Fossils of Scaphites have been found in Antarctica, Armenia, Australia, Belgium, Bulgaria, Canada (Alberta, British Columbia, Northwest Territories), Denmark, France, Germany, Greenland, India, Italy, Japan, Madagascar, Mexico, New Zealand, South Africa, Spain, Sweden, Switzerland, Ukraine, the United Kingdom, and the United States (Alabama, Alaska, Arizona, California, Colorado, Delaware, Kansas, Maryland, Minnesota, Mississippi, Missouri, Montana, Nebraska, New Jersey, New Mexico, North Dakota, Oregon, South Dakota, Tennessee, Texas, Wyoming).
