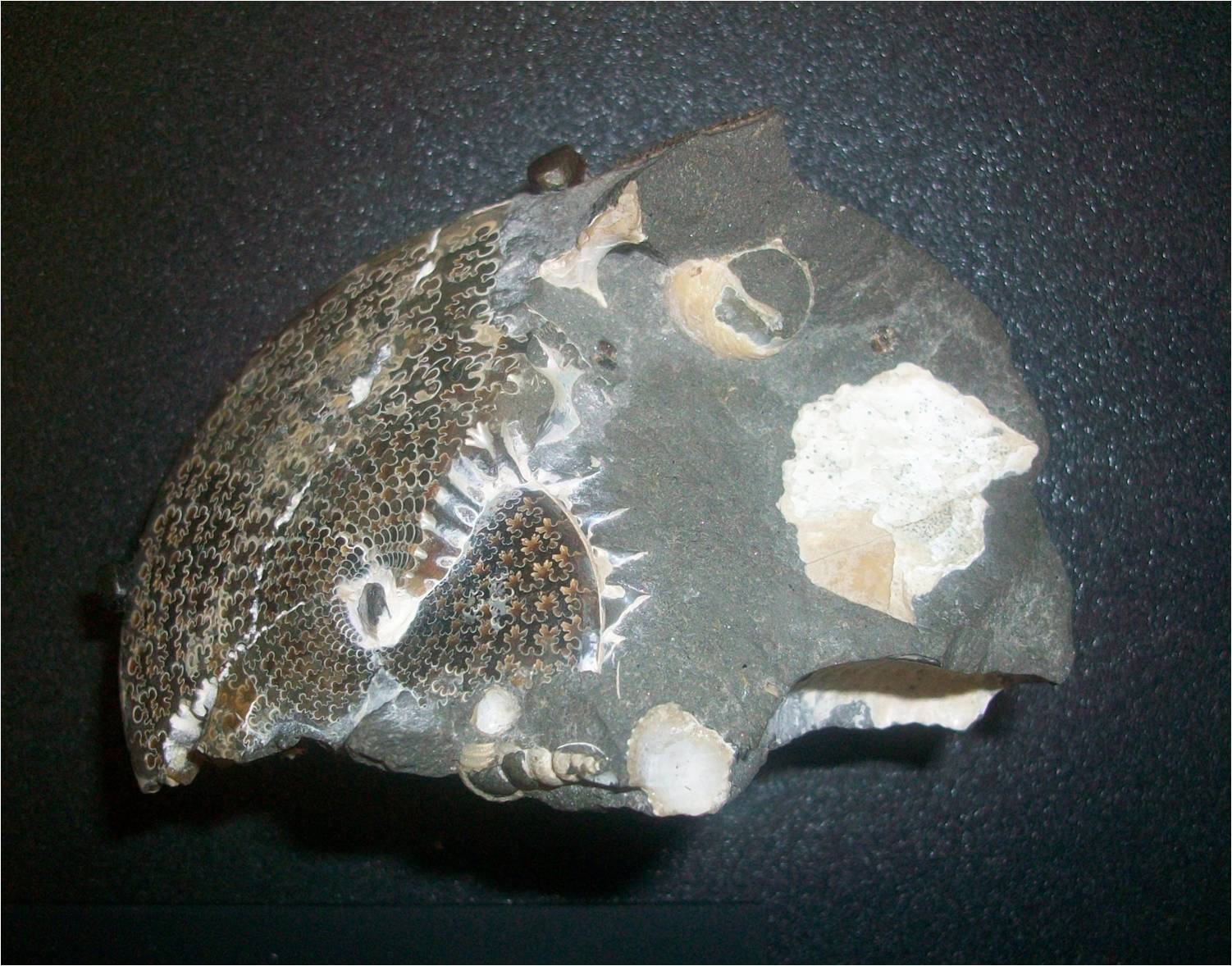
- Sphenodiscus lenticularis

Scientific classification
- Domain: Eukaryota
- Kingdom: Animalia
- Phylum: Mollusca
- Class: Cephalopoda
- Subclass: †Ammonoidea
- Order: †Ammonitida
- Family: †Sphenodiscidae
- Genus: †Sphenodiscus; Meek, 1871

Species
- S. lobatus (Tuomey, 1854 [originally Ammonites lobatus]); S. lenticularis (Owen, 1852 [originally Ammonites lenticularis]); S. pleurisepta (Conrad, 1857 [originally Ammonites pleurisepta]); S. brasiliensis Maury, 1930; S. binkhorsti Böhm, 1898; S. intermedius Böse, 1927; S. aberrans Böse, 1927; S. parahybensis Maury, 1930; S. prepleurisepta Böse, 1927; S. ubaghsi de Groussouvre, 1894; S. siva Kennedy & Henderson, 1992

= Sphenodiscus =

Sphenodiscus Temporal range: early Campanian-early Danian ~83.5–64.5 Ma

Genus of molluscs (fossil)

Sphenodiscus is an extinct genus of acanthoceratacean ammonite. The genus has been found from many continents and is thought to have had a large global distribution during the Maastrichtian stage of the Late Cretaceous. It was one of the last ammonoids to have evolved before the entire subclass became extinct during the Paleocene, which was directly after the Cretaceous–Paleogene extinction event.

== Distribution ==
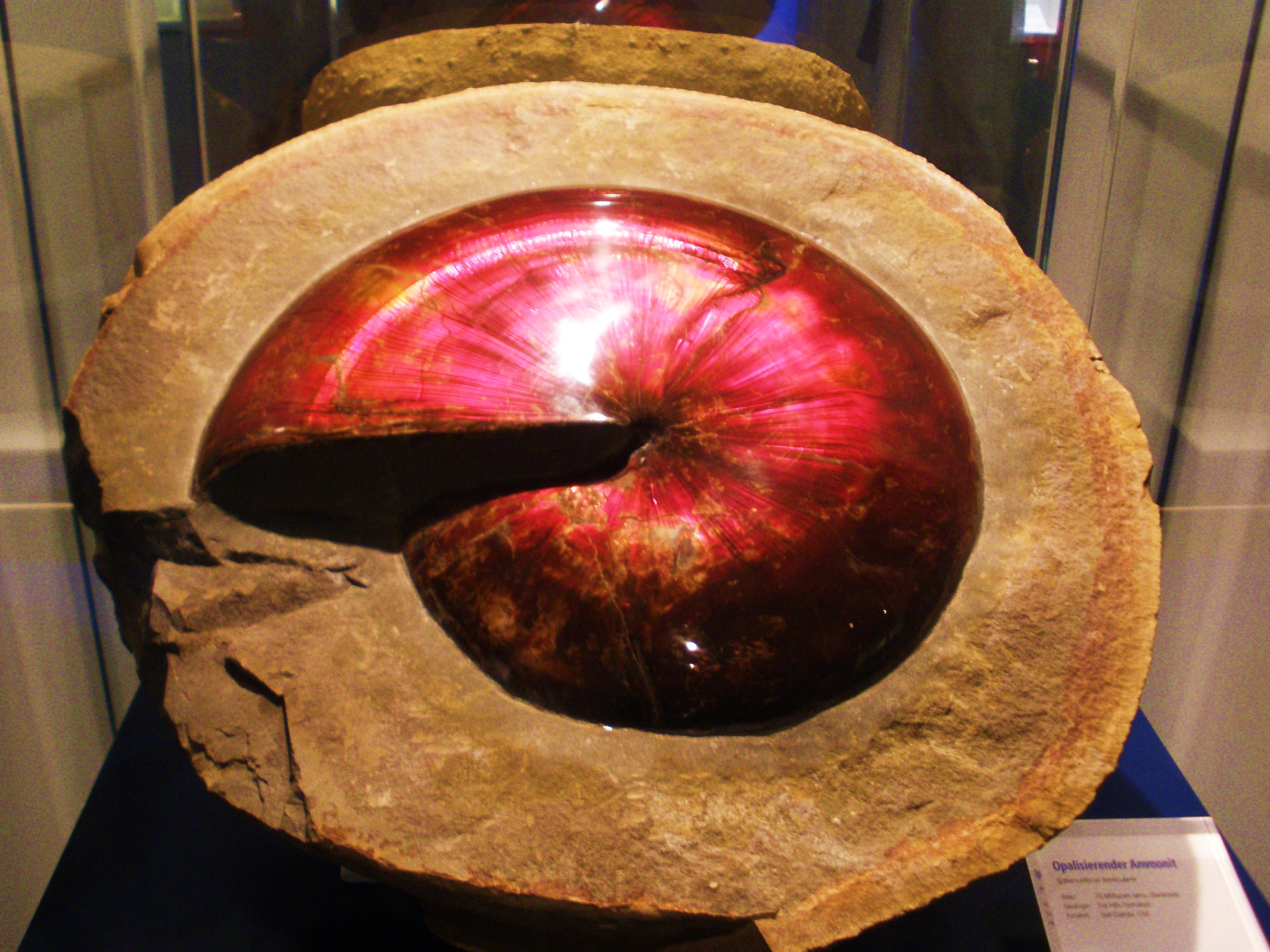
Nacreous specimen

Fossils have been found throughout North America from localities in South Carolina, North Carolina, South Dakota, Maryland, New Jersey and Mexico. There is also evidence of the genus being present from the island of Trinidad, although the material found from here cannot be classified at the species level. Common species found in North America include S. lobatus, S. lenticularis, and S. pleurisepta. New species have been found from localities outside of North America such as S. binkhorsti from the Maastricht Formation in the Netherlands, S. siva from the Valudavur Formation in India and S. brasiliensis from the beds along the banks of the Rio Gramame in Brazil. Many specimens of S. lobatus have also been found from the Nkporo Shale in Nigeria.

== Description ==
Suture pattern of Sphenodiscus

The shell of Sphenodiscus was streamlined and lateromedially compressed with overlapping whorls and a small umbilicus. The ventral edge of the shell tends to be sharply angled. The outer surface is generally smooth in fossil specimens, although certain species at different stages of ontogenic development may possess many small tubercles along their surfaces. Sphenodiscus had a complex suture pattern with many small branching lobes and saddles.
