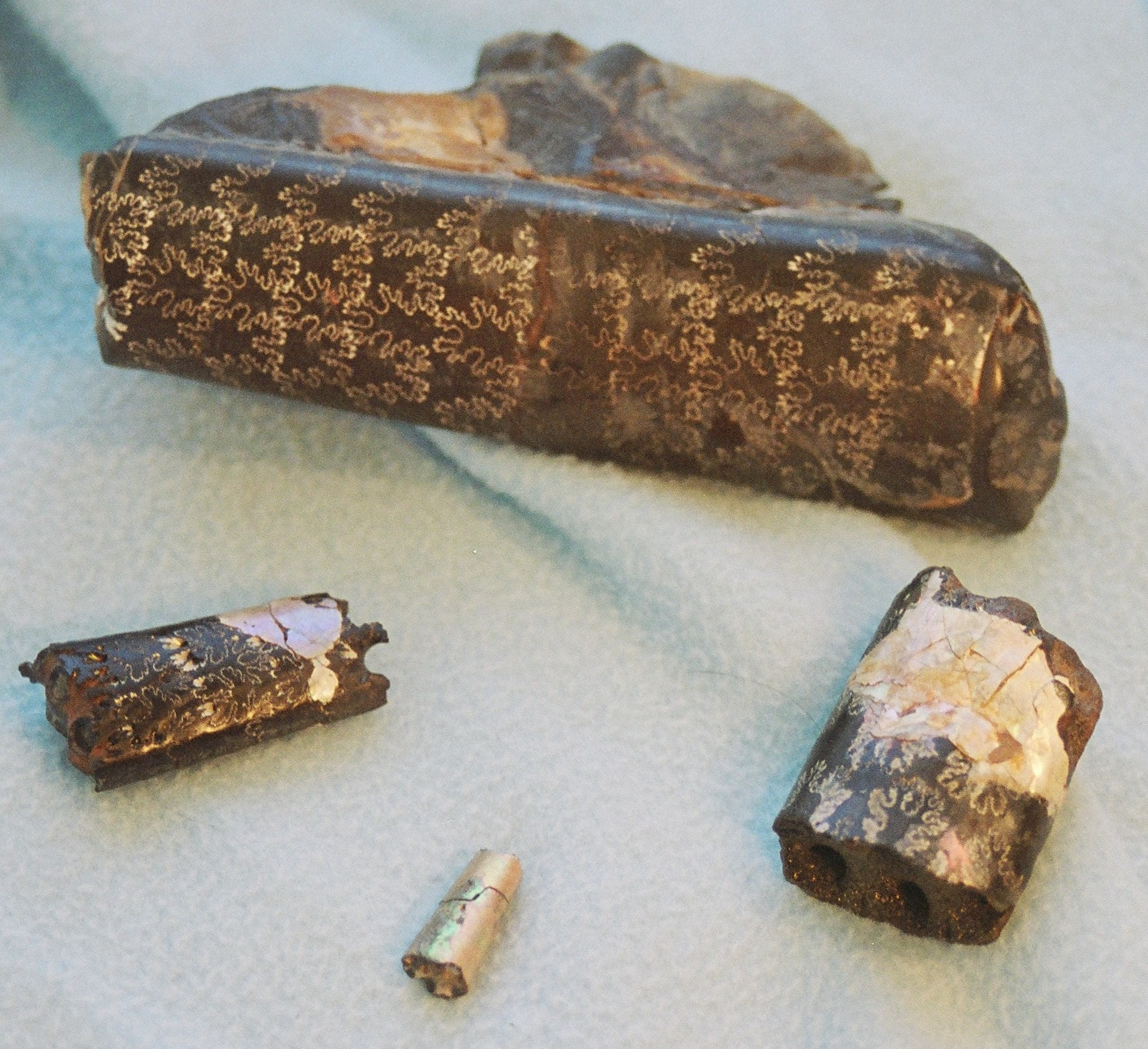
- Baculites fossils from South Dakota. Some still have traces of the original nacre (shells).

Scientific classification
- Kingdom: Animalia
- Phylum: Mollusca
- Class: Cephalopoda
- Subclass: †Ammonoidea
- Order: †Ammonitida
- Suborder: †Ancyloceratina
- Family: †Baculitidae
- Genus: †Baculites; Lamarck, 1799

Type species
- †Baculites vertebralis Lamarck, 1801 vide Meek, 1876

Species
- See text

= Baculites =

Baculites Temporal range: 96–65 Ma Upper Cretaceous to Lower Paleocene

Genus of molluscs (fossil)

Baculites is an extinct genus of heteromorph ammonite cephalopods with almost straight shells. The genus, which lived worldwide throughout most of the Late Cretaceous, and which briefly survived the K-Pg mass extinction event, was named by Lamarck in 1799.

== Shell anatomy ==
The adult shell of Baculites is generally straight and may be either smooth or with sinuous striae or ribbing that typically slant dorso-ventrally forward. The aperture likewise slopes to the front and has a sinuous margin. The venter is narrowly rounded to acute while the dorsum is more broad. The juvenile shell, found at the apex, is coiled in one or two whorls and described as minute, about 1 centimetre (0.39 in) in diameter. Adult Baculites ranged in size from about 7 centimetres (2.8 in) (Baculites larsoni) up to 2 metres (6.6 ft) in length.

As with other ammonites, the shell consisted of a series of camerae, or chambers, that were connected to the animal by a narrow tube called a siphuncle by which gas content and thereby buoyancy could be regulated in the same manner as Nautilus does today. The chambers are separated by walls called septa. The line where each septum meets the outer shell is called the suture or suture line. Like other true ammonites, Baculites have intricate suture patterns on their shells that can be used to identify different species.

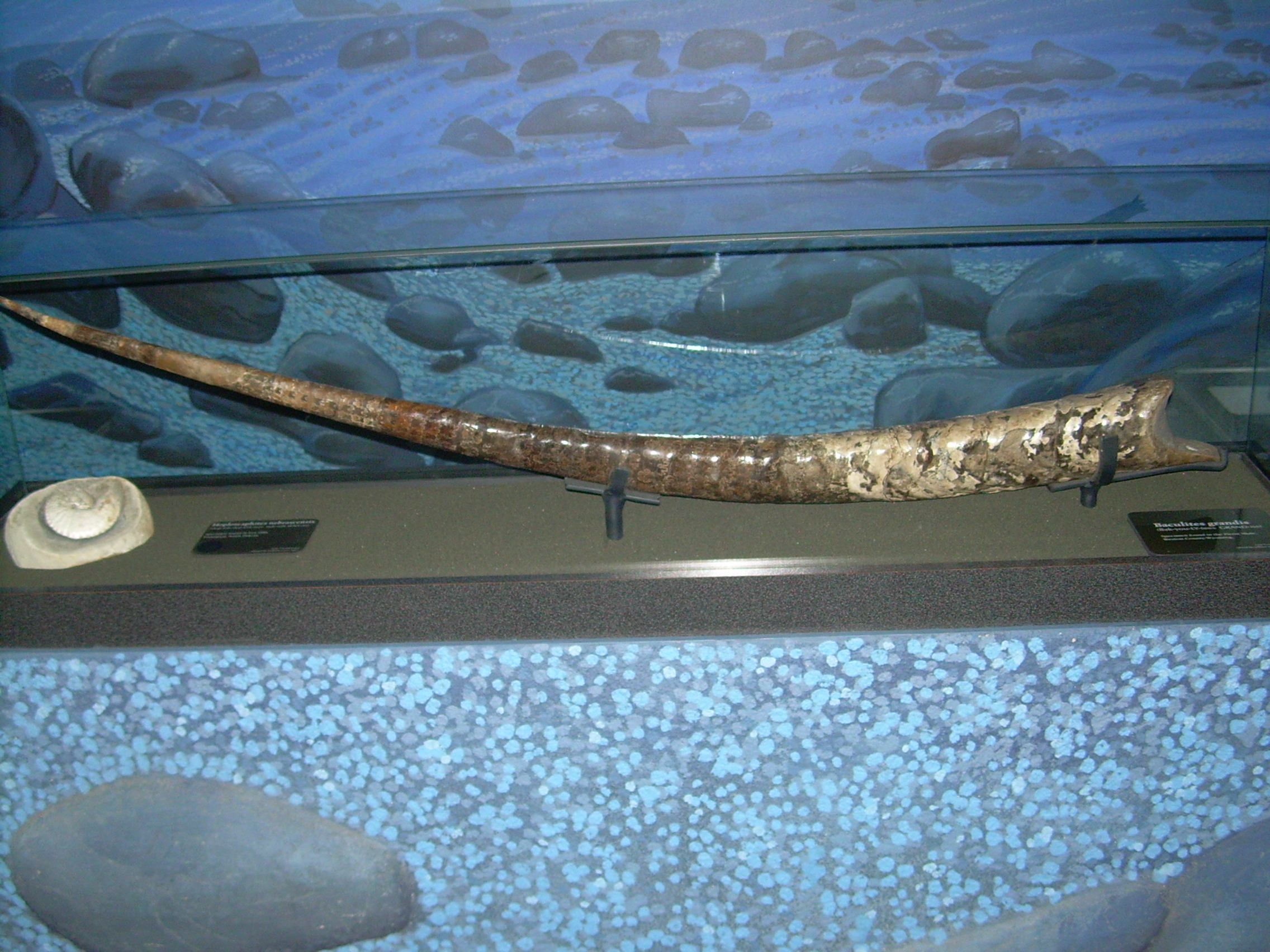
A fossil cast of the shell of a Baculites grandis on display at the North American Museum of Ancient Life in Lehi, Utah.

One notable feature about Baculites is that the males may have been a third to a half the size of the females and may have had much lighter ribbing on the surface of the shell.

== Orientation ==
The shell morphology of Baculites with slanted striations or ribbing, similarly slanted aperture, and more narrowly rounded to acute keel-like venter points to its having had a horizontal orientation in life as an adult. This same type of cross section is found in much earlier nautiloids such as Bassleroceras and Clitendoceras from the Ordovician period, which can be shown to have had a horizontal orientation. In spite of this, some researchers have concluded that Baculites lived in a vertical orientation, head hanging straight down, since lacking an apical counterweight, movement was largely restricted to that direction. More recent research, notably by Gerd Westermann, has reaffirmed that at least some Baculites species in fact lived in a more or less horizontal orientation.

== Ecology ==
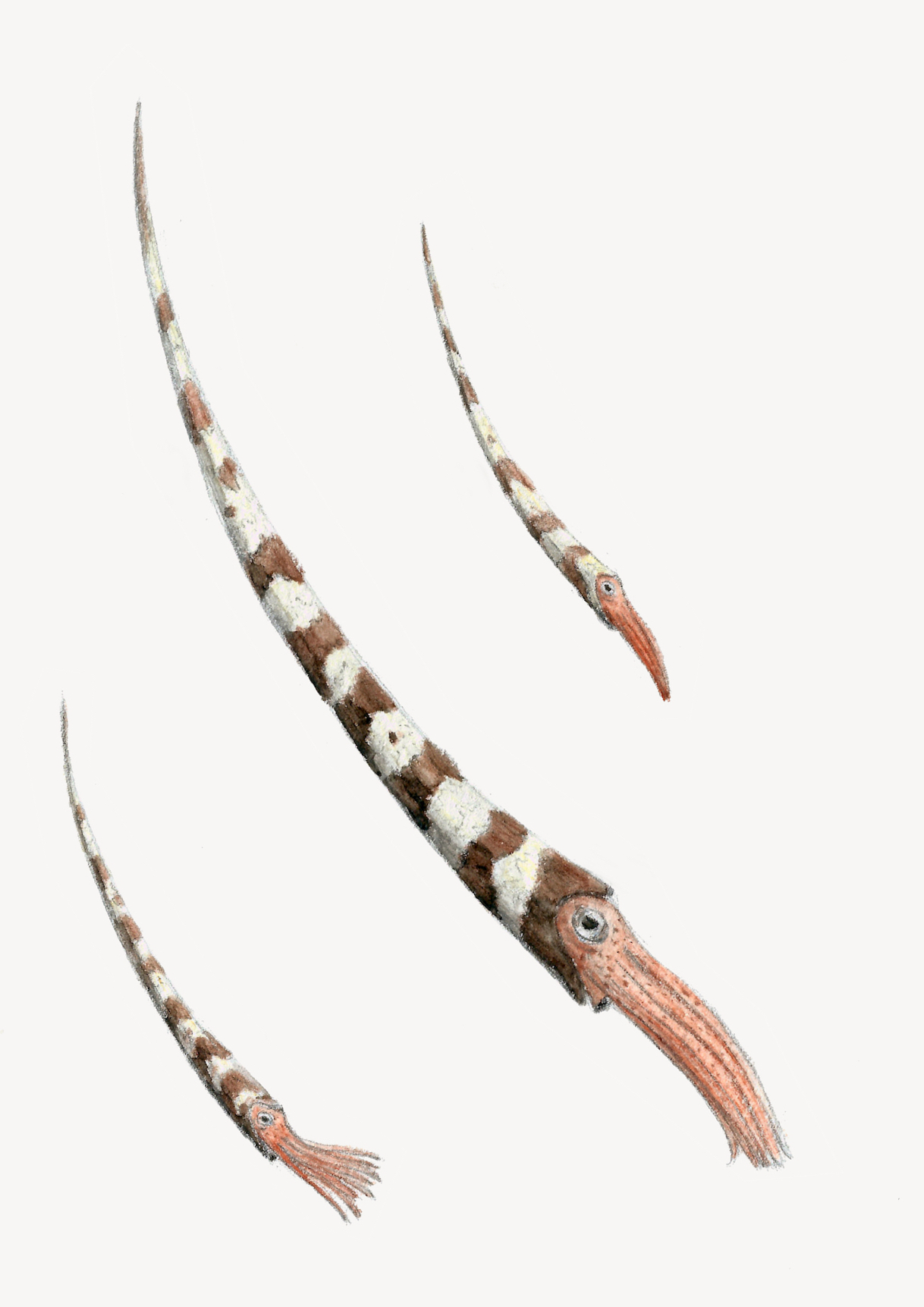
Life restoration of three Baculites vertebralis

From shell isotope studies, it is thought that Baculites inhabited the middle part of the water column, not too close to either the bottom or surface of the ocean. In some rock deposits Baculites are common, and they are thought to have lived in great shoals. However, they are not known to occur so densely as to be rock-forming, as do certain other extinct, straight-shelled cephalopods (e.g., orthocerid nautiloids). Studies on exceptionally preserved specimens have revealed a radula by synchrotron imagery. The results suggest that Baculites fed on pelagic zooplankton (as suggested by remains of a larval gastropod and a pelagic isopod inside the mouth).

== Convergent evolution ==
Baculites and related Cretaceous straight ammonite cephalopods are often confused with the superficially similar orthocerid nautiloid cephalopods. Both are long and tubular in form, and both are common items for sale in rock shops (often under each other's names). Both lineages evidently evolved the tubular form independently, and at different times in earth history. The orthocerid nautiloids mostly lived much earlier (common during the Paleozoic Era, possibly going extinct in the Early Cretaceous) than Baculites (Late Cretaceous-Danian only). The two types of fossils can be distinguished by many features, most obvious among which is the suture line: it is simple in orthocerid nautiloids and intricately folded in Baculites and related ammonoids.

== Species distribution ==
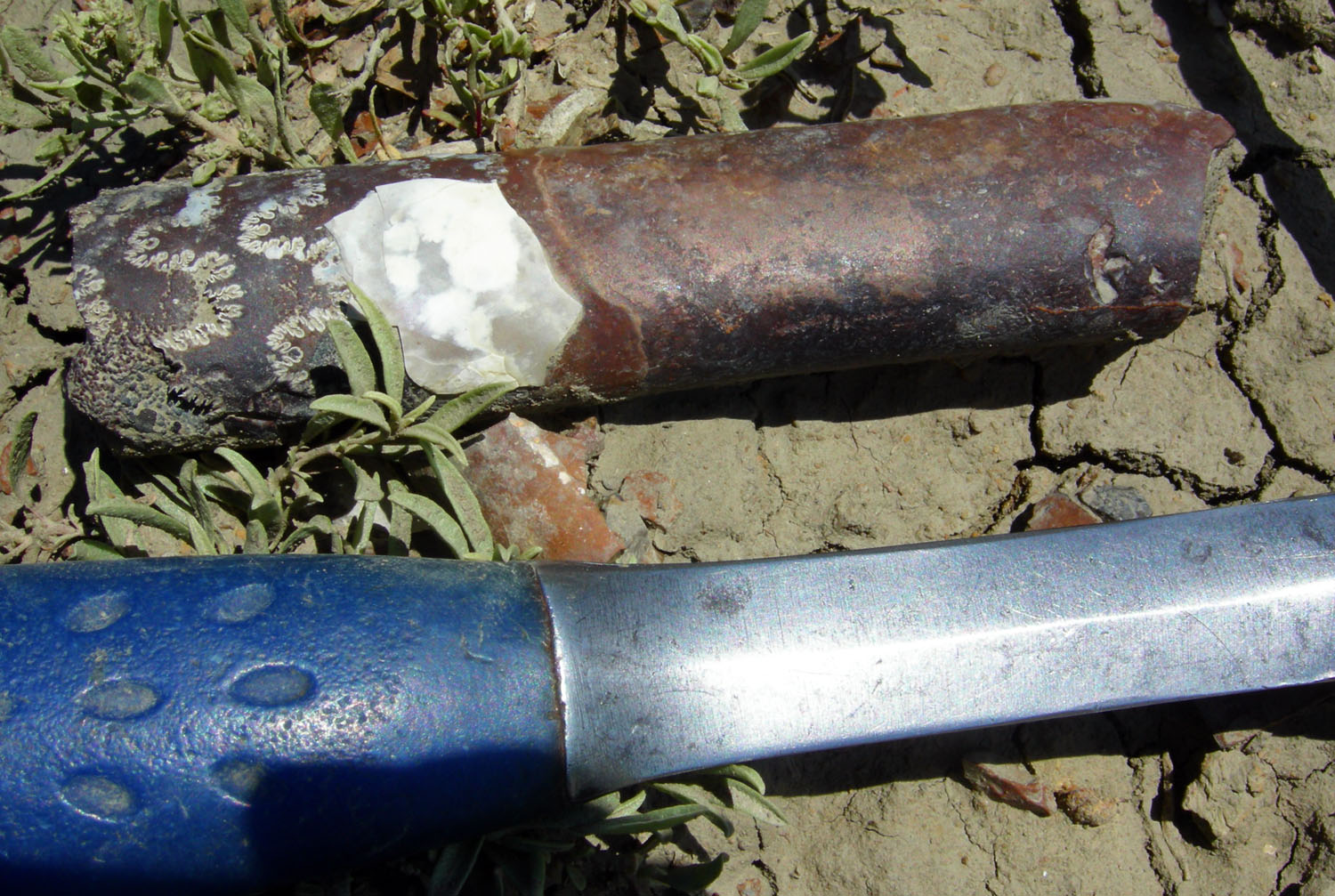
Baculites specimen in the field; western South Dakota, Pierre Shale, Late Cretaceous. Part of the phragmocone (left) and part of the body chamber (right) are present.

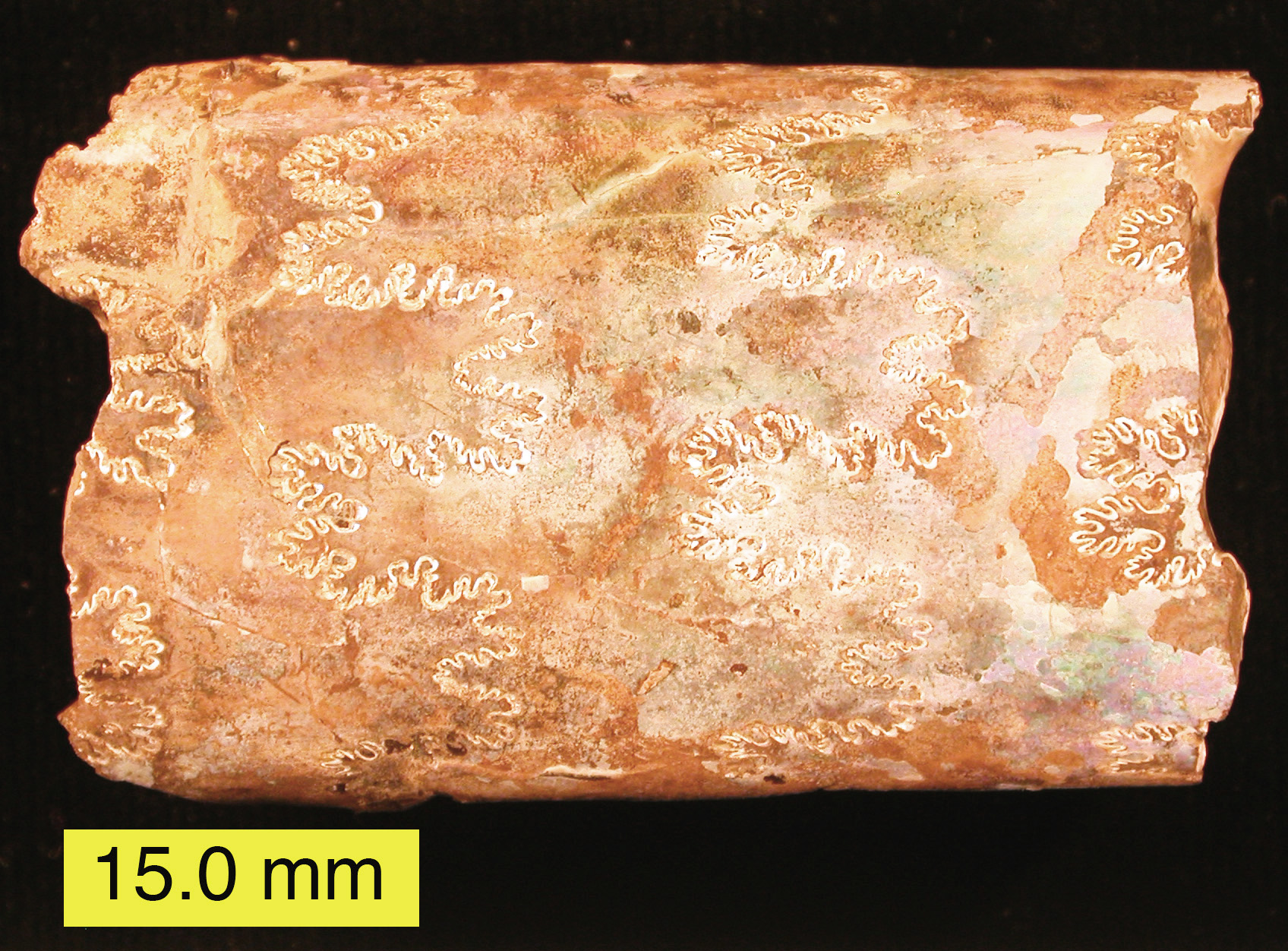
Baculites showing sutures and remnant aragonite; western South Dakota, Late Cretaceous.

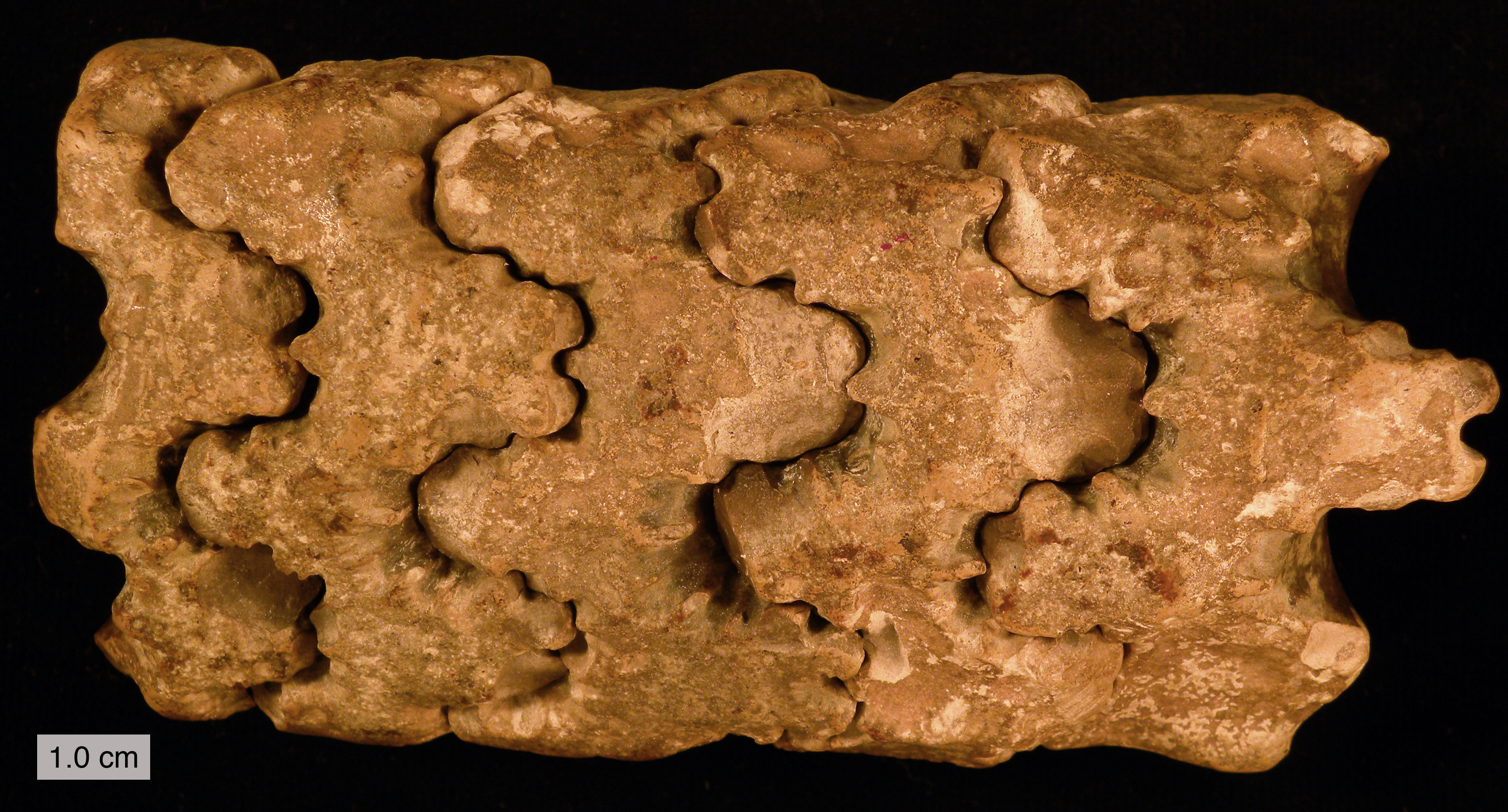
Baculites from the Late Cretaceous of Wyoming. The original aragonite of the outer conch and inner septa has dissolved away, leaving this articulated internal mold.

Cenomanian:

Baculites gracilis is known from the Cenomanian Britton Formation.

Turonian:

Baculites undulatus, from the upper Turonian of Europe.

Campanian:

The lower part of the Campanian stage (Upper Cretaceous) in the Western Interior of North America has yielded Baculites gilberti, early B. perplexus, B. asperiformis, B. maclearni, and B. obtusus, followed temporally by late Baculites perplexus and then by Baculites scotti. The upper part of the upper Campanian has yielded, from older to younger, B. compressus, B. coneatus, B. reesidei. B. jenseni, and B. ellasi, followed sequentially in the lower Maastrictian by Baculites baculus, B. grandis, and B. clinolobatis.

Baculites pacificum is known from the Campanian of Vancouver Island, British Columbia, and Baculites leopoliensis from the Upper Campanian of Europe.

Maastrichtian/Danian:

The type species, Baculites vertebralis is from the upper Maastrichtian and Danian, and is one of the very last species of ammonites. Findings in Denmark and the Netherlands suggest the species survived the K-Pg mass extinction event, albeit being restricted to the Danian. Baculites anceps is also known from Europe, although only from the Upper Maastrichtian.

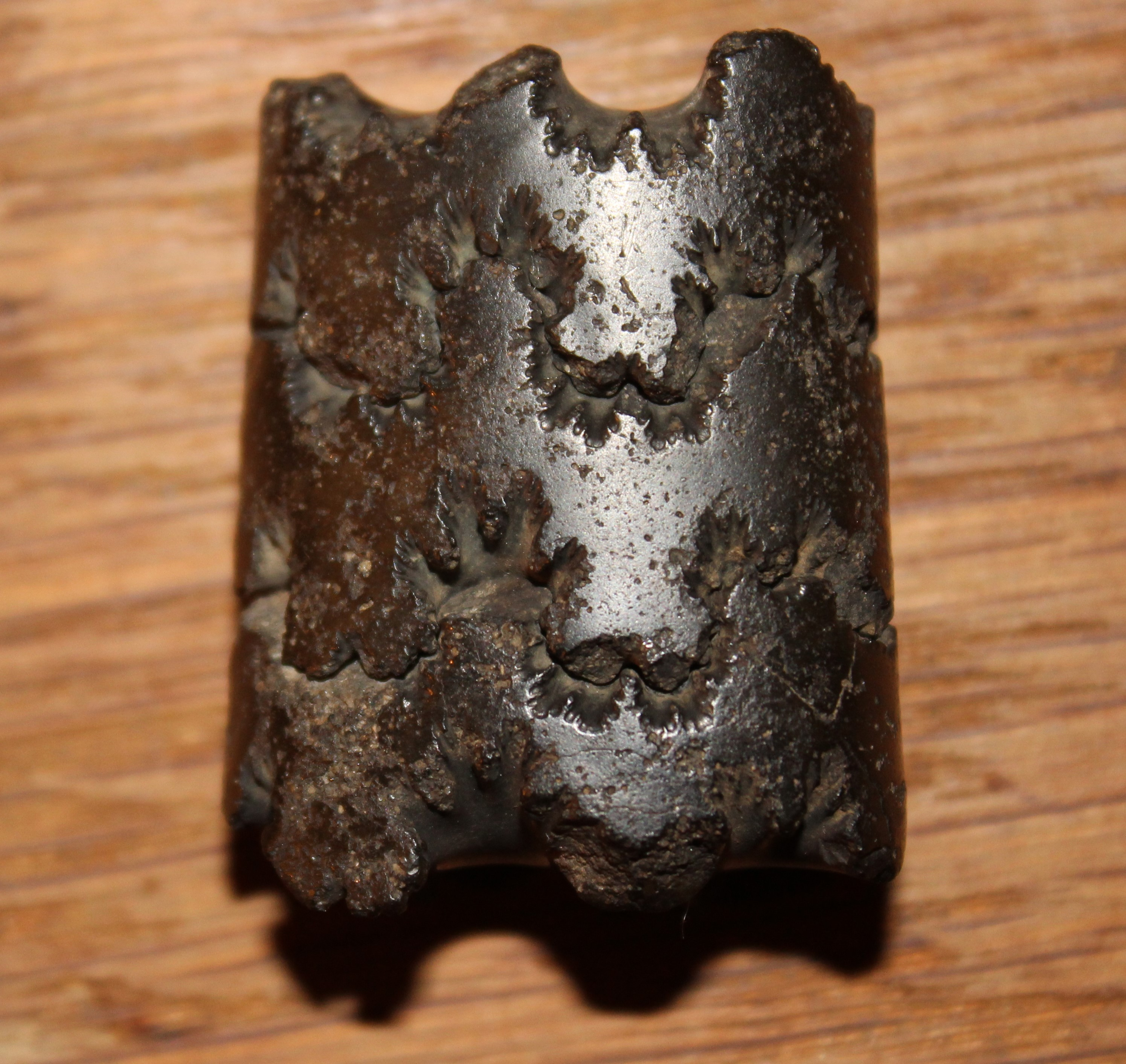
Holotype of Baculites ovatus Say, 1820 from the Navesink Formation in Atlantic Highlands, New Jersey.

Baculites ovatus is known from the Maastrichtian deposits of Ripley Formation in McNairy County, Tennessee, and Severn Formation in Prince George's County, Maryland.

== Cultural significance ==
Baculites fossils are very brittle and almost always break. They are most commonly found broken in half or several pieces, usually along suture lines. Individual chambers found this way are sometimes referred to as "stone buffaloes" (due to their shapes), though the Native-American attribution typically given as part of the story behind the name is likely apocryphal. The Blackfoot have oral traditions that tell a story of the Iniskimm (Buffalo Calling Stone). They are still in use today by Indigenous peoples.

Baculites ovatus, the first species of Baculites described in the Americas, was described by Thomas Say in 1820 from a single specimen from the Navesink Formation in Atlantic Highlands, New Jersey. The specimen was later illustrated by Samuel George Morton, who published an etching in 1828. After the death of the specimen's owner, the Quaker scientist Reuben Haines III, in 1831, the specimen was lost for 180 years until it was rediscovered at Haines's home, the historic Wyck House, in 2017 by Matthew Halley.
