= 2014 in paleoentomology =

This paleoentomology list records new fossil insect taxa that were described during the year 2014, as well as notes other significant paleoentomology discoveries and events which occurred during that year.

== Clade Amphiesmenoptera ==
=== Trichoptera ===
Name	Novelty	Status	Authors	Age	Unit	Location	Notes	Images
Acisarcuatus	Gen. et sp. nov	Valid	Liu et al.	Middle Jurassic	Jiulongshan Formation	China	A necrotauliid caddisfly. Type species is Acisarcuatus variradius.	
Bembridgea	Gen. et sp. nov	Valid	Sukatsheva	Late Eocene	Bembridge Marls	United Kingdom	A phryganeid caddisfly. Type species is Bembridgea insularia.	
Paleodicella	Gen. et sp. nov	Valid	Sukatsheva	Late Eocene	Bembridge Marls	United Kingdom	A caddisfly of uncertain phylogenetic placement. Type species is Paleodicella anomala.	
?Plectrocnemia incompleta	Sp. nov	Valid	Sukatsheva	Late Eocene	Bembridge Marls	United Kingdom	A polycentropodid caddisfly, possibly a species of Plectrocnemia.	
Wormaldia longaeva	Sp. nov	Valid	Sukatsheva	Late Eocene	Bembridge Marls	United Kingdom	A philopotamid caddisfly, a species of Wormaldia.	

== Clade Antliophora ==
=== Diptera ===
Name	Novelty	Status	Authors	Age	Unit	Location	Notes	Images
Archiaustroconops annae	Sp. nov	Valid	Choufani, Azar & Nel	Early Cretaceous		Lebanon	A member of Ceratopogonidae, a species of Archiaustroconops.	
Archiaustroconops dominiakae	Sp. nov	Valid	Choufani, Azar & Nel	Early Cretaceous		Lebanon	A member of Ceratopogonidae, a species of Archiaustroconops.	
Archiaustroconops hammanensis	Sp. nov	Valid	Choufani, Azar & Nel	Early Cretaceous		Lebanon	A member of Ceratopogonidae, a species of Archiaustroconops.	
Archirhagio mostovskii	Sp. nov	Disputed	Zhang	Latest Middle Jurassic (Callovian) or earliest Late Jurassic (Oxfordian)	Daohugou Beds	China	An archisargid brachyceran, a species of Archirhagio. Wang et al. (2017) consider this species to be a synonym of Archirhagio zhangi Zhang, Yang & Ren in Zhang et al. (2009), while Zhang (2017) maintains it as a distinct species.	
Archirhagio varius	Sp. nov	Valid	Zhang	Latest Middle Jurassic (Callovian) or earliest Late Jurassic (Oxfordian)	Daohugou Beds	China	An archisargid brachyceran, a species of Archirhagio.	
Archistempellina perkovskyi	Sp. nov	Valid	Zakrzewska & Giłka	Eocene	Baltic amber Rovno amber	Gdańsk Bay coast Ukraine	A non-biting midge of the tribe Tanytarsini, a species of Archistempellina.	
Bibio crassinervis	Sp. nov	Valid	Skartveit & Pika	Miocene		Croatia; Germany	A species of Bibio.	
Brachineura polessica	Sp. nov	Valid	Fedotova & Perkovsky	Late Eocene		Ukraine	A gall midge found in Rovno amber, a species of Brachineura.	
Bradysia aliciae	Sp. nov	Valid	Ramírez & Alonso	Pleistocene		Argentina	A member of Sciaridae.	
Burmapogon	Gen. et sp. nov	Valid	Dikow & Grimaldi	Cretaceous (Albian or Cenomanian)	Burmese amber	Myanmar	An asilid fly found in Burmese amber. The type species is Burmapogon bruckschi.	
Cretagaster	Gen. et sp. nov	Valid	Dikow & Grimaldi	Late Cretaceous (Turonian)	New Jersey Amber	United States	An asilid fly. The type species is Cretagaster raritanensis.	
Culicoides doyeni	Sp. nov	Valid	Choufani et al.	Late Cretaceous (middle Cenomanian to early Santonian, 97–85 Ma)		France	A member of Ceratopogonidae, a species of Culicoides.	
Dicranomyia (Dicranomyia) baltica	Sp. nov	Valid	Kania	Eocene	Baltic amber	Europe (Baltic Sea coast)	A species of Dicranomyia.	
Dicranomyia (Dicranomyia) ewa	Sp. nov	Valid	Kania	Eocene	Baltic amber	Europe (Baltic Sea coast)	A species of Dicranomyia.	
Dicranomyia (Dicranomyia) succinica	Sp. nov	Valid	Kania	Eocene	Baltic amber	Europe (Baltic Sea coast)	A species of Dicranomyia.	
Dicranomyia (Melanolimonia) krzeminskii	Sp. nov	Valid	Kania	Eocene	Baltic amber	Europe (Baltic Sea coast)	A species of Dicranomyia.	
Dilophus pumilio	Sp. nov	Valid	Skartveit & Pika	Miocene		Germany	A species of Dilophus.	
Dissup clausus	Sp. nov	Valid	Zhang, Yang and Ren	Early Cretaceous	Yixian Formation	China	An eremochaetid fly, a species of Dissup.	
Dominimyza	Gen. et sp. nov	Valid	Poinar	Tertiary		Dominican Republic	A sciomyzid fly found in Dominican amber. The type species is Dominimyza tanyacaena.	
Eoatrichops	Gen. et sp. nov	Valid	Myskowiak & Nel	Early Eocene		France	An ibis fly. The type species is Eoatrichops jeanbernardi.	
Eotrichocera (Archaeotrichocera) amabilis	Sp. nov	Valid	Dong, Shih & Ren	Middle Jurassic	Jiulongshan Formation	China	A trichocerid fly, a species of Eotrichocera.	
Eotrichocera (Archaeotrichocera) longensis	Sp. nov	Valid	Dong, Shih & Ren	Middle Jurassic	Jiulongshan Formation	China	A trichocerid fly, a species of Eotrichocera.	
Eremomukha (Eremomukha) angusta	Sp. nov	Valid	Zhang	Early Cretaceous	Yixian Formation	China	An eremochaetid fly, a species of Eremomukha.	
Eremomukha (Eremomukha) tenuissima	Sp. nov	Valid	Zhang	Early Cretaceous	Yixian Formation	China	An eremochaetid fly, a species of Eremomukha.	
Galloatherix	Gen. et sp. nov	Valid	Nel, de Ploëg & Perrichot	Cretaceous (late Albian or early Cenomanian)		France	Originally classified as an athericid fly; Grimaldi (2016) considered it to be a member of Tabanomorpha of uncertain phylogenetic placement, probably a basal tabanomorph. The type species is Galloatherix incompletus.	
Helius ewa	Sp. nov	Valid	Krzemiński, Kania & Azar	Early Cretaceous		Lebanon	A limoniid fly, a species of Helius.	
Helius fossilis	Sp. nov	Valid	Kania	Eocene	Baltic amber	Europe (Baltic Sea coast)	A species of Helius.	
Helius gedanicus	Sp. nov	Valid	Kania	Eocene	Baltic amber	Europe (Baltic Sea coast)	A species of Helius.	
Helius hoffeinsorum	Sp. nov	Valid	Kania	Eocene	Baltic amber	Europe (Baltic Sea coast)	A species of Helius.	
Helius similis	Sp. nov	Valid	Kania	Eocene	Baltic amber	Europe (Baltic Sea coast)	A species of Helius.	
Kovalevisargus haifanggouensis	Sp. nov	Valid	Zhang	Latest Middle Jurassic (Callovian) or earliest Late Jurassic (Oxfordian)	Daohugou Beds	China	A kovalevisargid brachyceran, a species of Kovalevisargus.	
Lebanoculicoides daheri	Sp. nov	Valid	Choufani, Azar & Nel	Early Cretaceous		Lebanon	A member of Ceratopogonidae, a species of Lebanoculicoides.	
Ledomyia olgae	Sp. nov	Valid	Fedotova & Perkovsky	Late Eocene		Ukraine	A gall midge found in Rovno amber, a species of Ledomyia.	
Lepteremochaetus elegans	Sp. nov	Valid	Zhang	Early Cretaceous	Yixian Formation	China	An eremochaetid fly, a species of Lepteremochaetus.	
Leptoconops (Leptoconops) gravesi	Sp. nov	Valid	Choufani et al.	Late Cretaceous (middle Cenomanian to early Santonian, 97–85 Ma)		France	A member of Ceratopogonidae, a species of Leptoconops.	
Leptotarsus buscalioniae	Sp. nov	Valid	Ribeiro & Lukashevich	Early Cretaceous (late Barremian)	La Huérguina Limestone Formation	Spain	A crane fly, a species of Leptotarsus.	
Leptotarsus contractus	Sp. nov	Valid	Ribeiro & Lukashevich	Early Cretaceous (late Barremian)	La Huérguina Limestone Formation	Spain	A crane fly, a species of Leptotarsus.	
Leptotarsus cretaceus	Sp. nov	Valid	Ribeiro & Lukashevich	Early Cretaceous (Aptian to Albian)	Santana Formation	Brazil	A crane fly, a species of Leptotarsus.	
Leptotarsus grimaldii	Sp. nov	Valid	Ribeiro & Lukashevich	Early Cretaceous (Aptian to Albian)	Santana Formation	Brazil	A crane fly, a species of Leptotarsus.	
Leptotarsus ibericus	Sp. nov	Valid	Ribeiro & Lukashevich	Early Cretaceous (late Barremian)	La Huérguina Limestone Formation	Spain	A crane fly, a species of Leptotarsus.	
Leptotarsus martinsnetoi	Sp. nov	Valid	Ribeiro & Lukashevich	Early Cretaceous (Aptian to Albian)	Santana Formation	Brazil	A crane fly, a species of Leptotarsus.	
Matuna	Gen. et sp. nov	Valid	Stebner & Solórzano Kraemer	Miocene		Mexico	A psychodid fly. The type species is Matuna bechlyi.	
Metanephrocerus belgardeae	Sp. nov	Valid	Archibald, Kehlmaier & Mathewes	Ypresian	Klondike Mountain Formation	United States	A pipunculid fly, a species of Metanephrocerus.	Metanephrocerus belgardeae
Metanephrocerus groehni	Sp. nov	Valid	Kehlmaier & Skevington	Priabonian	Baltic amber	Russia	A pipunculid fly, a species of Metanephrocerus.	
Metanephrocerus hoffeinsorum	Sp. nov	Valid	Kehlmaier & Skevington	Priabonian	Baltic amber	Russia	A pipunculid fly, a species of Metanephrocerus.	
Microphorites magaliae	Sp. nov	Valid	Perrichot & Engel	Late Cretaceous (middle Cenomanian to early Santonian, 97–85 Ma)		France	A member of Dolichopodidae, a species of Microphorites.	
Nannotanyderus oliviae	Sp. nov	Valid	Skibińska, Krzemiński & Coram	Early Jurassic (Sinemurian)		United Kingdom	A tanyderid fly, a species of Nannotanyderus.	
Nascensluna	Gen. et sp. nov	Valid	Fedotova & Perkovsky	Late Eocene		Ukraine	A gall midge found in Rovno amber. The type species is Nascensluna mellea.	
Notoatherix	Gen. et sp. nov	Valid	Oberprieler & Yeates	Late Jurassic	Talbragar Fish Bed	Australia	A member of Athericidae. The type species is Notoatherix antiqua.	
Novisargus	Gen. et sp. nov	Valid	Zhang	Latest Middle Jurassic (Callovian) or earliest Late Jurassic (Oxfordian)	Daohugou Beds	China	An archisargid brachyceran. The type species is Novisargus rarus.	
Ovisargus (Ovisargus) singulus	Sp. nov	Valid	Zhang	Latest Middle Jurassic (Callovian) or earliest Late Jurassic (Oxfordian)	Daohugou Beds	China	An archisargid brachyceran, a species of Ovisargus.	
Palaeoboreochlus	Gen. et sp. nov	Valid	Baranov & Andersen in Baranov, Andersen & Perkovsky	Late Eocene		Ukraine	A podonomine chironomid fly found in Rovno amber. The type species is Palaeoboreochlus inornatus.	
Palaeosystenus	Gen. et comb. nov	Valid	Grichanov, Negrobov & Selivanova	Late Eocene or early Oligocene	Baltic amber	Europe (Baltic Sea coast)	A member of the family Dolichopodidae belonging to the subfamily Medeterinae. The type species is "Porphyrops" succinorum Meunier (1907).	
Philosepedon apozonallii	Sp. nov	Valid	Stebner & Solórzano Kraemer	Miocene		Mexico	A psychodid fly, a species of Philosepedon.	
Pintomyia (Pifanomyia) bolontikui	Sp. nov	Valid	Ibáñez-Bernal et al.	Miocene		Mexico	A moth fly, a species of Pintomyia.	
Plecia macilenta	Sp. nov	Valid	Skartveit & Pika	Miocene		Germany	A species of Plecia.	
Popovineura	Gen. et sp. nov	Valid	Fedotova & Perkovsky	Late Eocene		Ukraine	A gall midge found in Rovno amber. The type species is Popovineura nacta.	
Priabona	Gen. et comb. nov	Valid	Archibald, Kehlmaier & Mathewes	Priabonian	Florissant Formation	United States	A pipunculid fly; a new genus for "Protonephrocerus" florissantius Carpenter and Hull.	
Protoculicoides krzeminskii	Sp. nov	Valid	Choufani, Azar & Nel	Early Cretaceous		Lebanon	A member of Ceratopogonidae. Originally described as a species of Protoculicoides; Szadziewski et al. (2016) transferred it to the genus Archiaustroconops, while Borkent (2019) transferred it to the genus Gerontodacus.	
Psychoda rusti	Sp. nov	Valid	Stebner & Solórzano Kraemer	Miocene		Mexico	A psychodid fly, a species of Psychoda.	
Psychoda tzotzili	Sp. nov	Valid	Stebner & Solórzano Kraemer	Miocene		Mexico	A psychodid fly, a species of Psychoda.	
Qiyia	Gen. et sp. nov	Valid	Chen et al.	Middle Jurassic	Daohugou Beds	China	An athericid fly. The type species is Qiyia jurassica.	
Reliquantha eocena	Sp. nov	Valid	Roháček	Middle Eocene	Baltic amber	Russia (Kaliningrad Oblast)	An anthomyzid fly.	Reliquantha eocena in Baltic amber
Rhizomyia parkalovi	Sp. nov	Valid	Fedotova & Perkovsky	Late Eocene	Rovno amber	Ukraine	A gall midge.	
Rovnobrachineura	Gen. et sp. nov	Valid	Fedotova & Perkovsky	Late Eocene	Rovno amber	Ukraine	A gall midge. The type species is R. kiryeyevi.	
Sharasargus maculus	Sp. nov	Valid	Zhang	Latest Middle Jurassic (Callovian) or earliest Late Jurassic (Oxfordian)	Daohugou Beds	China	An archisargid brachyceran, a species of Sharasargus.	
Similsciophila	Gen. et 2 sp. nov	Valid	Shi, Shih & Ren	Middle Jurassic	Jiulongshan Formation	China	A mesosciophilid nematoceran fly. Genus contains two species: Similsciophila singularis and Similsciophila sinuata.	
Stempellinella ivanovae	Sp. nov	Valid	Zakrzewska & Giłka	Eocene		Ukraine	A non-biting midge of the tribe Tanytarsini, a species of Stempellinella.	
Systenites	Gen. et comb. nov	Valid	Grichanov, Negrobov & Selivanova	Lutetian	Baltic amber	Europe	A Medeterinae Dolichopodidae. The type species is "Porphyrops" inclyta Meunier (1907); genus also includes "Porphyrops" arguta Meunier (1907) and "Xiphandrium" splendidum Meunier (1907).	
Tabanisargus	Gen. et sp. nov	Valid	Zhang	Latest Middle Jurassic (Callovian) or earliest Late Jurassic (Oxfordian)	Daohugou Beds	China	An archisargid brachyceran. The type species is Tabanisargus daohugouensis.	
Trichomyia axeli	Sp. nov	Valid	Stebner & Solórzano Kraemer	Miocene	Mexican amber	Mexico	A psychodid fly, a species of Trichomyia.	
Trichomyia richardi	Sp. nov	Valid	Stebner & Solórzano Kraemer	Miocene	Mexican Amber	Mexico	A psychodid fly, a species of Trichomyia.	

=== Mecoptera ===
Name	Novelty	Status	Authors	Age	Unit	Location	Notes	Images
Cimbrophlebia rara	Sp. nov	Valid	Wang, Shih & Ren	Early Cretaceous	Yixian Formation	China	A cimbrophlebiid mecopteran, a species of Cimbrophlebia.	
Exilibittacus foliaceus	Sp. nov	Valid	Liu, Shih & Ren	Middle Jurassic	Jiulongshan Formation	China	A hangingfly, a species of Exilibittacus.	
Exilibittacus plagioneurus	Sp. nov	Valid	Liu, Shih & Ren	Middle Jurassic	Jiulongshan Formation	China	A hangingfly, a species of Exilibittacus.	
Jurassipanorpa	Gen. et sp. nov	Valid	Ding, Shih & Ren	Middle Jurassic	Jiulongshan Formation	China	A scorpionfly. The type species is Jurassipanorpa impunctata. Also included is J. sticta	J. sticta
Mesoses gayndah	Sp. nov	Valid	Lambkin	Middle Triassic	Gayndah Formation	Australia	A mesopsychid mecopteran, a species of Mesoses.	
Mongolbittacus oligophlebius	Sp. nov	Valid	Liu, Shih & Ren	Middle Jurassic	Jiulongshan Formation	China	A hangingfly, a species of Mongolbittacus.	
Mongolbittacus speciosus	Sp. nov	Valid	Liu, Shih & Ren	Middle Jurassic	Jiulongshan Formation	China	A hangingfly, a species of Mongolbittacus.	

== Clade Archaeorthoptera ==
=== †Cnemidolestida ===
Name	Novelty	Status	Authors	Age	Unit	Location	Notes	Images
Anarkemina	Gen. et comb. nov	Valid	Aristov	Carboniferous (Pennsylvanian)	Verdigris Formation	United States	A member of Cnemidolestida/Cnemidolestodea (an extinct group of insects of uncertain phylogenetic placement, might be related to plecopterans or orthopterans); a new genus for "Narkemina" winsdoriensis Lewis (1979).	
Aviohapaloptera	Gen. et sp. nov	Valid	Prokop, Roques & Nel	Carboniferous (Moscovian)		France	A Cnemidolestodan Archaeorthopteran. The type species is Aviohapaloptera bethouxi.	
Fodinopenna	Gen. et sp. nov	Valid	Aristov	Late Carboniferous	Belyi Yar Formation	Russia	A member of Cnemidolestida/Cnemidolestodea. The type species is Fodinopenna abakanica.	
Hammelburgia	Gen. et sp. nov	Valid	Aristov	Middle Triassic (early Anisian)	Röt Formation	Germany	A member of Cnemidolestida/Cnemidolestodea. The type species is Hammelburgia selli.	
Ivkinus	Gen. et comb. nov	Valid	Aristov	Late Permian	Poldarsa Formation	Russia	A member of Cnemidolestida/Cnemidolestodea; a new genus for "Mezenalicula" conjucta Aristov & Storozhenko (2011).	
Kityakia	Gen. et sp. nov	Valid	Aristov	Middle Permian	Belebeevo Formation	Russia	A member of Cnemidolestida/Cnemidolestodea. The type species is Kityakia attrita.	
Pryg	Gen. et sp. nov	Valid	Aristov & Rasnitsyn	Early Permian	Wellington Formation	United States	A member of Cnemidolestida/Cnemidolestodea. The type species is Pryg absurdus.	
Xixia	Gen. et sp. nov	Valid	Gu, Béthoux & Ren	Late Carboniferous (Namurian)	Tupo Formation	China	A member of Cnemidolestida/Cnemidolestodea. The type species is Xixia huban.	
Yaria	Gen. et sp. nov	Valid	Aristov	Middle Permian	Izykh Formation	Russia	A member of Cnemidolestida/Cnemidolestodea. The type species is Yaria arenaria.	

=== Orthopterans ===
Name	Novelty	Status	Authors	Age	Unit	Location	Notes	Images
Crinoedischia lapeyriei	Sp. nov	Valid	Fernandes, Prokop & Nel	Permian (Guadalupian)	Lodève Basin	France	An orthopteran, a species of Crinoedischia.	
Electrotettix	Gen. et sp. nov	Valid	Heads & Thomas in Heads, Thomas & Wang	Early Miocene (Burdigalian)	Dominican amber	Dominican Republic	A tetrigid orthopteran. Type species is E. attenboroughi.	Electrotettix attenboroughi

=== Other archaeorthopterans ===
Name	Novelty	Status	Authors	Age	Unit	Location	Notes	Images
Aviologus	Gen. et sp. nov	Valid	Coty et al.	Carboniferous (Pennsylvanian)		France	An archaeorthopteran. Type species is Aviologus duquesnei.	
Bruaylogus	Gen. et sp. nov	Valid	Coty et al.	Carboniferous (Pennsylvanian)		France	A Panorthopteran archaeorthopteran. Type species is Bruaylogus magnificus.	

== Clade Coleopterida ==
=== Coleoptera ===
Name	Novelty	Status	Authors	Age	Unit	Location	Notes	Images
Abdera hoffeinsorum	Sp. nov	Valid	Alekseev	Eocene		Europe (Baltic Sea coast)	A false darkling beetle found in Baltic amber, a species of Abdera.	
Abdera rikojotensis	Sp. nov	Valid	Alekseev	Eocene		Europe (Baltic Sea coast)	A false darkling beetle found in Baltic amber, a species of Abdera.	
Acamptus exilipes	Sp. nov	Valid	Poinar & Legalov	Eocene or Miocene		Dominican Republic	A cossonine curculionid weevil, a species of Acamptus.	
Albicar	Gen. et sp. nov	Valid	Peris et al.	Early Cretaceous (early Albian)		Spain	A weevil belonging to the family Caridae. The type species is Albicar contriti.	
Alegorius	Gen. et sp. nov	Valid	Fikáček et al.	Early Cretaceous	Yixian Formation	China	A hydrophilid beetle. The type species is Alegorius yixianus.	
Ampliceps zimmermanni	Sp. nov	Valid	Legalov in Gratshev & Legalov	Jurassic	Karabastau Svita	Kazakhstan	A weevil belonging to the family Nemonychidae, a species of Ampliceps.	
Anaglyphites crassipygus	Sp. nov	Valid	Ponomarenko in Ponomarenko et al.	Late Jurassic		Mongolia	A cupedine beetle, a species of Anaglyphites.	
Anaglyphites minutissimus	Sp. nov	Valid	Ponomarenko in Ponomarenko et al.	Late Jurassic		Mongolia	A cupedine beetle, a species of Anaglyphites.	
Anlemmus	Gen. et sp. nov	Valid	Poinar & Legalov	Tertiary		Dominican Republic	A cryptorhynchine curculionid beetle. The type species is Anlemmus leptorhinus.	
Antillipeltis alleni	Sp. nov	Valid	Lawrence, Leschen & Ślipiński	Miocene	Dominican amber	Dominican Republic	A member of the family Trogossitidae.	
Antillipeltis iviei	Sp. nov	Valid	Lawrence, Leschen & Ślipiński	Miocene	Dominican amber	Dominican Republic	A member of the family Trogossitidae.	
Antiquis	Gen. et sp. nov	Valid	Peris et al.	Cretaceous (late Albian – early Cenomanian)		France	A weevil belonging to the family Curculionidae. The type species is Antiquis opaque.	
Apharosoma	Gen. et sp. nov	Valid	Poinar & Legalov	Tertiary		Dominican Republic	A cryptorhynchine curculionid beetle. The type species is Apharosoma euryrhina.	
Apionion formoculus	Sp. nov	Valid	Poinar & Legalov	Eocene or Miocene		Dominican Republic	An apionine brentid beetle found in Dominican amber, a species of Apionion.	
Apionion homochronon	Sp. nov	Valid	Poinar & Legalov	Eocene or Miocene		Dominican Republic	An apionine brentid beetle found in Dominican amber, a species of Apionion.	
Apionion kallimosum	Sp. nov	Valid	Poinar & Legalov	Eocene or Miocene		Dominican Republic	An apionine brentid beetle found in Dominican amber, a species of Apionion.	
Archaeorrhynchus carpenteri	Sp. nov	Valid	Legalov in Gratshev & Legalov	Jurassic	Karabastau Svita	Kazakhstan	A weevil belonging to the family Nemonychidae, a species of Archaeorrhynchus.	
Archosyne	Gen. et sp. nov	Valid	Ponomarenko, Yan & Huang	Permian (late Capitanian)		China	A beetle of uncertain phylogenetic placement. Originally assigned to the family Ademosynidae, but subsequently excluded from this family by Yan, Beutel & Ponomarenko (2017). The type species is Archosyne permiana.	
Arra	Gen. et sp. nov	Valid	Peris et al.	Early Cretaceous (early Albian)		Spain	A weevil belonging to the family Nemonychidae. The type species is Arra legalovi.	
Artematopodites latissimus	Sp. nov	Valid	Ponomarenko in Ponomarenko et al.	Late Jurassic		Mongolia	A member of Permosynidae, a species of Artematopodites.	
Asiocoleopsis	Gen. et sp. nov	Valid	Ponomarenko, Yan & Huang	Permian (late Capitanian)		China	An asiocoleid beetle. The type species is Asiocoleopsis hongi.	
Atomaria (Anchicera) groehni	Sp. nov	Valid	Lyubarsky & Perkovsky	Late Eocene	Baltic amber	Russia (Kaliningrad Oblast)	A silken fungus beetle.	
Attagenus gorskii	Sp. nov	Valid	Háva	Late Eocene	Prussian Formation	Poland	A skin beetle found in Baltic amber, a species of Attagenus.	
Baissalarva	Gen. et sp. nov	Valid	Fikáček et al.	Early Cretaceous		Russia	A hydrophilid beetle. The type species is Baissalarva hydrobioides.	
Baissimberis	Gen. et sp. nov	Valid	Gratshev & Legalov	Early Cretaceous	Baissa locality	Russia	A weevil belonging to the family Nemonychidae. The type species is Baissimberis prodigiosus.	
Belonotaris (Arnoldibelus) heeri	Sp. nov	Valid	Legalov in Gratshev & Legalov	Jurassic	Karabastau Svita	Kazakhstan	A weevil belonging to the family Nemonychidae, a species of Belonotaris.	
Belonotaris (Arnoldibelus) rasnitsyni	Sp. nov	Valid	Legalov in Gratshev & Legalov	Jurassic	Karabastau Svita	Kazakhstan	A weevil belonging to the family Nemonychidae, a species of Belonotaris.	
Belonotaris (Arnoldibelus) rohdendorfi	Sp. nov	Valid	Legalov in Gratshev & Legalov	Jurassic	Karabastau Svita	Kazakhstan	A weevil belonging to the family Nemonychidae, a species of Belonotaris.	
Bicalcasura	Gen. et sp. nov	Valid	Poinar & Legalov	Tertiary		Dominican Republic	A weevil found in Dominican amber. The type species is Bicalcasura maculata.	
Burmonyx	Gen. et sp. nov	Valid	David & Engel	Cretaceous (Albian or Cenomanian)	Burmese amber	Myanmar	A nemonychid weevil found in Burmese amber. Type species is Burmonyx zigrasi.	Burmonyx zigrasi
Calomicrus eocenicus	Sp. nov	Valid	Bukejs & Bezděk	Eocene (probably Priabonian)		Russia (Kaliningrad Oblast)	A galerucine leaf beetle, a species of Calomicrus.	
Caulophilus camptus	Sp. nov	Valid	Poinar & Legalov	Eocene or Miocene		Dominican Republic	A cossonine curculionid weevil, a species of Caulophilus.	
Caulophilus elongatus	Sp. nov	Valid	Poinar & Legalov	Eocene or Miocene		Dominican Republic	A cossonine curculionid weevil, a species of Caulophilus.	
Caulophilus ruidipunctus	Sp. nov	Valid	Poinar & Legalov	Eocene or Miocene		Dominican Republic	A cossonine curculionid weevil, a species of Caulophilus.	
Ceratocanthus emarginatus	Sp. nov	Valid	Poinar	Eocene or Miocene	Dominican amber	Dominican Republic	A ceratocanthine beetle. Originally described as a species of Ceratocanthus; transferred to the genus Germarostes by Poinar & Ballerio (2017).	
Chaocoleus	Gen. et sp. nov	Valid	Ponomarenko, Yan & Huang	Permian (late Capitanian)		China	An ademosynid beetle. The type species is Chaocoleus limnebius.	
Chinocimberis dispersus	Sp. nov	Valid	Gratshev & Legalov	Early Cretaceous	Tsagan Tsab Formation	Mongolia	A weevil belonging to the family Nemonychidae, a species of Chinocimberis.	
Coptoclavella jurassica	Sp. nov	Valid	Ponomarenko in Ponomarenko et al.	Late Jurassic		Mongolia	A member of Coptoclavidae, a species of Coptoclavella.	
Crassisyne	Gen. et sp. nov	Valid	Yan, Wang & Zhang	Early Cretaceous	Sharyn-Gol Formation	Mongolia	A lasiosynid beetle. The type species is Crassisyne ampla.	
Cratonemonyx	Gen. et sp. nov	Valid	Legalov in Gratshev & Legalov	Early Cretaceous	Crato Formation	Brazil	A weevil belonging to the family Nemonychidae. The type species is Cratonemonyx martinsnetoi.	
Crepidodera svetlanae	Sp. nov	Valid	Bukejs	Eocene		Russia (Kaliningrad Oblast)	A flea beetle found in Baltic amber, a species of Crepidodera.	
Cretamerus	Gen. et sp. nov	Valid	Peris, Kolibáč & Delclòs	Late Cretaceous (Cenomanian)		France	A member of Trogossitidae. The type species is Cretamerus vulloi.	
Cretasonoma	Gen. et sp. nov	Valid	Peris, Chatzimanolis & Delclòs	Early Cretaceous (Albian)		Spain	A pselaphine rove beetle. The type species is Cretasonoma corinformibus.	
Cretoxenus	Gen. et sp. nov	Valid	Fikáček et al.	Early Cretaceous		Australia	A hydrophilid beetle. The type species is Cretoxenus australis.	
Cretoxyporus	Gen. et sp. nov	Valid	Cai & Huang	Early Cretaceous	Yixian Formation	China	An oxyporine rove beetle. The type species is Cretoxyporus extraneus.	
Cryptohelops	Gen. et sp. nov	Valid	Nabozhenko & Kirejtshuk	Palaeocene		France	A darkling beetle. The type species is Cryptohelops menaticus.	
Curche	Gen. et sp. nov	Valid	Alekseev & Kazantsev	Eocene		Russia (Kaliningrad Oblast)	A soldier beetle found in Baltic amber. The type species is Curche pauli.	
Dignomus regiomontanus	Sp. nov	Valid	Alekseev	Eocene	Baltic amber	Europe (Baltic Sea coast)	A spider beetle. Originally described as a species of Dignomus; Alekseev, Bukejs & Bellés (2019) made it the type species of the separate genus Dignoptinus.	
Distenorrhinus (Distenorrhinus) ovatus	Sp. nov	Valid	Gratshev & Legalov	Early Cretaceous		Russia	A weevil belonging to the family Nemonychidae, a species of Distenorrhinus.	
Dryophilus hoffeinsorum	Sp. nov	Valid	Alekseev	Eocene		Europe (Baltic Sea coast)	A member of Dryophilinae found in Baltic amber, a species of Dryophilus.	
Dryophthorus microtremus	Sp. nov	Valid	Poinar & Legalov	Eocene or Miocene		Dominican Republic	A dryophthorid weevil found in Dominican amber, a species of Dryophthorus.	
Dryotribus pedanus	Sp. nov	Valid	Poinar & Legalov	Eocene or Miocene		Dominican Republic	A cossonine curculionid weevil, a species of Dryotribus.	
Duocalcar	Gen. et sp. nov	Valid	Peris & Thayer in Peris, Thayer & Néraudeau	Early Cretaceous (late Albian)		France	An omaliine rove beetle. The type species is Duocalcar geminum.	
Dzeregia platis	Sp. nov	Valid	Ponomarenko in Ponomarenko et al.	Late Jurassic		Mongolia	A member of Permosynidae, a species of Dzeregia.	
Eckfeldattagenus	Gen. et sp. nov	Valid	Háva & Wappler	Middle Eocene		Germany	An attagenine dermestid beetle. The type species is Eckfeldattagenus eocenicus.	
Electroabdera	Gen. et sp. nov	Valid	Alekseev	Eocene		Europe (Baltic Sea coast)	A false darkling beetle found in Baltic amber. The type species is Electroabdera marisbaltici.	
Eocenostenus	Sp. nov	Valid	Cai et al.	Late Eocene		France	A stenine rove beetle. The type species is E. fossilis.	Eocenostenus fossilis
Episcirrus isolepus	Sp. nov	Valid	Poinar & Legalov	Tertiary		Dominican Republic	A cryptorhynchine curculionid beetle, a species of Episcirrus.	
Episernus palvenikensis	Sp. nov	Valid	Alekseev	Eocene		Europe (Baltic Sea coast)	A member of Ernobiinae found in Baltic amber, a species of Episernus.	
Ernobius barticus	Sp. nov	Valid	Alekseev	Eocene		Europe (Baltic Sea coast)	A member of Ernobiinae found in Baltic amber, a species of Ernobius.	
Ernobius nadravicus	Sp. nov	Valid	Alekseev	Eocene		Europe (Baltic Sea coast)	A member of Ernobiinae found in Baltic amber, a species of Ernobius.	
Ernobius notangicus	Sp. nov	Valid	Alekseev	Eocene		Europe (Baltic Sea coast)	A member of Ernobiinae found in Baltic amber, a species of Ernobius.	
Ernobius varmicus	Sp. nov	Valid	Alekseev	Eocene		Europe (Baltic Sea coast)	A member of Ernobiinae found in Baltic amber, a species of Ernobius.	
Eulechriops argyrosoma	Sp. nov	Valid	Poinar & Legalov			Dominican Republic	A curculionid beetle found in Dominican amber, a species of Eulechriops.	
Europs insterburgensis	Sp. nov	Valid	Alekseev	Late Eocene		Russia (Kaliningrad Oblast)	A member of Monotomidae found in Baltic amber, a species of Europs.	
Gastrallus zjantaru	Sp. nov	Valid	Zahradník & Háva	Eocene		Poland	A member of Anobiinae found in Baltic amber, a species of Gastrallus.	
Geratozygops arsinotus	Sp. nov	Valid	Poinar & Legalov			Dominican Republic	A curculionid beetle found in Dominican amber, a species of Geratozygops.	
Geratozygops platysoma	Sp. nov	Valid	Poinar & Legalov			Dominican Republic	A curculionid beetle found in Dominican amber, a species of Geratozygops.	
Geratozygops stenosoma	Sp. nov	Valid	Poinar & Legalov			Dominican Republic	A curculionid beetle found in Dominican amber, a species of Geratozygops.	
Glaresis tridentata	Sp. nov	Valid	Bai, Beutel & Ren in Bai et al.	Early Cretaceous	Yixian Formation	China	A species of Glaresis.	
Glesirhanis	Gen. et sp. nov	Valid	Shockley & Alekseev	Eocene		Russia (Kaliningrad Oblast)	A leiestine endomychid beetle found in Baltic amber. The type species is Glesirhanis bercioi.	
Hadrobregmus ambericus	Sp. nov	Valid	Zahradník & Háva	Eocene		Poland	A member of Anobiinae found in Baltic amber, a species of Hadrobregmus.	
Helophorus costalis	Sp. nov	Valid	Ponomarenko in Ponomarenko et al.	Late Jurassic		Mongolia	A member of Helophoridae, a species of Helophorus.	
Homophthalmus kunnegsgarbensis	Sp. nov	Valid	Alekseev	Eocene		Europe (Baltic Sea coast)	A member of Dryophilinae found in Baltic amber, a species of Homophthalmus.	
Hydrobiites minor	Sp. nov	Valid	Ponomarenko in Ponomarenko et al.	Late Jurassic		Mongolia	A member of Polyphaga of uncertain phylogenetic placement, a species of Hydrobiites.	
Hydrobiites mongolicus	Sp. nov	Valid	Ponomarenko in Ponomarenko et al.	Late Jurassic		Mongolia	A member of Polyphaga of uncertain phylogenetic placement, a species of Hydrobiites.	
Hydrotrupes prometheus	Sp. nov	Valid	Gómez & Damgaard	Eocene		Europe	A dytiscid beetle found in Baltic amber, a species of Hydrotrupes.	
Hydroyixia	Gen. et 2 sp. nov	Valid	Fikáček et al.	Early Cretaceous	Yixian Formation	China	A hydrophilid beetle. Genus contains two species: Hydroyixia elongata and H. latissima.	
Japanopsimus balticus	Sp. nov	Valid	Vitali	Eocene or Oligocene		Europe (Baltic Sea coast)	A longhorn beetle found in Baltic amber, a species of Japanopsimus.	
Jurodes daohugouensis	Sp. nov	Valid	Yan et al.	Middle Jurassic	Daohugou Beds	China	A jurodid beetle, a species of Jurodes.	
Jurodes pygmaeus	Sp. nov	Valid	Yan et al.	Middle Jurassic	Daohugou Beds	China	A jurodid beetle, a species of Jurodes.	
Jurodes shartegiensis	Sp. nov	Valid	Yan in Ponomarenko et al.	Late Jurassic		Mongolia	A jurodid beetle, a species of Jurodes.	
Juropeltastica	Gen. et sp. nov	Valid	Cai et al.	Middle Jurassic	Daohugou Beds	China	A derodontid beetle. The type species is Juropeltastica sinica.	
Kachinus magnificus	Sp. nov	Valid	Peris, Chatzimanolis & Delclòs	Early Cretaceous (Albian)		Spain	A scydmaenine rove beetle. Originally classified as a species of Kachinus; subsequently assigned to the tribe Eutheiini and made the type species of a separate genus Archeutheia by Jałoszyński & Peris (2016).	
Lasiosyne laxa	Sp. nov	Valid	Yan, Wang & Zhang	Middle Jurassic	Daohugou Beds	China	A lasiosynid beetle, a species of Lasiosyne.	
Latitergum	Gen. et sp. nov	Junior homonym	Yu et al.	Middle Jurassic	Jiulongshan Formation	China	A member of Trogossitidae. The type species is Latitergum glabrum. The generic name is preoccupied by Latitergum Dangerfield, Austin & Whitfield (1999). Zhang (2021) coined a replacement generic name Neolatitergum.	
Latridius usovae	Sp. nov	Disputed	Sergi & Perkovsky	Late Eocene		Ukraine	A latridiid beetle found in Rovno amber, a species of Latridius. Reike et al. (2017) considered this species to be a junior synonym of Latridius alexeevi Bukejs, Kirejtshuk & Rücker (2011).	
Lemmasomus	Gen. et sp. nov	Valid	Poinar & Legalov	Tertiary		Dominican Republic	A cryptorhynchine curculionid beetle. The type species is Lemmasomus anodontotus.	
Linicupes	Gen. et sp. nov	Valid	Ponomarenko, Yan & Huang	Permian (late Capitanian)		China	A permocupedid beetle. The type species is Linicupes yinpinensis.	
Loculitricoleus mongolicus	Sp. nov	Valid	Ponomarenko in Ponomarenko et al.	Late Jurassic		Mongolia	A member of Asiocoleidae, a species of Loculitricoleus.	
Malthodes rovnoensis	Sp. nov	Valid	Kazantsev & Perkovsky	Late Eocene	Rovno amber	Ukraine	A soldier beetle.	
Marginulatus	Gen. et sp. nov	Valid	Yu et al.	Middle Jurassic	Jiulongshan Formation	China	A member of Trogossitidae. The type species is Marginulatus venustus.	
Mesapatetica	Gen. et sp. nov	Valid	Cai et al.	Middle Jurassic	Daohugou Beds	China	A rove beetle. The type species is Mesapatetica aenigmatica.	
Mesogyrus elongates	Sp. nov	Valid	Ponomarenko in Ponomarenko et al.	Late Jurassic		Mongolia	A whirligig beetle, a species of Mesogyrus.	
Microentomus	Gen. et sp. nov	Valid	Poinar in Poinar & Brown	Cretaceous	Burmese amber	Myanmar	A blister beetle found in Burmese amber. The type species is Microentomus epibatus.	
Microsyne	Gen. et sp. nov	Valid	Yan, Wang & Zhang	Early Cretaceous	Baissa locality	Russia	A lasiosynid beetle. The type species is Microsyne lauta.	
Neoulosomus (Neoulosomus) leptosomus	Sp. nov	Valid	Poinar & Legalov	Tertiary		Dominican Republic	A cryptorhynchine curculionid beetle, a species of Neoulosomus.	
Neoulosomus (Neoulosomus) megaholcus	Sp. nov	Valid	Poinar & Legalov	Tertiary		Dominican Republic	A cryptorhynchine curculionid beetle, a species of Neoulosomus.	
Neoulosomus (Neoulosomus) microholcus	Sp. nov	Valid	Poinar & Legalov	Tertiary		Dominican Republic	A cryptorhynchine curculionid beetle, a species of Neoulosomus.	
Neoulosomus (Neoulosomus) megus	Sp. nov	Valid	Poinar & Legalov	Tertiary		Dominican Republic	A cryptorhynchine curculionid beetle, a species of Neoulosomus.	
Neoulosomus (Neoulosomus) pedinus	Sp. nov	Valid	Poinar & Legalov	Tertiary		Dominican Republic	A cryptorhynchine curculionid beetle, a species of Neoulosomus.	
Neoulosomus (Neoulosomus) pediosomus	Sp. nov	Valid	Poinar & Legalov	Tertiary		Dominican Republic	A cryptorhynchine curculionid beetle, a species of Neoulosomus.	
Neoulosomus (Neoulosomus) platystegus	Sp. nov	Valid	Poinar & Legalov	Tertiary		Dominican Republic	A cryptorhynchine curculionid beetle, a species of Neoulosomus.	
Neoulosomus (Neoulosomus) scambosomus	Sp. nov	Valid	Poinar & Legalov	Tertiary		Dominican Republic	A cryptorhynchine curculionid beetle, a species of Neoulosomus.	
Neoulosomus (Neoulosomus) scambus	Sp. nov	Valid	Poinar & Legalov	Tertiary		Dominican Republic	A cryptorhynchine curculionid beetle, a species of Neoulosomus.	
Neoulosomus (Neoulosomus) stenocalypus	Sp. nov	Valid	Poinar & Legalov	Tertiary		Dominican Republic	A cryptorhynchine curculionid beetle, a species of Neoulosomus.	
Neoulosomus (Neoulosomus) stylolepus	Sp. nov	Valid	Poinar & Legalov	Tertiary		Dominican Republic	A cryptorhynchine curculionid beetle, a species of Neoulosomus.	
Neoulosomus (Stenosomus) contorhinus	Sp. nov	Valid	Poinar & Legalov	Tertiary		Dominican Republic	A cryptorhynchine curculionid beetle, a species of Neoulosomus.	
Neoulosomus (Stenosomus) tanyrhinus	Sp. nov	Valid	Poinar & Legalov	Tertiary		Dominican Republic	A cryptorhynchine curculionid beetle, a species of Neoulosomus.	
Nganasania taymyrica	Sp. nov	Valid	Lyubarsky & Perkovsky	Late Cretaceous (Coniacian-Santonian)	Kheta Formation (Taymyr amber)	Russia	A silken fungus beetle.	
Odontamera	Gen. et sp. nov	Valid	Poinar & Legalov	Tertiary		Dominican Republic	A cryptorhynchine curculionid beetle. The type species is Odontamera dolichosoma.	
Ogygius	Gen. et sp. nov	Valid	Poinar & Legalov	Eocene or Miocene		Dominican Republic	A cossonine curculionid weevil. The type species is Ogygius obrieni.	
Oxycorynoides (Pseudoxycorynoides) sukatshevae	Sp. nov	Valid	Legalov in Gratshev & Legalov	Jurassic	Karabastau Svita	Kazakhstan	A weevil belonging to the family Nemonychidae, a species of Oxycorynoides.	
Paracamptopsis	Gen. et sp. nov	Valid	Poinar & Legalov	Tertiary		Dominican Republic	A cryptorhynchine curculionid beetle. The type species is Paracamptopsis stenis.	
Paraulosomus adenolepus	Sp. nov	Valid	Poinar & Legalov	Tertiary		Dominican Republic	A cryptorhynchine curculionid beetle, a species of Paraulosomus.	
Pedostrangalia pristina	Sp. nov	Valid	Vitali	Eocene or Oligocene		Europe (Baltic Sea coast)	A longhorn beetle found in Baltic amber, a species of Pedostrangalia.	
Penarhytus	Gen. et sp. nov	Valid	Peris, Chatzimanolis & Delclòs	Early Cretaceous (Albian)		Spain	A pselaphine rove beetle. The type species is Penarhytus tenebris.	
Platycrossos latus	Sp. nov	Valid	Ponomarenko in Ponomarenko et al.	Late Jurassic		Mongolia	A member of Permosynidae, a species of Platycrossos.	
Platycrossos longus	Sp. nov	Valid	Ponomarenko in Ponomarenko et al.	Late Jurassic		Mongolia	A member of Permosynidae, a species of Platycrossos.	
Platycrossos loxonicus	Sp. nov	Valid	Ponomarenko in Ponomarenko et al.	Late Jurassic		Mongolia	A member of Permosynidae, a species of Platycrossos.	
Platycrossos mongolicus	Sp. nov	Valid	Ponomarenko in Ponomarenko et al.	Late Jurassic		Mongolia	A member of Permosynidae, a species of Platycrossos.	
Platycrossos ovum	Sp. nov	Valid	Ponomarenko in Ponomarenko et al.	Late Jurassic		Mongolia	A member of Permosynidae, a species of Platycrossos.	
Platydracus breviantennatus	Sp. nov	Valid	Cai et al.	Late Eocene		United States	A rove beetle, a species of Platydracus.	
Polysitum sharategense	Sp. nov	Valid	Ponomarenko in Ponomarenko et al.	Late Jurassic		Mongolia	A member of Polyphaga of uncertain phylogenetic placement, a species of Polysitum.	
Praedodromeus	Gen. et sp. nov	Valid	Strada, Montagna & Tintori	Middle Triassic (Ladinian)	Kalkschieferzone (uppermost member of the Meride Limestone)	Switzerland	A trachypachid. The type species is Praedodromeus sangiorgiensis.	
Probelus (Probelus) handlirschi	Sp. nov	Valid	Legalov in Gratshev & Legalov	Jurassic	Karabastau Svita	Kazakhstan	A weevil belonging to the family Nemonychidae, a species of Probelus.	
Probelus (Probelus) nikolaevi	Sp. nov	Valid	Legalov in Gratshev & Legalov	Jurassic	Karabastau Svita	Kazakhstan	A weevil belonging to the family Nemonychidae, a species of Probelus.	
Probelus (Probelus) scudderi	Sp. nov	Valid	Legalov in Gratshev & Legalov	Jurassic	Karabastau Svita	Kazakhstan	A weevil belonging to the family Nemonychidae, a species of Probelus.	
?Procalosoma incertum	Sp. nov	Valid	Ponomarenko in Ponomarenko et al.	Late Jurassic		Mongolia	A member of Trachypachidae, possibly a species of Procalosoma.	
Prosolierius parvus	Sp. nov	Valid	Peris, Chatzimanolis & Delclòs	Early Cretaceous (Albian)		Spain	A solieriine rove beetle, a species of Prosolierius.	
Protochares	Gen. et sp. nov	Valid	Fikáček et al.	Late Jurassic	Talbragar Fish Bed	Australia	A hydrophilid beetle. The type species is Protochares brevipalpis.	
Protoclaviger	Gen. et sp. nov	Valid	Parker & Grimaldi	Early Eocene		India	A pselaphine rove beetle found in Cambay amber. The type species is Protoclaviger trichodens.	
Protoxyporus	Gen. et sp. nov	Valid	Cai & Huang	Early Cretaceous	Yixian Formation	China	An oxyporine rove beetle. The type species is Protoxyporus grandis.	
Psammaegialia	Gen. et 2 sp. nov	Valid	Nikolajev, Wang & Zhang	Early Cretaceous	Yixian Formation	China	A scarab beetle belonging to the subfamily Aphodiinae. The type species is Psammaegialia abdita; genus also contains Psammaegialia zebrina.	
Pseudomoides	Gen. et sp. nov	Valid	Poinar & Legalov	Tertiary		Dominican Republic	A cryptorhynchine curculionid beetle. The type species is Pseudomoides clisaulis.	
Psyllototus groehni	Sp. nov	Valid	Bukejs & Nadein	Eocene	Prussian Formation	Russia (Kaliningrad Oblast)	A member of Galerucinae found in Baltic amber, a species of Psyllototus.	
Ptinus anastasiae	Sp. nov	Valid	Alekseev	Eocene		Europe (Baltic Sea coast)	A spider beetle found in Baltic amber, a species of Ptinus.	
Ptinus burukovskyi	Sp. nov	Valid	Alekseev	Eocene		Europe (Baltic Sea coast)	A spider beetle found in Baltic amber, a species of Ptinus.	
Ptinus incisus	Nom. nov	Valid	Zahradník & Háva	Late Eocene		Probably Russia (Kaliningrad Oblast)	A spider beetle found in Baltic amber, a species of Ptinus; a replacement name for Ptinus (Gynopterus) balticus Bellés & Vitali (2007) (preoccupied).	
Ptinus scalovicus	Sp. nov	Valid	Alekseev	Eocene		Europe (Baltic Sea coast)	A spider beetle found in Baltic amber, a species of Ptinus.	
Semnorhynchus brachyrhinus	Sp. nov	Valid	Poinar & Legalov	Tertiary		Dominican Republic	A cryptorhynchine curculionid beetle, a species of Semnorhynchus.	
Semnorhynchus campostegus	Sp. nov	Valid	Poinar & Legalov	Tertiary		Dominican Republic	A cryptorhynchine curculionid beetle, a species of Semnorhynchus.	
Semnorhynchus contorhinus	Sp. nov	Valid	Poinar & Legalov	Tertiary		Dominican Republic	A cryptorhynchine curculionid beetle, a species of Semnorhynchus.	
Semnorhynchus euryaspus	Sp. nov	Valid	Poinar & Legalov	Tertiary		Dominican Republic	A cryptorhynchine curculionid beetle, a species of Semnorhynchus.	
Semnorhynchus eurystegus	Sp. nov	Valid	Poinar & Legalov	Tertiary		Dominican Republic	A cryptorhynchine curculionid beetle, a species of Semnorhynchus.	
Semnorhynchus leptostegus	Sp. nov	Valid	Poinar & Legalov	Tertiary		Dominican Republic	A cryptorhynchine curculionid beetle, a species of Semnorhynchus.	
Semnorhynchus megasomus	Sp. nov	Valid	Poinar & Legalov	Tertiary		Dominican Republic	A cryptorhynchine curculionid beetle, a species of Semnorhynchus.	
Semnorhynchus stenostegus	Sp. nov	Valid	Poinar & Legalov	Tertiary		Dominican Republic	A cryptorhynchine curculionid beetle, a species of Semnorhynchus.	
Semnorhynchus tanyrhinus	Sp. nov	Valid	Poinar & Legalov	Tertiary		Dominican Republic	A cryptorhynchine curculionid beetle, a species of Semnorhynchus.	
Serropalpus ingemmescus	Sp. nov	Valid	Alekseev	Eocene		Europe (Baltic Sea coast)	A false darkling beetle found in Baltic amber, a species of Serropalpus.	
Serropalpus ryzhkovianus	Sp. nov	Valid	Alekseev	Eocene		Russia (Kaliningrad Oblast)	A false darkling beetle found in Baltic amber, a species of Serropalpus.	
Serropalpus vivax	Sp. nov	Valid	Alekseev	Eocene		Europe (Baltic Sea coast)	A false darkling beetle found in Baltic amber, a species of Serropalpus.	
Sodovia	Gen. et sp. nov	Valid	Ponomarenko in Ponomarenko et al.	Late Jurassic		Mongolia	A member of Schizophoridae. The type species is Sodovia sharotegica.	
Stenapion levigatum	Sp. nov	Valid	Poinar & Legalov	Eocene or Miocene		Dominican Republic	An apionine brentid beetle found in Dominican amber, a species of Stenapion.	
Stenhomalus hoffeinsorum	Sp. nov	Valid	Vitali	Eocene or Oligocene		Europe (Baltic Sea coast)	A longhorn beetle found in Baltic amber, a species of Stenhomalus.	
Stenommatus leptorhinus	Sp. nov	Valid	Poinar & Legalov	Eocene or Miocene		Dominican Republic	A dryophthorid weevil found in Dominican amber, a species of Stenommatus.	
Stenommatus tanyrhinus	Sp. nov	Valid	Poinar & Legalov	Eocene or Miocene		Dominican Republic	A dryophthorid weevil found in Dominican amber, a species of Stenommatus.	
Stephanopachys vetus	Sp. nov	Valid	Peris, Delclòs & Perrichot in Peris et al.	Cretaceous (latest Albian or earliest Cenomanian)		France	A bostrichid beetle, a species of Stephanopachys.	
Stenotrupis pumilis	Sp. nov	Valid	Poinar & Legalov	Eocene or Miocene		Dominican Republic	A cossonine curculionid weevil, a species of Stenotrupis.	
Succinapion	Gen. et sp. nov	Valid	Legalov & Bukejs	Late Eocene	Baltic amber	Russia (Kaliningrad Oblast)	A brentid beetle. The type species is Succinapion telnovi.	
Synchrotronia	Gen. et sp. nov	Valid	Soriano & Pollock in Soriano et al.	Early Cretaceous (latest Albian)		France	A tetratomid beetle. The type species is Synchrotronia idinineteena.	
Taldycupes pingi	Sp. nov	Valid	Ponomarenko, Yan & Huang	Permian (late Capitanian)		China	A taldycupedid beetle, a species of Taldycupes.	
Tersus minor	Sp. nov	Valid	Ponomarenko in Ponomarenko et al.	Late Jurassic		Mongolia	A member of Schizophoridae, a species of Tersus.	
Timarchopsis longus	Sp. nov	Valid	Ponomarenko in Ponomarenko et al.	Late Jurassic		Mongolia	A member of Coptoclavidae, a species of Timarchopsis.	
Toxorhynchus amphioculus	Sp. nov	Valid	Poinar & Legalov	Eocene or Miocene		Dominican Republic	An apionine brentid beetle found in Dominican amber, a species of Toxorhynchus.	
Toxorhynchus atriantenus	Sp. nov	Valid	Poinar & Legalov	Eocene or Miocene		Dominican Republic	An apionine brentid beetle found in Dominican amber, a species of Toxorhynchus.	
Toxorhynchus atriartus	Sp. nov	Valid	Poinar & Legalov	Eocene or Miocene		Dominican Republic	An apionine brentid beetle found in Dominican amber, a species of Toxorhynchus.	
Toxorhynchus convexoculus	Sp. nov	Valid	Poinar & Legalov	Eocene or Miocene		Dominican Republic	An apionine brentid beetle found in Dominican amber, a species of Toxorhynchus.	
Toxorhynchus convexus	Sp. nov	Valid	Poinar & Legalov	Eocene or Miocene		Dominican Republic	An apionine brentid beetle found in Dominican amber, a species of Toxorhynchus.	
Toxorhynchus dominicanus	Sp. nov	Valid	Poinar & Legalov	Eocene or Miocene		Dominican Republic	An apionine brentid beetle found in Dominican amber, a species of Toxorhynchus.	
Toxorhynchus fuscocorpus	Sp. nov	Valid	Poinar & Legalov	Eocene or Miocene		Dominican Republic	An apionine brentid beetle found in Dominican amber, a species of Toxorhynchus.	
Toxorhynchus hispaniolicus	Sp. nov	Valid	Poinar & Legalov	Eocene or Miocene		Dominican Republic	An apionine brentid beetle found in Dominican amber, a species of Toxorhynchus.	
Toxorhynchus hispidulus	Sp. nov	Valid	Poinar & Legalov	Eocene or Miocene		Dominican Republic	An apionine brentid beetle found in Dominican amber, a species of Toxorhynchus.	
Toxorhynchus leptorhinus	Sp. nov	Valid	Poinar & Legalov	Eocene or Miocene		Dominican Republic	An apionine brentid beetle found in Dominican amber, a species of Toxorhynchus.	
Toxorhynchus microsomus	Sp. nov	Valid	Poinar & Legalov	Eocene or Miocene		Dominican Republic	An apionine brentid beetle found in Dominican amber, a species of Toxorhynchus.	
Toxorhynchus robustus	Sp. nov	Valid	Poinar & Legalov	Eocene or Miocene		Dominican Republic	An apionine brentid beetle found in Dominican amber, a species of Toxorhynchus.	
Toxorhynchus stenelytrus	Sp. nov	Valid	Poinar & Legalov	Eocene or Miocene		Dominican Republic	An apionine brentid beetle found in Dominican amber, a species of Toxorhynchus.	
Triplax contienensis	Sp. nov	Valid	Alekseev	Eocene		Germany	A pleasing fungus beetle found in Bitterfeld amber, a species of Triplax.	
Tuberernobius	Gen. et sp. nov	Valid	Zahradník & Háva	Eocene		Poland	A member of Ernobiinae found in Baltic amber. The type species is Tuberernobius ambericus.	
Xylasia	Gen. et sp. nov	Valid	Zahradník & Háva	Eocene		Poland	A member of Xyletininae found in Baltic amber. The type species is Xylasia gorskii.	
Xylolaemus sakhnovi	Sp. nov	Valid	Alekseev & Lord	Eocene		Russia (Kaliningrad Oblast)	A cylindrical bark beetle found in Baltic amber, a species of Xylolaemus.	
Zygadenia giebeli	Sp. nov	Valid	Ponomarenko in Ponomarenko et al.	Late Jurassic		Mongolia	An ommatine beetle, a species of Zygadenia.	
Zygadenia handlirschi	Sp. nov	Valid	Ponomarenko in Ponomarenko et al.	Late Jurassic		Mongolia	An ommatine beetle, a species of Zygadenia.	

== Clade Dictyoptera ==
=== Blattodea ===
Name	Novelty	Status	Authors	Age	Unit	Location	Notes	Images
Archimesoblatta kopi	Sp. nov	Valid	Barna	Jurassic/Cretaceous boundary	Doronino Formation	Russia	A cockroach belonging to the family Mesoblattinidae.	
Blattula discors	Sp. nov	Valid	Barna	Jurassic/Cretaceous boundary	Doronino Formation	Russia	A cockroach belonging to the superfamily Corydoidea and the family Blattulidae.	
Ectobius kohlsi	Sp. nov	Valid	Vršanský et al.	Early Eocene	Green River Formation	United States	A cockroach, a species of Ectobius.	
Mastotermes nepropadyom	Sp. nov	Valid	Vršanský & Aristov	Jurassic/Cretaceous boundary	Doronino Formation	Russia	A termite, a species of Mastotermes.	
Mongolblatta sanguinea	Sp. nov	Valid	Barna	Jurassic/Cretaceous boundary	Doronino Formation	Russia	A cockroach belonging to the family Mesoblattinidae.	
Ponopterix burkhardi	Sp. nov	Valid	Nel, Prokop & Kirejtshuk in Nel et al.	Early Cretaceous (Aptian)	Crato Formation	Brazil	A cockroach. First described as a species of Ponopterix; Moved to Umenopterix burkhardi in (2016.	
Rhipidoblatta grandis	Sp. nov	Valid	Barna	Jurassic/Cretaceous boundary	Doronino Formation	Russia	A cockroach belonging to the family Caloblattinidae.	
Rhipidoblattina lacunata	Sp. nov	Valid	Barna	Jurassic/Cretaceous boundary	Doronino Formation	Russia	A cockroach belonging to the family Caloblattinidae.	
Santonitermes transbaikalicus	Sp. nov	Valid	Vršanský & Aristov	Jurassic/Cretaceous boundary	Doronino Formation	Russia	A termite, possibly a member of Hodotermitidae; a species of Santonitermes.	
Termitotron	Gen. et sp. nov	Valid	Engel	Late Cretaceous (middle Cenomanian to early Santonian, 97–85 Ma)		France	A termite. The type species is Termitotron vendeense.	

=== Mantodea ===
Name	Novelty	Status	Authors	Age	Unit	Location	Notes	Images
Cretophotina santanensis	Sp. nov	Valid	Lee	Early Cretaceous (late Aptian)	Crato Formation	Brazil	A mantis related to members of the genus Chaeteessa, a species of Cretophotina.	

== Hemiptera ==
Name	Novelty	Status	Authors	Age	Unit	Location	Notes	Images
Acanthocephalonotum	Gen. et sp. nov	Valid	Petrulevičius and Popov	Middle Eocene		Argentina	A discocephaline pentatomid hemipteran. Type species is Acanthocephalonotum martinsnetoi.	
Anthoscytina macula	Sp. nov	Valid	Hu, Yao & Ren	Early Cretaceous	Yixian Formation	China	A procercopid cicadomorph, a relative of froghoppers. Originally described as a species of Anthoscytina; subsequently transferred to the genus Stellularis by Chen et al. (2015), while Chen et al. (2020) transferred it to the genus Sinocercopis.	
Aonikenkissus	Gen. et sp. nov	Valid	Petrulevičius, Varela, Iglesias & Poiré in Petrulevičius et al.	Late Cretaceous (middle Cenomanian)	Mata Amarilla Formation	Argentina	A perforissid planthopper. The type species is Aonikenkissus zamunerae.	
Aradus leptosomus	Sp. nov	Valid	Heiss	Eocene		Europe	An aradid hemipteran found in Baltic amber, a species of Aradus.	
Aradus macrosomus	Sp. nov	Valid	Heiss	Eocene	Baltic amber	Europe	An aradid	Aradus macrosomus
Aradus penteneuros	Sp. nov	Valid	Heiss	Eocene		Europe	An aradid hemipteran found in Baltic amber, a species of Aradus.	
Aradus rotundiventris	Sp. nov	Valid	Heiss	Eocene		Europe	An aradid hemipteran found in Baltic amber, a species of Aradus.	
Arcantivelia	Gen. et sp. nov	Valid	Solórzano Kraemer & Perrichot in Solórzano Kraemer et al.	Cretaceous (Albian–Cenomanian boundary)		France	A veliid gerromorph. Type species is Arcantivelia petraudi.	
Brevaphrodella	Gen. et sp. nov	Valid	Dietrich & Gonçalves	Eocene (c. 44 Ma)		Lithuania	A leafhopper found in Baltic amber. Type species is Brevaphrodella nigra.	
Cicadocoris anisomeridis	Sp. nov	Disputed	Dong, Yao & Ren	Middle Jurassic	Jiulongshan Formation	China	A progonocimicid moss bug, a species of Cicadocoris. Jiang, Cai & Huang (2016) considered this species to be a junior synonym of Cicadocoris sinensis Hong (1983).	
Coryphocorixa	Gen. et sp. nov	Valid	Popov in Ponomarenko et al.	Late Jurassic		Mongolia	A member of Corixidae. The type species is Coryphocorixa zhangi.	
Cretaceomira	Gen. et sp. nov	Valid	McKellar & Engel	Late Cretaceous (Campanian)		Canada	A leptopodid leptopodomorph. The type species is Cretaceomira phalanx.	
Emilianovelia	Gen. et sp. nov	Valid	Solórzano Kraemer & Perrichot in Solórzano Kraemer et al.	Cretaceous (Albian–Cenomanian boundary)		France	A water treader. Type species is Emilianovelia audax.	
Eomegophthalmus	Gen. et sp. nov	Valid	Dietrich & Gonçalves	Eocene (ca. 44 Ma)		Lithuania	A leafhopper found in Baltic amber. Type species is Eomegophthalmus lithuaniensis.	
Flexicorpus	Gen. et sp. nov	Valid	Yao, Cai & Engel in Yao et al.	Early Cretaceous (early Aptian)	Yixian Formation	China	A torirostratid cimicomorph. Type species is Flexicorpus acutirostratus.	
Gallomesovelia	Gen. et sp. nov	Valid	Nel et al.	Late Jurassic (late Kimmeridgian)		France	A water treader. The type species is G. grioti.	Gallomesovelia grioti
Grimaldinia	Gen. et sp. nov	Valid	Popov & Heiss	Cretaceous (Albian or Cenomanian)	Burmese amber	Myanmar	A leptopodid spiny-legged bug. Type species is Grimaldinia pronotalis.	
Hexaphlebia	Gen. et sp. nov	Valid	Poinar in Poinar & Brown	Cretaceous	Burmese amber	Myanmar	A member of Schizopteridae. The type species is Hexaphlebia burmanica.	
Hypselosoma dominicana	Sp. nov	Valid	Poinar & Brown	Eocene or Miocene		Dominican Republic	A member of Schizopteridae found in Dominican amber, a species of Hypselosoma.	
Juraphis karataviensis	Sp. nov	Valid	Żyła, Blagoderov & Węgierek	Late Jurassic		Kazakhstan	A juraphidid aphidomorph hemipteran, a species of Juraphis.	
Jurategia	Gen. et 2 sp. nov	Valid	Popov in Ponomarenko et al.	Late Jurassic		Mongolia	A member of Naucoridae. The type species is Jurategia laticlavalis; genus also contains Jurategia yaoi.	
Kallicossus	Gen. et sp. nov	Valid	Chen, Zhang & Wang in Chen et al.	Middle Jurassic	Daohugou Beds	China	A member of Palaeontinidae. Type species is Kallicossus ningchengensis.	
Leptopharsa tacanae	Sp. nov	Valid	Coty, Garrouste & Nel	Late Oligocene to middle Miocene	Mexican Amber	Mexico	A lace bug found in Mexican amber.	
Lumatibialis	Gen. et sp. nov	Valid	Poinar in Poinar & Brown	Cretaceous	Burmese amber	Myanmar	A member of Schizopteridae. The type species is Lumatibialis burmitis.	
Malenavelia	Gen. et sp. nov	Valid	Solórzano Kraemer & Perrichot in Solórzano Kraemer et al.	Cretaceous (Albian–Cenomanian boundary)		France	A water treader. Type species is Malenavelia videris.	
Metoisops akingbohungbei	Sp. nov	Valid	Herczek and Popov	Late Eocene		Europe	An isometopine mirid, a species of Metoisops.	
Metoisops consimilis	Sp. nov	Valid	Herczek and Popov	Late Eocene		Europe	An isometopine mirid, a species of Metoisops.	
Metoisops grabenhorsti	Sp. nov	Valid	Herczek and Popov	Late Eocene		Europe	An isometopine mirid, a species of Metoisops.	
Metoisops groehni	Sp. nov	Valid	Herczek and Popov	Late Eocene		Europe	An isometopine mirid, a species of Metoisops.	
Metoisops intergerivus	Sp. nov	Valid	Herczek and Popov	Late Eocene		Europe	An isometopine mirid, a species of Metoisops.	
Metoisops punctatodiffusus	Sp. nov	Valid	Herczek and Popov	Late Eocene		Europe	An isometopine mirid, a species of Metoisops.	
Metoisops variabilis	Sp. nov	Valid	Herczek and Popov	Late Eocene		Europe	An isometopine mirid, a species of Metoisops.	
Parapryg	Gen. et sp. nov	Valid	Aristov & Rasnitsyn	Late Permian	Vokhma Formation	Russia	A planthopper belonging to the family Surijokocixiidae. The type species is Parapryg alogus.	
Prisciba	Gen. et 2 sp. nov	Valid	Poinar, Hamilton & Brown			Dominican Republic	A clastopterid froghopper found in Dominican amber. Genus contains two species: Prisciba serrata and Prisciba dominicana.	
Pterotella shartegensis	Sp. nov	Valid	Żyła, Blagoderov & Węgierek	Late Jurassic		Mongolia	A juraphidid aphidomorph hemipteran, a species of Pterotella.	
Riegerochterus	Gen. et sp. nov	Valid	Popov & Heiss	Miocene	Dominican amber	Dominican Republic	A member of the family Ochteridae. Type species is R. baehri.	
Schizoptera dominicana	Sp. nov	Valid	Poinar in Poinar & Brown	Eocene or Miocene		Dominican Republic	A member of Schizopteridae found in Dominican amber, a species of Schizoptera.	
Schizoptera hispaniolae	Sp. nov	Valid	Poinar in Poinar & Brown	Eocene or Miocene		Dominican Republic	A member of Schizopteridae found in Dominican amber, a species of Schizoptera.	
Shartegonaucoris	Gen. et sp. nov	Valid	Popov in Ponomarenko et al.	Late Jurassic		Mongolia	A member of Naucoridae. The type species is Shartegonaucoris weitingae.	
Tianyuprosbole	Gen. et sp. nov	Valid	Chen et al.	Middle Jurassic	Daohugou Beds	China	A tettigarctid. The type species is Tianyuprosbole zhengi.	
Torirostratus	Gen. et sp. nov	Valid	Yao, Shih & Engel in Yao et al.	Early Cretaceous (early Aptian)	Yixian Formation	China	A torirostratid cimicomorph. Type species is Torirostratus pilosus.	
Xestocephalites	Gen. et sp. nov	Valid	Dietrich & Gonçalves	Eocene (ca. 44 Ma)		Lithuania	A leafhopper found in Baltic amber. Type species is Xestocephalites balticus.	

== Hymenoptera ==
Name	Novelty	Status	Authors	Age	Unit	Location	Notes	Images
Aequixyela	Gen. et sp. nov	Valid	Wang, Rasnitsyn & Ren	Middle Jurassic	Jiulongshan Formation	China	A xyelid sawfly. The type species is Aequixyela immensa.	
Alavascelio	Gen. et sp. nov	Valid	Ortega-Blanco, McKellar & Engel.	Early Cretaceous (Albian)	Escucha Formation	Spain	A member of Scelionidae. The type species is A. delvallei.	
Amissascelio	Gen. et sp. nov	Valid	Ortega-Blanco, McKellar & Engel.	Early Cretaceous (Albian)	Escucha Formation	Spain	A member of Scelionidae. The type species is A. temporarius.	
Ampulicomorpha janzeni	Sp. nov	Valid	Olmi et al.	Late Cretaceous (early Cenomanian)	Burmese amber	Myanmar	An embolemid chrysidoid wasp found in Burmese amber, a species of Ampulicomorpha.	
Andrena antoinei	Sp. nov	Valid	Michez & De Meulemeester in Dehon et al.	Late Oligocene		France	An andrenid bee, a species of Andrena.	Andrena antoinei
Anomopterella brevis	Sp. nov	Valid	Li, Shih & Ren	Middle Jurassic (Bathonian/Callovian)	Jiulongshan Formation	China	An anomopterellid evanioid, a species of Anomopterella.	
Anomopterella pygmea	Sp. nov	Valid	Li, Shih & Ren	Middle Jurassic (Bathonian/Callovian)	Jiulongshan Formation	China	An anomopterellid evanioid, a species of Anomopterella.	
Archaeagaon	Gen. et comb. nov	Valid	Compton in Antropov et al.	Late Eocene	Bembridge Marls	Isle of Wight	A member of the family Agaonidae; a new genus for "Ponera" minuta Donisthorpe (1920).	
Archaeohelorus polyneurus	Sp. nov	Valid	Shi et al.	Middle Jurassic	Jiulongshan Formation	China	A helorid proctotrupoid, a species of Archaeohelorus.	
Archaeohelorus tensus	Sp. nov	Valid	Shi et al.	Middle Jurassic	Jiulongshan Formation	China	A helorid proctotrupoid, a species of Archaeohelorus.	
Archaulacus	Gen. et sp. nov	Valid	Li, Shih & Ren	Middle Jurassic	Jiulongshan Formation	China	A praeaulacid evanioid. The type species is Archaulacus probus.	
Archencyrtus	Gen. et sp. nov	Valid	Simutnik	Middle Eocene	Sakhalin amber	Russia	Encyrtidae incertae sedis. Type species A. rasnitsyni.	
Ascogaster brodiei	Sp. nov	Valid	Belokobylskij in Antropov et al.	Late Eocene	Bembridge Marls	Isle of Wight	A member of Braconidae belonging to the subfamily Cheloninae.	
Ascogaster pygmaea	Sp. nov	Valid	Belokobylskij in Antropov et al.	Late Eocene	Bembridge Marls	Isle of Wight	A member of Braconidae belonging to the subfamily Cheloninae.	
Ascogaster yulei	Sp. nov	Valid	Belokobylskij in Antropov et al.	Late Eocene	Bembridge Marls	Isle of Wight	A member of Braconidae belonging to the subfamily Cheloninae.	
Aspicolpus temporalis	Sp. nov	Valid	Belokobylskij in Antropov et al.	Late Eocene	Bembridge Marls	Isle of Wight	A member of Braconidae belonging to the subfamily Helconinae.	
Bassus magnareola	Sp. nov	Valid	Belokobylskij in Antropov et al.	Late Eocene	Bembridge Marls	Isle of Wight	A member of Braconidae belonging to the subfamily Agathidinae.	
Bembracon	Gen. et 2 sp. nov	Valid	Belokobylskij in Antropov et al.	Late Eocene	Bembridge Marls	Isle of Wight	A member of Braconidae belonging to the subfamily Braconinae. The type species is B. acourtsmithi; genus also includes B. medialis.	
Bombus cerdanyensis	Sp. nov	Valid	Dehon, De Meulemeester & Engel in Dehon et al.	Late Miocene		Spain	A bumblebee.	Bombus cerdanyensis
Bracon? antefurcalis	Sp. nov	Valid	Belokobylskij in Antropov et al.	Late Eocene	Bembridge Marls	Isle of Wight	A member of Braconidae belonging to the subfamily Braconinae.	
Bracon brodiei	Sp. nov	Valid	Belokobylskij in Antropov et al.	Late Eocene	Bembridge Marls	Isle of Wight	A species of Bracon.	
Britaneuretus	Gen. et comb. nov	Valid	Dlussky & Perfilieva in Antropov et al.	Late Eocene	Bembridge Marls	Isle of Wight	An ant belonging to the new subfamily Aneuretinae; a new genus for "Dolichoderus" anglicus Cockerell (1915).	
Bruescelio	Gen. et sp. nov	Valid	Ortega-Blanco, McKellar & Engel.	Early Cretaceous (Albian)	Escucha Formation	Spain	A member of Scelionidae. The type species is B. platycephalus.	
Burmadryinus	Gen. et sp. nov	Valid	Olmi, Xu & Guglielmino	Late Cretaceous (early Cenomanian)	Burmese amber	Myanmar	A member of Dryinidae found in Burmese amber. The type species is Burmadryinus cenomanianus.	
Camponotus cockerelli	Comb nov	Valid	(Donisthorpe, 1920)	Late Eocene	Bembridge Marls	Isle of Wight	A carpenter ant, new comb for Leucotaphus cockerelli Donisthorpe, 1920	
Cathayxyela	Gen. et sp. nov	Valid	Wang, Rasnitsyn & Ren	Middle Jurassic	Jiulongshan Formation	China	A xyelid sawfly. The type species is Cathayxyela extensa.	
Casaleia longiventris	Comb. nov	Valid	(Heer)	Early Miocene	Radoboj	Croatia	An amblyoponine ant. new combination for Formica longiventris	Casaleia longiventris
Celonophamia granama	Sp. nov	Valid	McKellar & Engel	Late Cretaceous (Campanian)		Canada	A bethylid wasp, a species of Celonophamia.	
Chremylus infuscatus	Sp. nov	Valid	Belokobylskij in Antropov et al.	Late Eocene	Bembridge Marls	Isle of Wight	A member of Braconidae belonging to the subfamily Exothecinae.	
Chubakka	Gen. et sp. nov	Valid	Kopylov	Triassic	Madygen Formation	Kyrgyzstan	A madygelline xyelid sawfly. The type species is Chubakka madygensis.	
Cretembolemus	Gen. et sp. nov	Valid	Olmi et al.	Late Cretaceous (Turonian)		Botswana	An embolemid chrysidoid wasp. The type species is Cretembolemus orapensis.	
Diospilus curtithorax	Sp. nov	Valid	Belokobylskij in Antropov et al.	Late Eocene	Bembridge Marls	Isle of Wight	A member of Braconidae belonging to the subfamily Helconinae.	
Dolichoderus heeri	Sp. nov	Valid	Dlussky & Putyatina	Early Miocene	Radoboj	Croatia	A dolichoderine ant	D. heeri
Dolopsidea? intermedia	Sp. nov	Valid	Belokobylskij in Antropov et al.	Late Eocene	Bembridge Marls	Isle of Wight	A member of Braconidae belonging to the subfamily Rhyssalinae.	
Dryophia	Gen. et sp. nov	Valid	Antropov in Antropov et al.	Late Eocene	Bembridge Marls	Isle of Wight	A member of the family Tiphiidae belonging to the new subfamily Dryophiinae. The type species is D. oculata.	
Electroteleiopsis	Gen. et sp. nov	Valid	Ortega-Blanco, McKellar & Engel.	Early Cretaceous (Albian)	Escucha Formation	Spain	A member of Scelionidae. The type species is E. hebdomas.	
Emplastus antiquus	Comb. nov	Valid	Dlussky & Putyatina	Early Miocene	Radoboj	Croatia	An ant, a species of Emplastus.	
Emplastus dubius	Sp. nov	Valid	Dlussky & Putyatina	Early Miocene	Radoboj	Croatia	An ant, a species of Emplastus.	Emplastus dubius
Emplastus haueri	Comb. nov	Valid	Dlussky & Putyatina	Early Miocene	Radoboj	Croatia	An ant, a species of Emplastus.	
Emplastus kozlovi	Sp. nov	Valid	Dlussky & Perfilieva in Antropov et al.	Late Eocene	Bembridge Marls	Isle of Wight	An ant, a species of Emplastus.	
Emplastus miocenicus	Sp. nov	Valid	Dlussky & Putyatina	Early Miocene	Radoboj	Croatia	An ant, a species of Emplastus.	Emplastus miocenicus
Emplastus (?) ocellus	Comb. nov	Valid	Dlussky & Putyatina	Early Miocene	Radoboj	Croatia	An ant, a species of Emplastus.	Emplastus (?) ocellus
Eocencnemus gedanicus	Sp. nov	Valid	Simutnik, Perkovsky & Gumovsky	Late Eocene		Europe	An encyrtid found in Baltic amber, a species of Eocencnemus.	
Eubazus? brodiei	Sp. nov	Valid	Belokobylskij in Antropov et al.	Late Eocene	Bembridge Marls	Isle of Wight	A member of Braconidae belonging to the subfamily Brachistinae.	
Eubazus flavistigma	Sp. nov	Valid	Belokobylskij in Antropov et al.	Late Eocene	Bembridge Marls	Isle of Wight	A species of Eubazus.	
Eubazus? grandareola	Sp. nov	Valid	Belokobylskij in Antropov et al.	Late Eocene	Bembridge Marls	Isle of Wight	A member of Braconidae belonging to the subfamily Brachistinae.	
Eubazus? hooleyi	Sp. nov	Valid	Belokobylskij in Antropov et al.	Late Eocene	Bembridge Marls	Isle of Wight	A member of Braconidae belonging to the subfamily Brachistinae.	
Eubazus nanus	Sp. nov	Valid	Belokobylskij in Antropov et al.	Late Eocene	Bembridge Marls	Isle of Wight	A species of Eubazus.	
Euglossopteryx	Gen. et sp. nov	Valid	Dehon & Engel in Dehon et al.	Middle Eocene	Green River Formation	United States	An apid bee. The type species is E. biesmeijeri De Meulemeester, Michez & Engel	Euglossopteryx biesmeijeri
Eulaema (Apeulaema) zigrasi	Sp. nov	Valid	Engel	Early Miocene		Mexico	A euglossine bee, a species of Eulaema.	
Eupsenella aulax	Sp. nov	Valid	Ramos & Azevedo in Ramos et al.	Eocene		Europe	A bethylid wasp, a species of Eupsenella.	
Eupsenella klesoviana	Sp. nov	Valid	Ramos & Azevedo in Ramos et al.	Eocene		Ukraine	A bethylid wasp found in Rovno amber, a species of Eupsenella.	
Eupsenella rossica	Sp. nov	Valid	Ramos & Azevedo in Ramos et al.	Eocene		Russia (Kaliningrad Oblast)	A bethylid wasp found in Baltic amber, a species of Eupsenella.	
Eupsenella yantarnica	Sp. nov	Valid	Ramos & Azevedo in Ramos et al.	Eocene		Russia (Kaliningrad Oblast)	A bethylid wasp found in Baltic amber, a species of Eupsenella.	
Eusterinx humalai	Sp. nov	Valid	Khalaim in Antropov et al.	Late Eocene	Bembridge Marls	Isle of Wight	A member of Ichneumonidae belonging to the subfamily Orthocentrinae.	
Exeristes gurnetor	Sp. nov	Valid	Khalaim in Antropov et al.	Late Eocene	Bembridge Marls	Isle of Wight	A species of Exeristes.	
Formica parexsecta	Sp. nov	Valid	Dlussky & Putyatina	Early Miocene	Radoboj	Croatia	An ant, a species of Formica.	
Gesomyrmex bremii	Comb. nov	Valid	Dlussky & Putyatina	Early Miocene	Radoboj	Croatia	A formicine ant.	
Glaesus	Gen. et sp. nov	Valid	Simutnik, Perkovsky & Gumovsky	Late Eocene		Europe	An encyrtid found in Baltic amber. The type species is Glaesus gibsoni.	
Goniozus definitus	Sp. nov	Valid	Ramos & Azevedo in Ramos et al.	Eocene		Russia (Kaliningrad Oblast)	A bethylid wasp found in Baltic amber, a species of Goniozus.	
Heeridris	Gen. et sp. nov	Valid	Dlussky & Putyatina	Early Miocene		Croatia	An ant. The type species is Heeridris croaticus.	
Hellenius? kozlovi	Sp. nov	Valid	Belokobylskij in Antropov et al.	Late Eocene	Bembridge Marls	Isle of Wight	A member of Braconidae belonging to the subfamily Helconinae.	
"Hemiteles" dirus	Sp. nov	Valid	Khalaim in Antropov et al.	Late Eocene	Bembridge Marls	Isle of Wight	A member of Ichneumonidae belonging to the subfamily Cryptinae.	
"Hemiteles" protervus	Sp. nov	Valid	Khalaim in Antropov et al.	Late Eocene	Bembridge Marls	Isle of Wight	A member of Ichneumonidae belonging to the subfamily Cryptinae.	
Homolobus rasnitsyni	Sp. nov	Valid	Belokobylskij in Antropov et al.	Late Eocene	Bembridge Marls	Isle of Wight	A member of Braconidae belonging to the subfamily Homolobinae.	
Juxtascelio	Gen. et sp. nov	Valid	Ortega-Blanco, McKellar & Engel.	Early Cretaceous (Albian)	Escucha Formation	Spain	A member of Scelionidae. The type species is J. interitus.	
Karataus daohugouensis	Sp. nov	Valid	Zhang et al.	Middle–Late Jurassic	Daohugou Beds	China	An ephialtitid wasp, a species of Karataus.	
Karataus exilis	Sp. nov	Valid	Zhang et al.	Middle–Late Jurassic	Daohugou Beds	China	An ephialtitid wasp, a species of Karataus.	
Karataus orientalis	Sp. nov	Valid	Zhang et al.	Middle–Late Jurassic	Daohugou Beds	China	An ephialtitid wasp, a species of Karataus.	
Karataus strenuus	Sp. nov	Valid	Zhang et al.	Middle–Late Jurassic	Daohugou Beds	China	An ephialtitid wasp, a species of Karataus.	
Karataus vigoratus	Sp. nov	Valid	Zhang et al.	Middle–Late Jurassic	Daohugou Beds	China	An ephialtitid wasp, a species of Karataus.	
Khasips	Gen. et 3 sp. nov	Valid	Kopylov	Early Cretaceous		Russia	An archaeocynipid cynipoid. Genus contains three species: Khasips alisectus, K. sculptus and K. kovalevi.	
Lasius anthracinus	Comb. nov	Valid	Dlussky & Putyatina	Early Miocene	Radoboj	Croatia	A formicine ant	
Lasius ophthalmicus	Comb. nov	Valid	Dlussky & Putyatina	Early Miocene	Radoboj	Croatia	A formicine ant	
Leucotaphus donisthorpei	Sp. nov	Valid	Dlussky & Perfilieva in Antropov et al.	Late Eocene	Bembridge Marls	Isle of Wight	A formicine ant	
Lithapechtis salmacidus	Sp. nov	Valid	Khalaim in Antropov et al.	Late Eocene	Bembridge Marls	Isle of Wight	A member of Ichneumonidae of uncertain phylogenetic placement.	
Lytopsenella baltica	Sp. nov	Valid	Ramos & Azevedo in Ramos et al.	Eocene		Europe	A bethylid wasp found in Baltic amber, a species of Lytopsenella.	
Lytopsenella maritima	Sp. nov	Valid	Ramos & Azevedo in Ramos et al.	Eocene		Europe	A bethylid wasp, a species of Lytopsenella.	
Macroteleia yaguarum	Sp. nov	Valid	Perrichot & Engel in Perrichot et al.	Miocene (~12 Mya)	Pebas Formation	Peru	A scelionine wasp, a species of Macroteleia.	
Madygella aristovi	Sp. nov	Valid	Kopylov	Triassic	Madygen Formation	Kyrgyzstan	A madygelline xyelid sawfly, a species of Madygella.	
Madygella bashkuevi	Sp. nov	Valid	Kopylov	Triassic	Madygen Formation	Kyrgyzstan	A madygelline xyelid sawfly, a species of Madygella.	
Madygella kurochkini	Sp. nov	Valid	Kopylov	Triassic	Madygen Formation	Kyrgyzstan	A madygelline xyelid sawfly, a species of Madygella.	
Madygella levivenosa	Sp. nov	Valid	Kopylov	Triassic	Madygen Formation	Kyrgyzstan	A madygelline xyelid sawfly, a species of Madygella.	
Marjorietta gigantea	Sp. nov	Valid	Khalaim in Antropov et al.	Late Eocene	Bembridge Marls	Isle of Wight	A member of Ichneumonidae belonging to the subfamily Townesitinae.	
Menopsila	Gen. et sp. nov	Valid	Bennett, Perrichot & Engel	Late Cretaceous (middle Cenomanian to early Santonian, 97–85 Ma)		France	A pemphredonine crabronid wasp. The type species is Menopsila dupeae.	
Mesocentrus palaeoeuropaea	Sp. nov	Valid	Butcher et al.	Eocene		Europe	A betylobraconine braconid wasp found in Baltic amber, a species of Mesocentrus.	
Meteorus applanatus	Sp. nov	Valid	Belokobylskij in Antropov et al.	Late Eocene	Bembridge Marls	Isle of Wight	A species of Meteorus.	
Meteorus crassitergum	Sp. nov	Valid	Belokobylskij in Antropov et al.	Late Eocene	Bembridge Marls	Isle of Wight	A species of Meteorus.	
Mochlomelikertes	Gen. et sp. nov	Valid	Engel, Breitkreuz & Ohl	Eocene (Lutetian)		Europe	A melikertine apid bee found in Baltic amber. The type species is Mochlomelikertes hoffeinsorum.	
Myrmecites latus	Sp. nov	Valid	Dlussky & Putyatina	Early Miocene		Croatia	A myrmicine ant	
Myrmecites pusillus	Comb. nov	Valid	Dlussky & Putyatina	Early Miocene		Croatia	A myrmicine ant	
Odontomachus paleomyagra	Sp. nov	Valid	Wappler et al.	Early Miocene (Burdigalian)	Most Basin	Czech Republic	A ponerine ant	Odontomachus paleomyagra
Oligobombus	Gen. et sp. nov	Valid	Antropov in Antropov et al.	Late Eocene	Bembridge Marls	Isle of Wight	A genus of Bombini. The type species is O. cuspidatus.	Oligobombus cuspidatus
Oncophanes andrewrossi	Sp. nov	Valid	Belokobylskij in Antropov et al.	Late Eocene	Bembridge Marls	Isle of Wight	A member of Braconidae belonging to the subfamily Rhyssalinae.	
Ontsira cenozoica	Sp. nov	Valid	Belokobylskij in Antropov et al.	Late Eocene	Bembridge Marls	Isle of Wight	A member of Braconidae belonging to the subfamily Doryctinae.	
Oxyserphus kozlovi	Sp. nov	Valid	Kolyada in Antropov et al.	Late Eocene	Bembridge Marls	Isle of Wight	A member of the family Proctotrupidae.	
Palaeomicrogaster	Gen. et sp. nov	Valid	Belokobylskij in Antropov et al.	Late Eocene	Bembridge Marls	Isle of Wight	A member of Braconidae belonging to the subfamily Microgastrinae. The type species is P. oculatus.	
Palaeopolistes	Gen. et sp. nov	Valid	Perrard, Nel & Carpenter	Late Eocene		France	A polistine vespid wasp. The type species is Palaeopolistes jattioti.	Palaeopolistes jattioti
Palaeopolybia	Gen. et comb. nov	Valid	Antropov in Antropov et al.	Late Eocene	Bembridge Marls	Isle of Wight	A member of Vespidae belonging to the subfamily Polistinae; a new genus for "Polybia" anglica Cockerell (1921).	
Palaeoscolia	Gen. et sp. nov	Valid	Antropov in Antropov et al.	Late Eocene	Bembridge Marls	Isle of Wight	A member of the family Scoliidae belonging to the new subfamily Palaeoscoliinae. The type species is P. relicta.	
Paraphaenogaster hooleyana	Sp. nov	Valid	Dlussky & Putyatina	Priabonian	Bembridge Marls	Isle of Wight	A myrmecine ant	Paraphaenogaster hooleyana
Paraphaenogaster jurinei	Comb. nov	Valid	Dlussky & Putyatina	Early Miocene	Radoboj	Croatia	A myrmecine ant	Paraphaenogaster jurinei
Paraphaenogaster tertiaria	Comb. nov	Valid	Dlussky & Putyatina	Early Miocene	Radoboj	Croatia	A myrmecine ant	Paraphaenogaster tertiaria
Paxylobembra	Gen. et sp. nov	Valid	Khalaim in Antropov et al.	Late Eocene	Bembridge Marls	Isle of Wight	A member of Ichneumonidae belonging to the subfamily Paxylommatinae. The type species is P. kozlovi.	
Perimoscelio	Gen. et 2 sp. nov	Valid	Ortega-Blanco, McKellar & Engel.	Early Cretaceous (Albian)	Escucha Formation	Spain	A member of Scelionidae. The type species is P. tyrbastes; genus also includes P. confector.	
Phasmatopelecinus	Gen. et sp. nov	Valid	Greenwalt & Engel	Eocene (Lutetian)	Kishenehn Formation	United States	A pelecinid. The type species is Phasmatopelecinus leonae.	
Plisomena	Gen. et sp. nov	Valid	Antropov in Antropov et al.	Late Eocene	Bembridge Marls	Isle of Wight	A member of the family Crabronidae belonging to the subfamily Pemphredoninae. The type species is P. gigantea.	
Ponerites antropovi	Sp. nov	Valid	Dlussky & Perfilieva in Antropov et al.	Late Eocene	Bembridge Marls	Isle of Wight	A ponerine ant	
Ponerites atavinus	Comb. nov	Valid	Dlussky & Putyatina	Early Miocene	Radoboj	Croatia	A ponerine ant	
Ponerites elongatus	Comb. nov	Valid	Dlussky & Putyatina	Early Miocene	Radoboj	Croatia	A ponerine ant	
Ponerites gracilior	nom. nov	Valid	Dlussky & Putyatina	Early Miocene		Croatia	An ant, a species of Ponerites.	
Ponerites hooleyi	Sp. nov	Valid	Dlussky & Perfilieva in Antropov et al.	Late Eocene	Bembridge Marls	Isle of Wight	A ponerine ant	
Ponerites nitidus	Comb. nov	Valid	Dlussky & Putyatina	Early Miocene	Radoboj	Croatia	A ponerine ant	
Ponerites oblongiceps	Sp. nov	Valid	Dlussky & Putyatina	Early Miocene		Croatia	An ant, a species of Ponerites.	
Ponerites tenuis	Comb. nov	Valid	Dlussky & Putyatina	Early Miocene	Radoboj	Croatia	A ponerine ant	
Potrerilloxyela	Gen. et sp. nov	Valid	Lara, Rasnitsyn & Zavattieri	Late Triassic	Potrerillos Formation	Argentina	A member of Xyelidae. The type species is Potrerilloxyela menendezi.	
Praeaulacus obtutus	Sp. nov	Valid	Li, Shih & Ren	Middle Jurassic	Jiulongshan Formation	China	A praeaulacid wasp, a species of Praeaulacus.	
Praeaulacus subrhombeus	Sp. nov	Valid	Li, Shih & Ren	Middle Jurassic	Jiulongshan Formation	China	A praeaulacid evanioid, a species of Praeaulacus.	
Praeaulacus tenellus	Sp. nov	Valid	Li, Shih & Ren	Middle Jurassic	Jiulongshan Formation	China	A praeaulacid evanioid, a species of Praeaulacus.	
Proapocritus bialatus	Sp. nov	Valid	Li, Shih & Ren	Middle Jurassic	Jiulongshan Formation	China	An ephialtitid wasp, a species of Proapocritus.	
Procleptes eoliami	Sp. nov	Valid	McKellar & Engel	Late Cretaceous (Campanian)		Canada	A cuckoo wasp, a species of Procleptes.	
Procleptes hopejohnsonae	Sp. nov	Valid	McKellar & Engel	Late Cretaceous (Campanian)		Canada	A cuckoo wasp, a species of Procleptes.	
Procretevania mitis	Sp. nov	Valid	Li, Shih & Ren	Early Cretaceous	Yixian Formation	China	A wasp belonging to the group Evanioidea. Originally described as a species of Procretevania, but subsequently transferred to the genus Cretevania by Li et al. (2018).	
Proterosceliopsis	Gen. et sp. nov	Valid	Ortega-Blanco, McKellar & Engel.	Early Cretaceous (Albian)	Escucha Formation	Spain	A member of Platygastroidea. The type species is P. masneri.	P. ambulata, species described in 2019
Protohabropoda	Gen. et sp. nov	Valid	Dehon & Engel in Dehon et al.	Late Oligocene	calcaire de Campagne Calavon	France	An apid bee. Type speciesP. pauli	Protohabropoda pauli
Protopolistes	Gen. et comb. nov	Valid	Antropov in Antropov et al.	Late Eocene	Bembridge Marls	Isle of Wight	A member of Vespidae belonging to the subfamily Polistinae; a new genus for "Polybia" oblita Cockerell (1921).	
Protosceliphron	Gen. et comb. nov	Valid	Antropov in Antropov et al.	Late Eocene	Bembridge Marls	Isle of Wight	A member of the family Sphecidae belonging to the subfamily Sceliphrinae; a new genus for "Sceliphron" brevior Cockerell (1921).	
Pseudodryinus burmensis	Sp. nov	Valid	Olmi, Xu & Guglielmino	Late Cretaceous (early Cenomanian)	Burmese amber	Myanmar	A member of Dryinidae found in Burmese amber, a species of Pseudodryinus.	
Rectilyda	Gen. et sp. nov	Valid	Wang et al.	Early Cretaceous	Yixian Formation	China	A xyelydid sawfly. The type species is Rectilyda sticta.	
Rhyssalus bruesi	Sp. nov	Valid	Belokobylskij in Antropov et al.	Late Eocene	Bembridge Marls	Isle of Wight	A member of Braconidae belonging to the subfamily Rhyssalinae.	
Rovnoeucoila	Gen. et sp. nov	Valid	Buffington & Perkovsky in Buffington, Perkovsky & Brady	Eocene		Ukraine	A eucoiline figitid wasp found in Rovno amber. The type species is Rovnoeucoila tympanomorpha.	
Samarkandykia	Gen. et 2 sp. nov	Valid	Kopylov	Triassic	Madygen Formation	Kyrgyzstan	A madygelline xyelid sawfly. Genus contains two species: S. ryzhkovae and S. shmakovi.	
Scabolyda	Gen. et 2 sp. nov	Valid	Wang et al.	Middle Jurassic to Early Cretaceous	Jiulongshan Formation; Yixian Formation	China	A juralydine pamphiliid. Genus contains two species: Scabolyda orientalis and Scabolyda incompleta.	
"Scambus" fossilis	Sp. nov	Valid	Khalaim in Antropov et al.	Late Eocene	Bembridge Marls	Isle of Wight	A member of Ichneumonidae belonging to the subfamily Pimplinae.	
Semionis wightensis	Sp. nov	Valid	Belokobylskij in Antropov et al.	Late Eocene	Bembridge Marls	Isle of Wight	A member of Braconidae belonging to the subfamily Microgastrinae.	
Serphites fannyae	Sp. nov	Valid	Engel & Perrichot	Late Cretaceous (middle Cenomanian to early Santonian, 97–85 Ma)		France	A serphitid wasp, a species of Serphites.	
Sierola rovniana	Sp. nov	Valid	Ramos & Azevedo in Ramos et al.	Eocene		Ukraine	A bethylid wasp found in Rovno amber, a species of Sierola.	
Sphaerancistrocerus	Gen. et sp. nov	Valid	Antropov in Antropov et al.	Late Eocene	Bembridge Marls	Isle of Wight	A potter wasp. The type species is S. petiolatus.	
Sphecomyrmodes contegus	Sp. nov	jr synonym	Barden & Grimaldi	Earliest Cenomanian	Burmese amber	Myanmar	A stem group ant. jr synonym of Gerontoformica contegus.	Gerontoformica contegus
Sphecomyrmodes gracilis	Sp. nov	jr synonym	Barden & Grimaldi	Earliest Cenomanian	Burmese amber	Myanmar	A stem group ant. jr synonym of Gerontoformica gracilis	Gerontoformica gracilis
Sphecomyrmodes magnus	Sp. nov	jr synonym	Barden & Grimaldi	Earliest Cenomanian	Burmese amber	Myanmar	A stem group ant. jr synonym of Gerontoformica magnus.	Gerontoformica magnus
Sphecomyrmodes pilosus	Sp. nov	jr synonym	Barden & Grimaldi	Earliest Cenomanian	Burmese amber	Myanmar	A stem group ant. jr synonym of Gerontoformica pilosus.	Gerontoformica pilosus
Sphecomyrmodes robustus	Sp. nov	jr synonym	Barden & Grimaldi	Earliest Cenomanian	Burmese amber	Myanmar	A stem group ant. jr synonym of Gerontoformica robustus.	Gerontoformica robustus
Sphecomyrmodes rugosus	Sp. nov	jr synonym	Barden & Grimaldi	Earliest Cenomanian	Burmese amber	Myanmar	A stem group ant. jr synonym of Gerontoformica rugosus.	Gerontoformica rugusus
Sphecomyrmodes spiralis	Sp. nov	jr synonym	Barden & Grimaldi	Earliest Cenomanian	Burmese amber	Myanmar	A stem group ant. jr synonym of Gerontoformica spiralis.	Gerontoformica spiralis
Sphecomyrmodes subcuspis	Sp. nov	jr synonym	Barden & Grimaldi	Earliest Cenomanian	Burmese amber	Myanmar	A stem group ant. jr synonym of Gerontoformica subcuspis.	Gerontoformica subcuspis
Sphecomyrmodes tendir	Sp. nov	jr synonym	Barden & Grimaldi	Earliest Cenomanian	Burmese amber	Myanmar	A stem group ant. jr synonym of Gerontoformica tendir.	Gerontoformica tendir
Taphopone	Gen. et comb. et 4 sp. nov	Valid	Dlussky & Perfilieva in Antropov et al.	Late Eocene to Miocene	Bembridge Marls	Isle of Wight; Russia	A morphogenus of ponerine ants. The type species is "Ponerites" karaganensis Dlussky (1981); genus also includes "Ponerites" stauropolitanus Dlussky (1981), as well as new species T. aberrans, T. macroptera, T. microptera and T. petrosa.	
Tithonoscelio	Gen. et sp. nov	Valid	Ortega-Blanco, McKellar & Engel.	Early Cretaceous (Albian)	Escucha Formation	Spain	A member of Scelionidae. The type species is T. resinalis.	
Tytthopsen	Gen. et sp. nov	Valid	Antropov in Antropov et al.	Late Eocene	Bembridge Marls	Isle of Wight	A member of the family Crabronidae belonging to the subfamily Pemphredoninae. The type species is T. nanus.	
Usomyrma	Gen. et sp. nov	Valid	Dlussky, Radchenko & Dubovikoff	Late Eocene		Denmark	A dolichoderine ant. The type species is Usomyrma mirabilis.	Usomyrma mirabilis
Xoanon? eocenicus	Sp. nov	Valid	Wedmann, Pouillon & Nel	Eocene	Messel pit	Germany	A horntail, possibly a species of ''Xoanon.	
Zigrasimecia ferox	Sp. nov	Valid	Perrichot	Cretaceous (99 Mya)	Burmese amber	Myanmar	A sphecomyrmine ant found in Burmese amber, a species of Zigrasimecia.	Zigrasimecia ferox

== Clade Neuropterida ==
=== Neuroptera ===
Name	Novelty	Status	Authors	Age	Unit	Location	Notes	Images
Abrigramma	Gen. et sp. nov	Valid	Yang et al.	Early Cretaceous	Yixian Formation	China	A kalligrammatid neuropteran. The type species is Abrigramma calophleba.	Abrigramma calophleba
Affinigramma	Gen. et sp. nov	Valid	Yang et al.	Middle Jurassic	Jiulongshan Formation	China	A kalligrammatid neuropteran. Type species is A. myrioneura.	Affinigramma myrioneura
Ainigmapsychops	Gen. et sp. nov	Valid	Makarkin & Archibald	Early Eocene (Ypresian)	Tom Thumb Tuff Member of the Klondike Mountain Formation	United States	A neuropteran of uncertain phylogenetic placement, possibly a member of Psychopsidae. Type species is Ainigmapsychops inexspectatus.	Ainigmapsychops inexspectatus
Arbusella	Gen. et sp. nov	Valid	Khramov	Late Jurassic		Kazakhstan	A kempynine osmylid. Type species is Arbusella bella.	
Archaeosmylidia	Gen. et sp. nov	Valid	Makarkin, Yang and Ren	Bathonian	Jiulongshan Formation	China	An osmylid. Type species is Archaeosmylidia fusca.	
Asiachrysa	Gen. et sp. nov	Valid	Makarkin	Eocene	Tadushi Formation	Russia	A green lacewing belonging to the subfamily Nothochrysinae. The type species is Asiachrysa tadushiella.	
Daohugosmylus	Gen. et sp. nov	Valid	Liu et al.	Middle Jurassic	Daohugou Beds	China	A saucrosmylid neuropteran. Type species is Daohugosmylus castus.	
Dimidiosmylus	Gen. et sp. nov	Valid	Khramov in Ponomarenko et al.	Late Jurassic		Mongolia	A member of Neuroptera of uncertain phylogenetic placement. The type species is Dimidiosmylus ramosus.	
Elektrithone	Gen. et sp. nov	Valid	Makarkin, Wedmann, and Weiterschan	Eocene	Baltic amber	Europe	An ithonid neuropteran . Type species is Elektrithone expectata.	Elektrithone expectata
Ensiosmylus	Gen. et sp. nov	Valid	Khramov	Late Jurassic		Kazakhstan	A spilosmyline osmylid. Type species is Ensiosmylus acutus.	
Erlikosmylus	Gen. et sp. nov	Valid	Khramov	Early or Middle Jurassic	Sogul Formation	Kyrgyzstan	A member of the family Osmylidae. The type species is E. obscurus.	
Frustumopsychops	Gen. et sp. nov	Valid	Khramov in Ponomarenko et al.	Late Jurassic		Mongolia	A member of Polystoechotidae. The type species is Frustumopsychops pectinatus.	
Garnaconis	Gen. et sp. nov	Valid	Perrichot & Nel in Perrichot et al.	Late Cretaceous (middle Cenomanian to early Santonian, 97–85 Ma)		France	A coniopterygid tentatively placed in the subfamily Aleuropteryginae. The type species is Garnaconis dupeorum.	
Gayndahpsychops	Gen. et sp. nov	Valid	Lambkin	Early Middle Triassic	Gayndah Formation	Australia	An osmylopsycopid psychopsoid. Type species is Gayndahpsychops carsburgi.	
Ithigramma	Gen. et sp. nov	Valid	Yang et al.	Early Cretaceous	Yixian Formation	China	A kalligrammatid neuropteran. The type species is Ithigramma multinervia.	Ithigramma multinervia
Jurakempynus arcanus	Sp. nov	Valid	Khramov	Late Jurassic		Kazakhstan	A kempynine osmylid, a species of Jurakempynus.	
Jurakempynus sublimis	Sp. nov	Valid	Khramov	Late Jurassic		Mongolia	A kempynine osmylid, a species of Jurakempynus.	
Jurosmylus parvulus	Sp. nov	Valid	Khramov	Late Jurassic		Kazakhstan	A protosmyline osmylid, a species of Jurosmylus.	
Kalligramma albifasciatum	Sp. nov	Valid	Yang, Makarkin and Ren	Middle Jurassic	Daohugou Beds	China	A kalligrammatid neuropteran, a species of Kalligramma.	Kalligramma albifasciatum
Kalligramma brachyrhyncha	Sp. nov	Valid	Yang et al.	Middle Jurassic	Jiulongshan Formation	China	A kalligrammatid neuropteran, a species of Kalligramma.	
Kalligramma circularia	Sp. nov	Valid	Yang et al.	Middle Jurassic	Jiulongshan Formation	China	A kalligrammatid neuropteran, a species of Kalligramma.	Kalligramma circularia
Kalligramma elegans	Sp. nov	Valid	Yang, Makarkin and Ren	Middle Jurassic	Daohugou Beds	China	A kalligrammatid neuropteran, a species of Kalligramma.	
Kallihemerobius aciedentatus	Sp. nov	Valid	Yang et al.	Middle Jurassic	Jiulongshan Formation	China	A kalligrammatid neuropteran, a species of Kallihemerobius.	
Kallihemerobius almacellus	Sp. nov	Valid	Yang et al.	Middle Jurassic	Jiulongshan Formation	China	A kalligrammatid neuropteran, a species of Kallihemerobius.	
Kallihemerobius feroculus	Sp. nov	Valid	Yang et al.	Middle Jurassic	Jiulongshan Formation	China	A kalligrammatid neuropteran, a species of Kallihemerobius.	Kallihemerobius feroculus
Kempynosmylus	Gen. et sp. nov	Valid	Makarkin	Early Cretaceous		Russia	A kempynine osmylid. The type species is Kempynosmylus zherikhini.	
Kolbasinella	Gen. et sp. nov	Valid	Khramov	Late Jurassic		Kazakhstan	A gumilline osmylid. Type species is Kolbasinella elongata.	
Mesosmylina angusta	Sp. nov	Valid	Khramov	Early or Middle Jurassic	Sogul Formation	Kyrgyzstan	A member of the family Osmylidae.	
Mesosmylina shurabica	Sp. nov	Valid	Khramov	Early or Middle Jurassic	Sogul Formation	Kyrgyzstan	A member of the family Osmylidae.	
Oregramma aureolusa	Sp. nov	Valid	Yang et al.	Early Cretaceous	Yixian Formation	China	A kalligrammatid neuropteran, a species of Oregramma.	Oregramma aureolusa
Oregramma illecebrosa	Sp. nov	Valid	Yang et al.	Early Cretaceous	Yixian Formation	China	A kalligrammatid neuropteran, a species of Oregramma.	Oregramma illecebrosa
Sauktangida	Gen. et sp. nov	Valid	Khramov	Early or Middle Jurassic		Kyrgyzstan	A member of the family Osmylidae. The type species is S. aenigmatica.	
Sophogramma pingquanica	Sp. nov	Valid	Yang et al.	Early Cretaceous	Yixian Formation	China	A kalligrammatid neuropteran, a species of Sophogramma.	
Stelligramma	Gen. et sp. nov	Valid	Yang et al.	Middle Jurassic	Jiulongshan Formation	China	A kalligrammatid neuropteran. The type species is Stelligramma allochroma.	
Tengriosmylus	Gen. et sp. nov	Valid	Khramov	Early or Middle Jurassic	Sogul Formation	Kyrgyzstan	A member of the family Osmylidae. The type species is T. magnificus.	

=== Raphidioptera ===
Name	Novelty	Status	Authors	Age	Unit	Location	Notes	Images
Archiraphidia	Gen et comb rev	Valid	(Handlirsch)	Late Eocene	Florissant Formation	United States	A Raphidiid snakefly The type species is Inocellia tumulata (1890) also includes Inocellia somnolenta (1890); Raphidia tranquilla (1890)	Archiraphidia tumulata
Dictyoraphidia veterana	Gen et comb rev	Valid	(Scudder)	Late Eocene	Florissant Formation	United States	A baissopterid snakefly Moved from Raphidia veterana (1990)	
Fibla exusta	Comb nov	Valid	(Cockerell & Custer)	Late Eocene	Florissant Formation	United States	An inocelliid snakefly Moved from Inocellia exusta (1925)	Fibla exusta
Florissantoraphidia	Gen. et comb. nov	Valid	Makarkin & Archibald	Late Eocene	Florissant Formation	United States	A raphidiid snakefly. The type species is Raphidia funerata (2003); Also includes Raphidia mortua (1909).	Florissantoraphidia mortua
Juroraphidia	Gen. et sp. nov	Valid	Liu, Ren & Yang	Middle Jurassic	Jiulongshan Formation	China	A snakefly. The type species is J. longicollum.	Juroraphidia longicollum
Megaraphidia	Gen et sp res, sp comb nov	valid	(Cockerell)	Eocene; Priabonian	Florissant Formation	USA; Colorado	A raphidiid snakefly The type species is Raphidia exhumata (1909); Also includes Raphidia elegans (1936); Raphidia pulveris (1914) synonymized to R. exhumata.	Megaraphidia exhumata

== Odonata ==
Name	Novelty	Status	Authors	Age	Unit	Location	Notes	Images
Anglogomphaeschna	Gen. et sp. nov	Valid	Nel & Fleck	Late Eocene		United Kingdom	A dragonfly related to the genus Gomphaeschna. The type species is Anglogomphaeschna eocenica.	
Anglohypolestes	Gen. et sp. nov	Valid	Nel & Fleck	Late Eocene		United Kingdom	A damselfly related to the genus Hypolestes. The type species is Anglohypolestes fasciata.	
Angloprotoneura	Gen. et sp. nov	Valid	Nel & Fleck	Late Eocene		United Kingdom	A protoneurid damselfly. The type species is Angloprotoneura emilielacroixi.	
Enteropia	Gen. et sp. nov	Valid	Pritykina & Vassilenko in Ponomarenko et al.	Late Jurassic		Mongolia	A damselfly related to Hemiphlebia mirabilis. The type species is Enteropia mongolica.	
Eohypolestes	Gen. et sp. nov	Valid	Nel & Fleck	Late Eocene		United Kingdom	A damselfly related to the genus Hypolestes. The type species is Eohypolestes hooleyi.	
Eolestes ramosus	Sp. nov	Valid	Greenwalt & Bechly	Eocene	Kishenehn Formation	United States	An eolestid damselfly, a species of Eolestes.	
Eomacrodiplax	Gen. et sp. nov	Valid	Nel & Fleck	Late Eocene		United Kingdom	A dragonfly related to the genus Urothemis. The type species is Eomacrodiplax incompleta.	
Juraheterophlebia sinica	Sp. nov	Valid	Nel, Azar & Huang	Middle Jurassic		China	A member of Odonata and Heterophlebioptera, a species of Juraheterophlebia.	
Lestes dianacompteae	Sp. nov	Valid	Compte-Sart	Miocene		Spain	A damselfly, a species of Lestes.	
Lutetialestes	Gen. et sp. nov	Valid	Greenwalt & Bechly	Eocene	Kishenehn Formation	United States	A damselfly related to the family Lestidae. The type species is Lutetialestes uniformis.	
Mongolothemis	Gen. et sp. nov	Junior synonym	Pritykina & Vassilenko in Ponomarenko et al.	Late Jurassic		Mongolia	The type species is Mongolothemis gobicus. Originally described as member of Euthemistidae. Vassilenko & Pritykina (2019) found it to be an objective synonym of Paragonophlebia patriciae Nel (2009).	
Neophya legrandi	Sp. nov	Valid	Nel & Fleck	Late Eocene		United Kingdom	A dragonfly related to the genus Cordulephya, a species of Neophya.	
Oligaeschna wedmanni	Sp. nov	Valid	Nel & Fleck	Late Eocene		United Kingdom	An aeshnid dragonfly, a species of Oligaeschna.	
Pantelusa	Gen. et sp. nov	Valid	Vassilenko	Late Cretaceous (Turonian)	Ora Formation	Israel	A damselfly related to Hemiphlebia mirabilis. The type species is Pantelusa krassilovi.	

== Other insects ==
Name	Novelty	Status	Authors	Age	Unit	Location	Notes	Images
Aviocladus	Gen. et sp. nov	Valid	Prokop, Roques & Nel	Carboniferous (Moscovian)		France	A member of Cnemidolestida/Cnemidolestodea. The type species is Aviocladus pectinatus.	
Aviogramma	Gen. et sp. nov	Valid	Prokop, Roques & Nel	Carboniferous (Moscovian)		France	A member of Caloneurodea. The type species is Aviogramma gracilis.	
Blattokhosara	Gen. et comb. nov	Valid	Storozhenko & Aristov	Permian (Kazanian)		Russia	A member of Grylloblattida/Eoblattida belonging to the family Megakhosaridae. The type species is "Megakhosarina" minuscula Aristov (2008).	
Cretophasmomima melanogramma	Sp. nov	Valid	Wang, Béthoux & Ren in Wang et al.	Early Cretaceous (126±4 mya)	Yixian Formation	China	A susumanioid phasmatodean of uncertain phylogenetic placement, a species of Cretophasmomima.	C. melanogramma
Jacquesoudardia	Gen. et sp. nov	Valid	Prokop, Roques & Nel	Carboniferous (Moscovian)		France	A member of Odonatoptera. The type species is Jacquesoudardia magnifica.	
Kamamica	Gen. et sp. nov	Valid	Aristov & Rasnitsyn	Early Permian	Solikamsk Formation	Russia	A member of Eoblattida. The type species is Kamamica promota.	
Lophiosina	Gen. et sp. nov	Valid	Nel et al.	Middle Jurassic	Daohugou Beds	China	A lophioneuridan paraneopteran (a relative of thrips). The type species is Lophiosina lini.	
Mesoidelia procera	Sp. nov	Valid	Aristov	Late Permian		Russia	A member of Grylloblattida/Eoblattida belonging to the family Mesorthopteridae, a species of Mesoidelia.	
Mesoidelia riphaea	Sp. nov	Valid	Aristov	Late Permian		Russia	A member of Grylloblattida/Eoblattida belonging to the family Mesorthopteridae, a species of Mesoidelia.	
Mesopsocoides	Gen. et sp. nov	Valid	Azar, Nel & Perrichot	Late Cretaceous (middle Cenomanian to early Santonian, 97–85 Ma)		France	A mesopsocid psocomorph psocopteran. The type species is Mesopsocoides dupei.	
Metretopus dividus	Sp. nov	Valid	Staniczek & Godunko	Eocene		Europe	A metretopodid mayfly found in Baltic amber, a species of Metretopus.	
Parastenaropodites aquilonius	Sp. nov	Valid	Aristov	Middle Permian		Russia	A member of Grylloblattida/Eoblattida belonging to the family Mesorthopteridae, a species of Parastenaropodites.	
Parastenaropodites circumhumatus	Sp. nov	Valid	Aristov	Late Permian		Russia	A member of Grylloblattida/Eoblattida belonging to the family Mesorthopteridae, a species of Parastenaropodites.	
Parastenaropodites exossis	Sp. nov	Valid	Aristov	Late Permian		Russia	A member of Grylloblattida/Eoblattida belonging to the family Mesorthopteridae, a species of Parastenaropodites.	
Parastenaropodites pannea	Sp. nov	Valid	Aristov	Late Permian		Russia	A member of Grylloblattida/Eoblattida belonging to the family Mesorthopteridae, a species of Parastenaropodites.	
Permoponopterix	Gen. et sp. nov	Valid	Nel, Prokop & Kirejtshuk in Nel et al.	Middle Permian (Guadalupian)	Salagou Formation	France	Described as a ponopterixid cockroach, later studies questioned attribution to the group. Type species is Permoponopterix lodevensis.	
Permorthopteron	Gen. et sp. nov	Valid	Aristov	Late Permian		Russia	A member of Grylloblattida/Eoblattida belonging to the family Mesorthopteridae. The type species is Permorthopteron foliaceus.	
Proprionoglaris axioperierga	Sp. nov	Valid	Azar, Nel & Perrichot	Late Cretaceous (middle Cenomanian to early Santonian)		France	An archaeatropid trogiomorph psocopteran, a species of Proprionoglaris.	
Pseudopulex tanlan	Sp. nov	Valid	Gao, Shih, Rasnitsyn & Ren in Gao et al.	Early Cretaceous	Yixian Formation	China	A pseudopulicid flea, a species of Pseudopulex.	P. tanlan
Scocompus	Gen. et sp. nov	Valid	Azar, Nel & Perrichot	Late Cretaceous (middle Cenomanian to early Santonian, 97–85 Ma)		France	A troctomorph psocopteran belonging to the group Amphientometae of uncertain phylogenetic placement. The type species is Scocompus atelisus.	
Spilaptera splendens	Sp. nov	Valid	Prokop, Roques & Nel	Carboniferous (Moscovian)		France	A member of Palaeodictyoptera, a species of Spilaptera.	
Toxolabis	Gen. et sp. nov	Valid	Engel & Grimaldi	Cretaceous; Cenomanian	Burmese amber	Myanmar	An earwig. Type species is Toxolabis zigrasi.	
Troctopsocoides gracilis	Sp. nov	Valid	Mockford & Aldrete	Probably Miocene		Dominican Republic	A troctopsocid psocopteran found in Dominican amber, a species of Troctopsocoides.	
Tshermyaninus	Gen. et sp. nov	Valid	Aristov	Late Permian		Russia	A member of Grylloblattida/Eoblattida belonging to the family Mesorthopteridae. The type species is Tshermyaninus biforis.	
Undacypha bournieri	Sp. nov	Valid	Nel et al.	Middle Jurassic	Daohugou Beds	China	A lophioneuridan paraneopteran (a relative of thrips), a species of Undacypha.	
Undacypha kreiteri	Sp. nov	Valid	Nel et al.	Middle Jurassic	Daohugou Beds	China	A lophioneuridan paraneopteran (a relative of thrips), a species of Undacypha.	
Vendeenympha	Gen. et sp. nov	Valid	Engel & Perrichot	Late Cretaceous (middle Cenomanian to early Santonian)		France	An earwig. The type species is Vendeenympha gravesi.	
Zigrasolabis	Gen. et sp. nov	Valid	Engel & Grimaldi	Cretaceous; Cenomanian	Burmese amber	Myanmar	An earwig. Type species is Zigrasolabis speciosa.	
