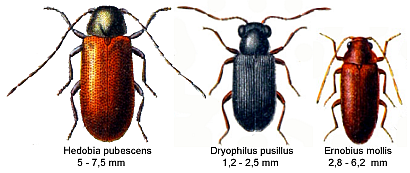

Scientific classification
- Kingdom: Animalia
- Phylum: Arthropoda
- Clade: Pancrustacea
- Class: Insecta
- Order: Coleoptera
- Suborder: Polyphaga
- Family: Ptinidae
- Subfamily: Dryophilinae; LeConte, 1861

= Dryophilinae =

Subfamily of beetles

Dryophilinae is a subfamily of death-watch and spider beetles in the family Ptinidae. There are at least six genera and two described species in Dryophilinae.

The subfamily Dryophilinae, along with Anobiinae and several others, were formerly considered members of the family Anobiidae, the but family name has since been changed to Ptinidae.

== Genera ==
These six genera belong to the subfamily Dryophilinae:

- Dryophilus Chevrolat, 1832^{g}
- Grynobius Thomson, 1859^{g}
- Homophthalmus Abeille de Perrin, 1875^{g}
- Neodryophilus Espaol & Belles, 1981^{g}
- Pseudodryophilus Heyden, 1891^{g}
- Ptilineurus Reitter, 1902-01^{i c g}

Data sources: i = ITIS, c = Catalogue of Life, g = GBIF, b = Bugguide.net
