= Apionion =

Scientific classification
- Domain: Eukaryota
- Kingdom: Animalia
- Phylum: Arthropoda
- Class: Insecta
- Order: Coleoptera
- Suborder: Polyphaga
- Infraorder: Cucujiformia
- Family: Brentidae
- Genus: Apionion

Genus of beetles

Apionion is a genus of beetles belonging to the family Brentidae.

The species of this genus are found in Central America.

Species:

- Apionion formoculus Poinar & Legalov, 2015
- Apionion formosus Poinar & Legalov, 2015
