= Xylolaemus sakhnovi =

Xylolaemus sakhnovi Temporal range: Eocene

Scientific classification
- Kingdom: Animalia
- Phylum: Arthropoda
- Clade: Pancrustacea
- Class: Insecta
- Order: Coleoptera
- Suborder: Polyphaga
- Infraorder: Cucujiformia
- Family: Zopheridae
- Genus: Xylolaemus
- Species: †X. sakhnovi

Binomial name
- †Xylolaemus sakhnovi Alekseev & Lord, 2014

Extinct species of beetle

Xylolaemus sakhnovi is an extinct species of cylindrical bark beetle in the family Zopheridae. The species is solely known from the Middle Eocene Baltic amber deposits in the Baltic Sea region of Europe. The genus Xylolaemus contains a total of six extant species distributed from western Europe through the Canary Islands and North Africa to India. The species is the first in the genus to be described from a fossil specimen.

== History and classification ==
Xylolaemus sakhnovi is known from a single fossil insect which is an inclusion in a transparent chunk of Baltic amber. The amber specimen contains the beetle imago along with a number of Quercus stellate hairs and a partial aphid. When the fossil was described it as part of a private collection, with the intent that it would be donated to the Paleontological Institute, Russian Academy of Science. The amber was recovered from fossil-bearing rocks in the Kaliningrad region of Russia. Estimates of the age date between 37 million years old, for the youngest sediments and 48 million years old. This age range straddles the middle Eocene, ranging from near the beginning of the Lutetian to the beginning of the Pribonian. The holotype was first studied by researchers Vitaly I. Alekseev of Kaliningrad State Technical University and Nathan P. Lord of Brigham Young University. Alekseev and Lord's 2014 type description of the species was published in the entomology journal Baltic Journal of Coleopterology. The specific epithet sakhnovi was coined as a patronym in honor of Nikolay I. Sakhnov, an entomologist and animal painter from the Kaliningrad region.

== Description ==
The holotype X. sakhnovi specimen is a mostly complete adult beetle, with the left legs, antennae, and pronotal region are all damaged, and the left half of the insect shows blackening (possibly from the amber having been processed with an autoclave). Overall the specimen has a body length of 3.2 millimetres (0.13 in) and has a width in the humeral region of 1.1 millimetres (0.043 in) being elongated and flattened in shape. In general, the coloration of the beetle was a uniform dark grey, with setae in some areas of the prosternum. The species is distinguished from extant Xylolaemus and at least one undescribed Baltic amber fossil in that the end segments of the antennae do not form a tight club; rather, they form a loose club and the tenth segments are the same size as the other segments. Also, X. sakhnovi is smaller overall, and the elytra do not have the patches of setae seen in the modern species.
