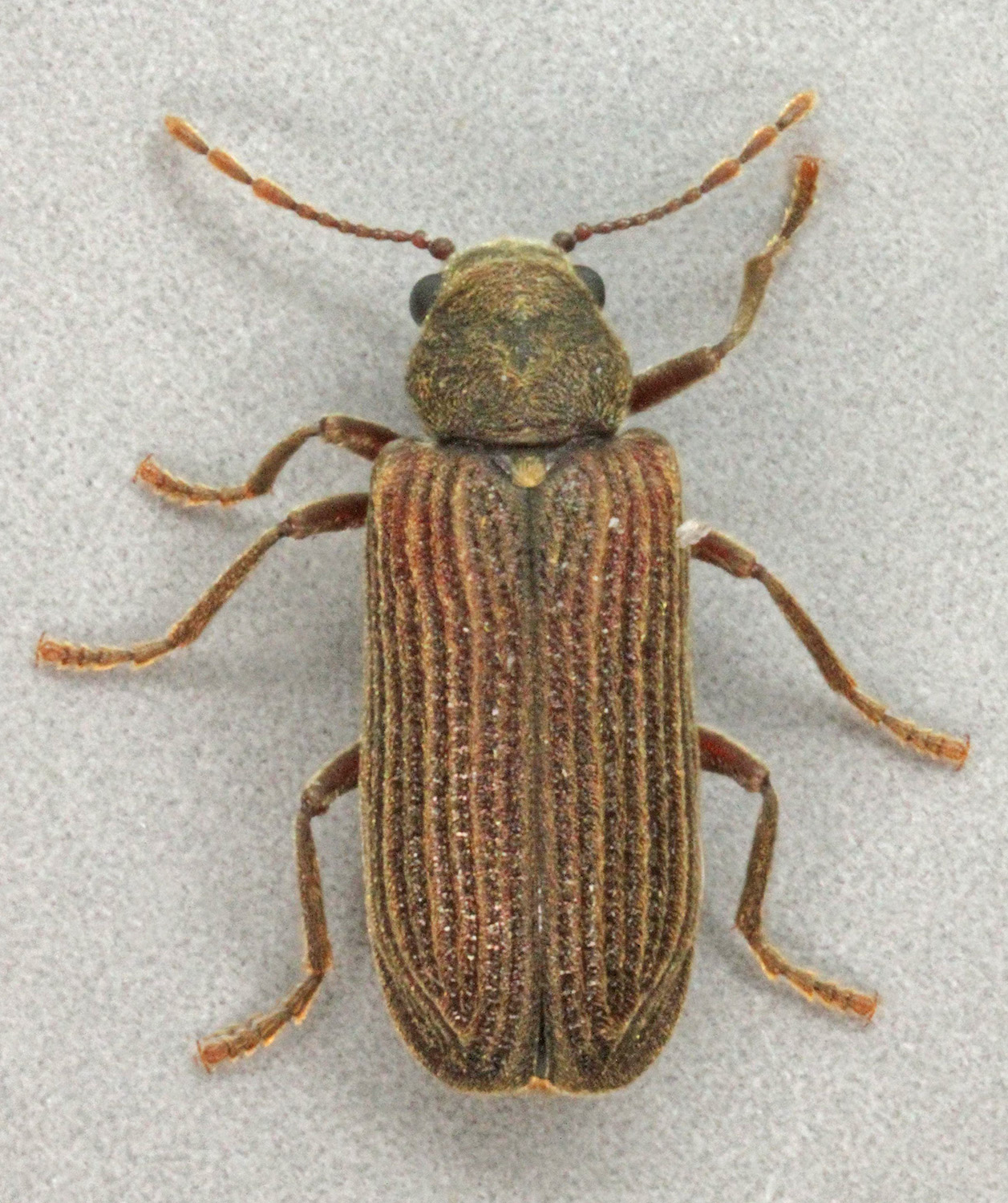
- Grynobius planus, North Wales

Scientific classification
- Kingdom: Animalia
- Phylum: Arthropoda
- Class: Insecta
- Order: Coleoptera
- Suborder: Polyphaga
- Family: Ptinidae
- Genus: Grynobius
- Species: G. planus

Binomial name
- Grynobius planus Thomson, 1859

= Grynobius =

Genus of beetles

Grynobius is a genus of beetles in the family Ptinidae. The genus contains a single species, Grynobius planus.

Its host plants include birch, alder, willow, hawthorn, and common beech.
