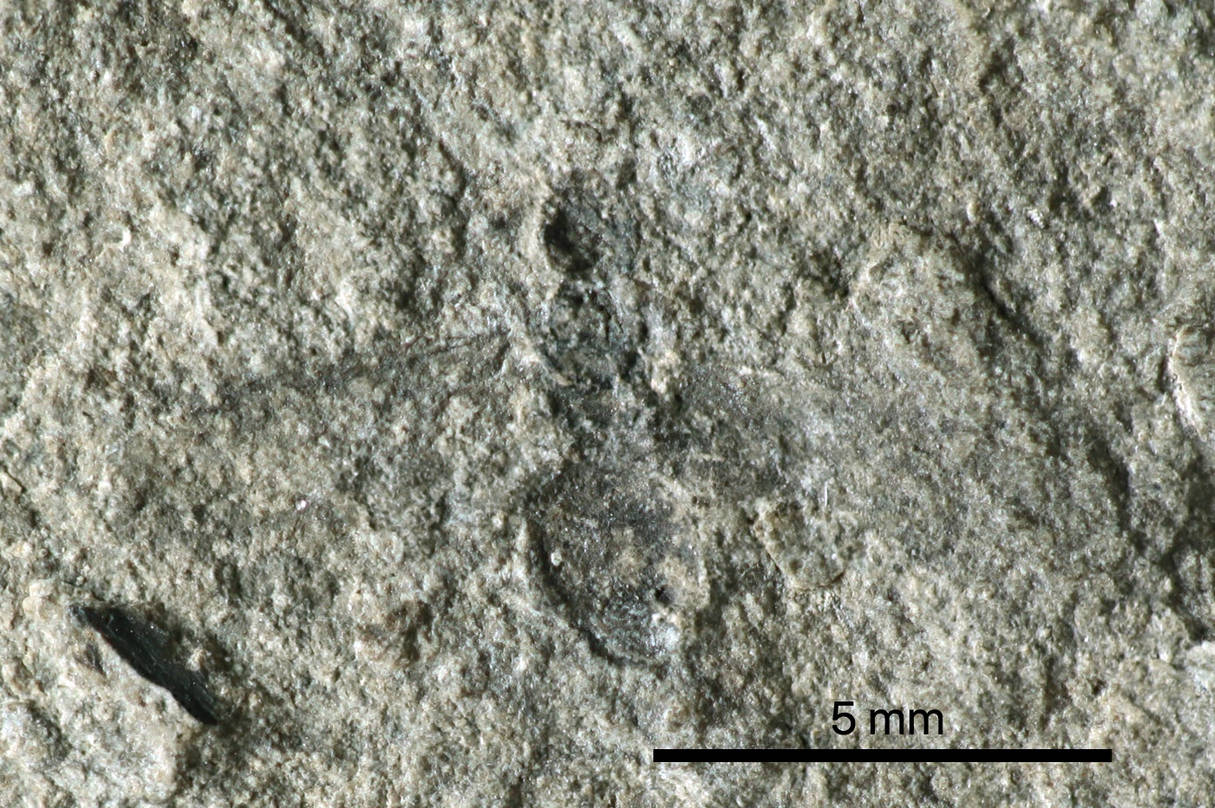
- Paratype queen

Scientific classification
- Kingdom: Animalia
- Phylum: Arthropoda
- Clade: Pancrustacea
- Class: Insecta
- Order: Hymenoptera
- Family: Formicidae
- Subfamily: Dolichoderinae
- Genus: Dolichoderus
- Species: †D. heeri

Binomial name
- †Dolichoderus heeri Dlussky & Putyatina, 2014

= Dolichoderus heeri =

Dolichoderus heeri Temporal range: Burdigalian

Species of ant

Dolichoderus heeri is a recently discovered extinct species of Miocene ant in the genus Dolichoderus. Described by Dlussky and Putyatina in 2014, the fossils were found in Radoboj in Croatia.
