= Dignomus =

Scientific classification
- Kingdom: Animalia
- Phylum: Arthropoda
- Class: Insecta
- Order: Coleoptera
- Suborder: Polyphaga
- Family: Ptinidae
- Genus: Dignomus; Wollaston, 1862

Genus of beetles

Dignomus is a genus of beetles belonging to the family Ptinidae.

The species of this genus are found in Europe and North America.

Species:

- Dignomus albipilis (Reitter, 1884)
- Dignomus aticus (Pic, 1902)
