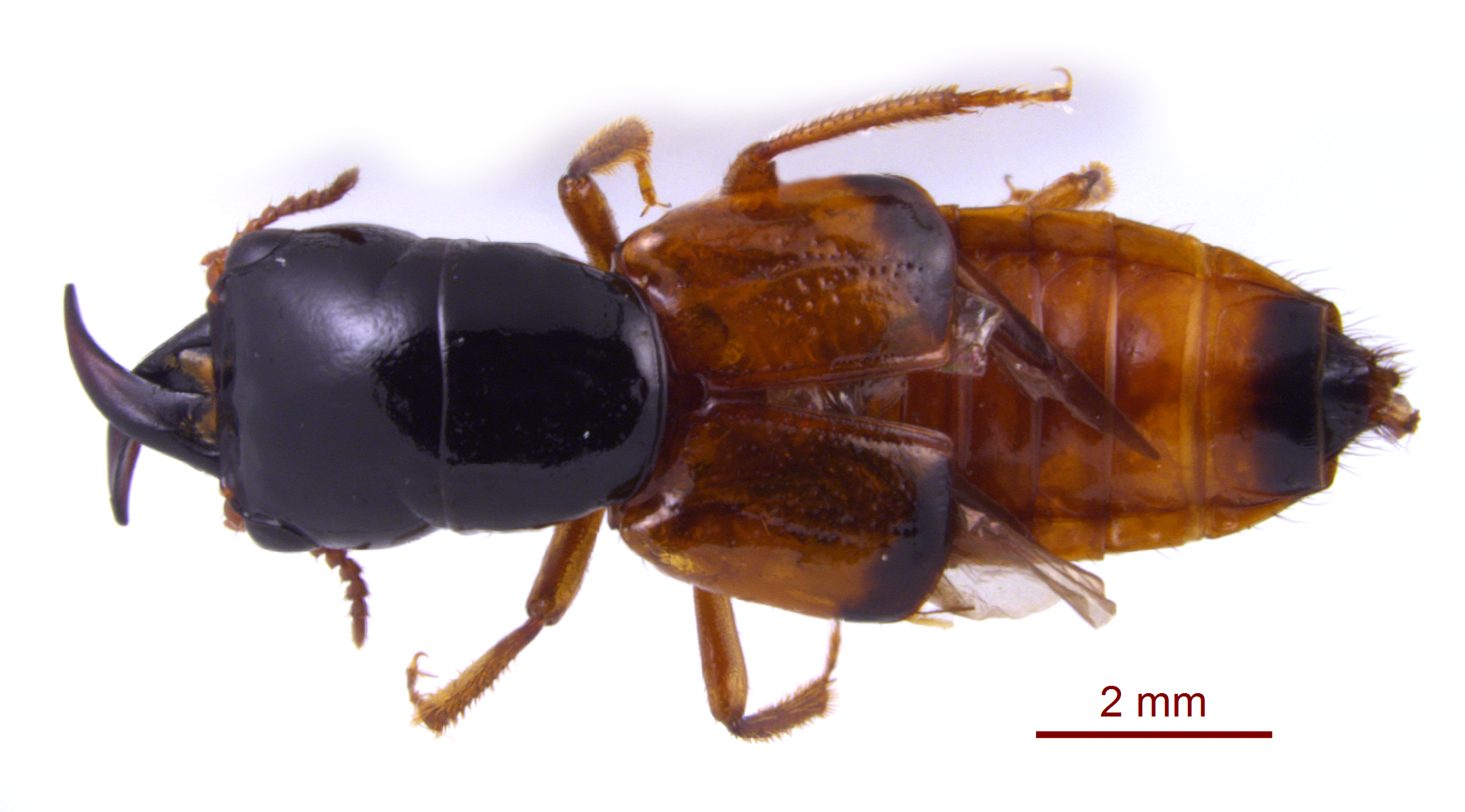
- Oxyporus mexicanus

Scientific classification
- Kingdom: Animalia
- Phylum: Arthropoda
- Class: Insecta
- Order: Coleoptera
- Suborder: Polyphaga
- Infraorder: Staphyliniformia
- Family: Staphylinidae
- Subfamily: Oxyporinae; Fleming, 1821

Genera
- †Cretoxyporus Cai, Chenyang & Diying Huang, 2014; Oxyporus Fabricius, 1775; †Protoxyporus Cai, Chenyang & Diying Huang, 2014; Pseudoxyporus Nakane & K. Sawada, 1956

= Oxyporinae =

Subfamily of beetles

The Oxyporinae are a subfamily of the Staphylinidae. One genus, Oxyporus, with 132 species, is found worldwide.

== Anatomy ==
All Oxyporinae have prominent mandibles. Their apical labial palpomeres are very large and strongly securiform. Their tarsi, like most Staphylinidae, are 5-5-5.

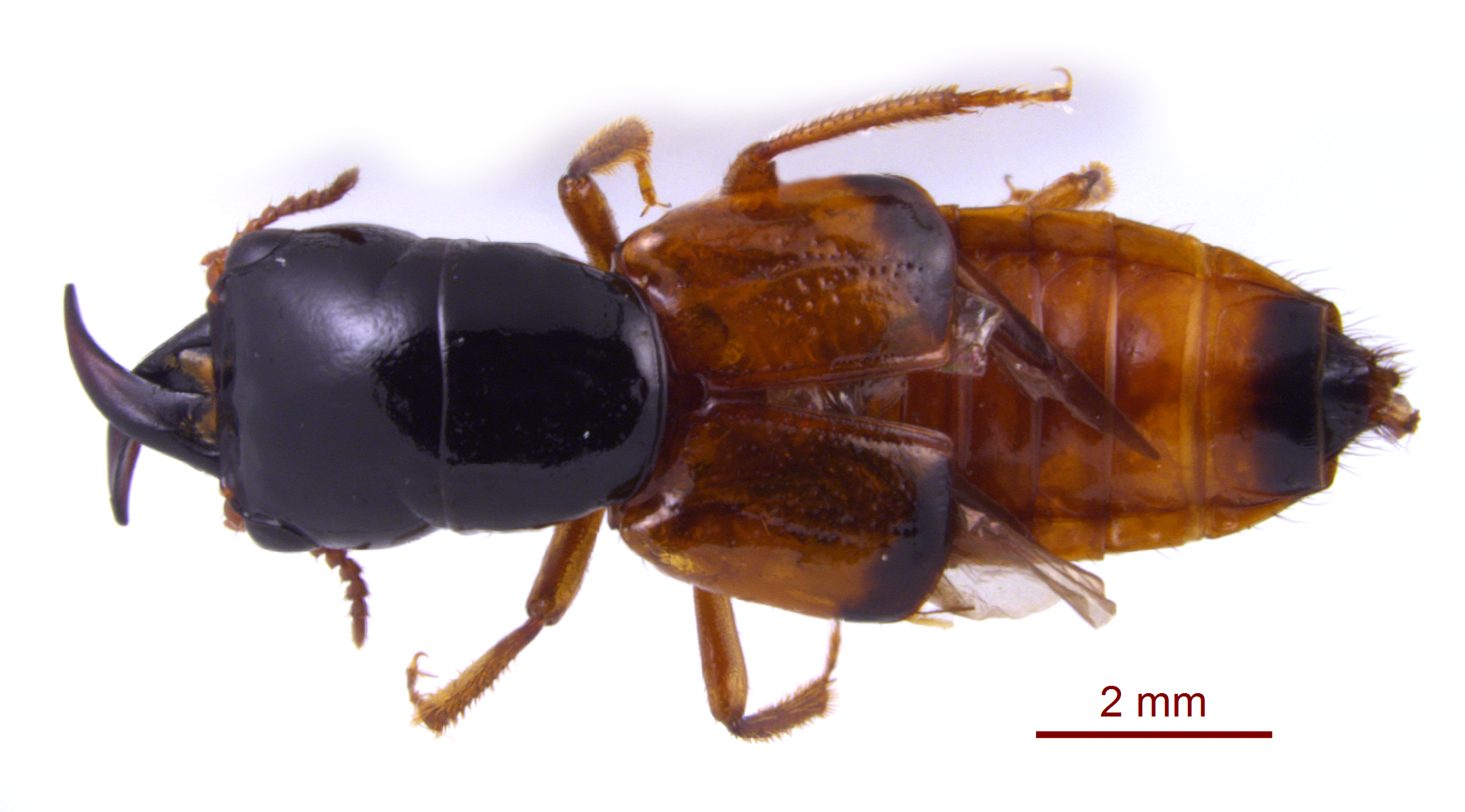
Oxyporus mexicanus

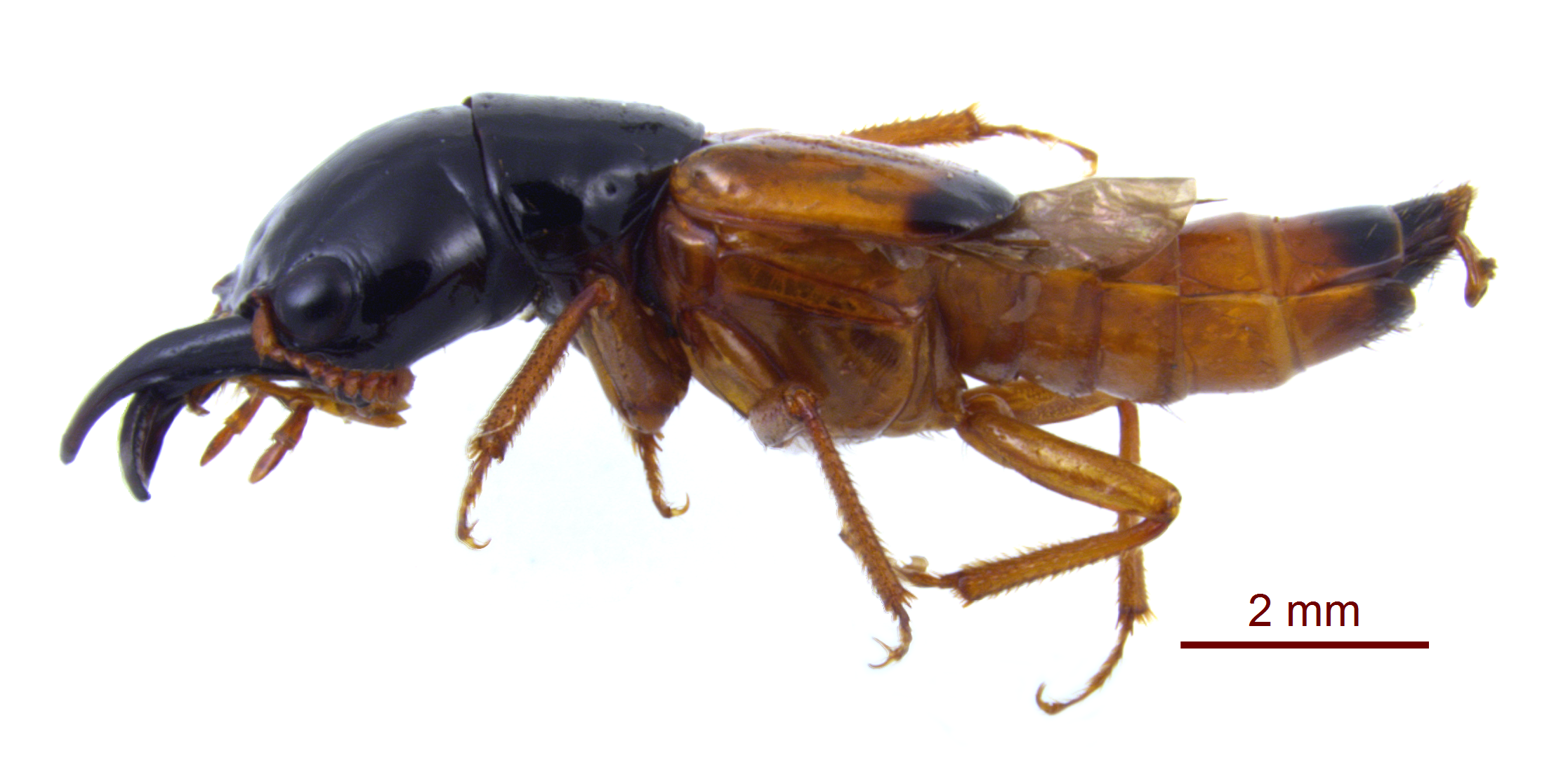
Oxyporus mexicanus

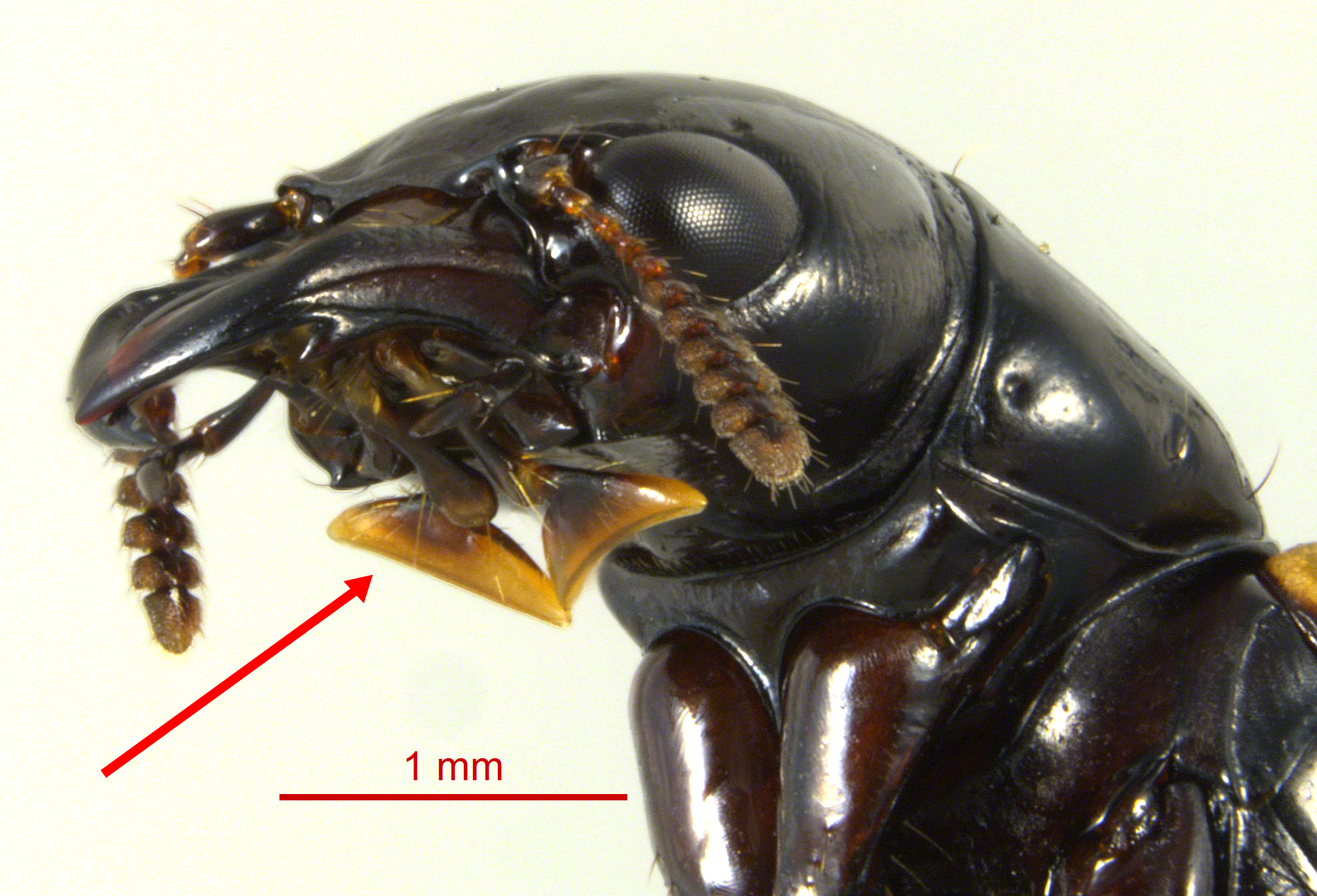
Oxyporus femoralis

== Ecology ==
Most Oxyporinae are fungivores. Their whole lifecycle involves fungi, as females construct egg-laying chambers in fungi and reproduce in them. Thus, most scientists inspect mushrooms and fleshy fungi to find these creatures.
