= Platycrossos =

Platycrossos Temporal range: 221.5–145.5 Ma

Scientific classification
- Kingdom: Animalia
- Phylum: Arthropoda
- Clade: Pancrustacea
- Class: Insecta
- Order: Coleoptera
- Suborder: †Protocoleoptera
- Family: †Permosynidae
- Genus: †Platycrossos; Dunstan, 1923

Species
- see text

Genus of beetles

Platycrossos is an extinct genus of protocoleopteran beetles in the family Permosynidae. It is known from the Triassic and Jurassic of Australia, Austria, Mongolia and Russia. Like other members of the family, the species of this genus were described from fossils of isolated elytra with punctate striae.

== Species ==
After:

- Platycrossos caroli Ponomarenko, 2011 – Lunz Formation, Austria, Late Triassic (Carnian)
- Platycrossos elongatus Ponomarenko, 1985 – Itat Formation, Russia, Middle Jurassic (Bajocian/Bathonian)
- Platycrossos latus Ponomarenko, 2014 – Sharteg Formation, Mongolia, Late Jurassic (Tithonian)
- Platycrossos ligulatus Dunstan, 1923 – Blackstone Formation, Australia, Late Triassic (Norian)
- Platycrossos longus Ponomarenko, 2014 – Sharteg Formation, Mongolia, Late Jurassic (Tithonian)
- Platycrossos loxonicus Ponomarenko, 2014 – Sharteg Formation, Mongolia, Late Jurassic (Tithonian)
- Platycrossos mongolicus Ponomarenko, 2014 – Sharteg Formation, Mongolia, Late Jurassic (Tithonian)
- Platycrossos ovum Ponomarenko, 2014 – Sharteg Formation, Mongolia, Late Jurassic (Tithonian)
- Platycrossos petalus Ponomarenko, 1985 – Itat Formation, Russia, Middle Jurassic (Bajocian/Bathonian)
- Platycrossos punctatus Ponomarenko, 1985 – Itat Formation, Russia, Middle Jurassic (Bajocian/Bathonian)
- Platycrossos subtumidus Dunstan, 1923 – Blackstone Formation, Australia, Late Triassic (Norian)
- Platycrossos tumidus (Tillyard, 1916) – Blackstone Formation, Australia, Late Triassic (Norian)
