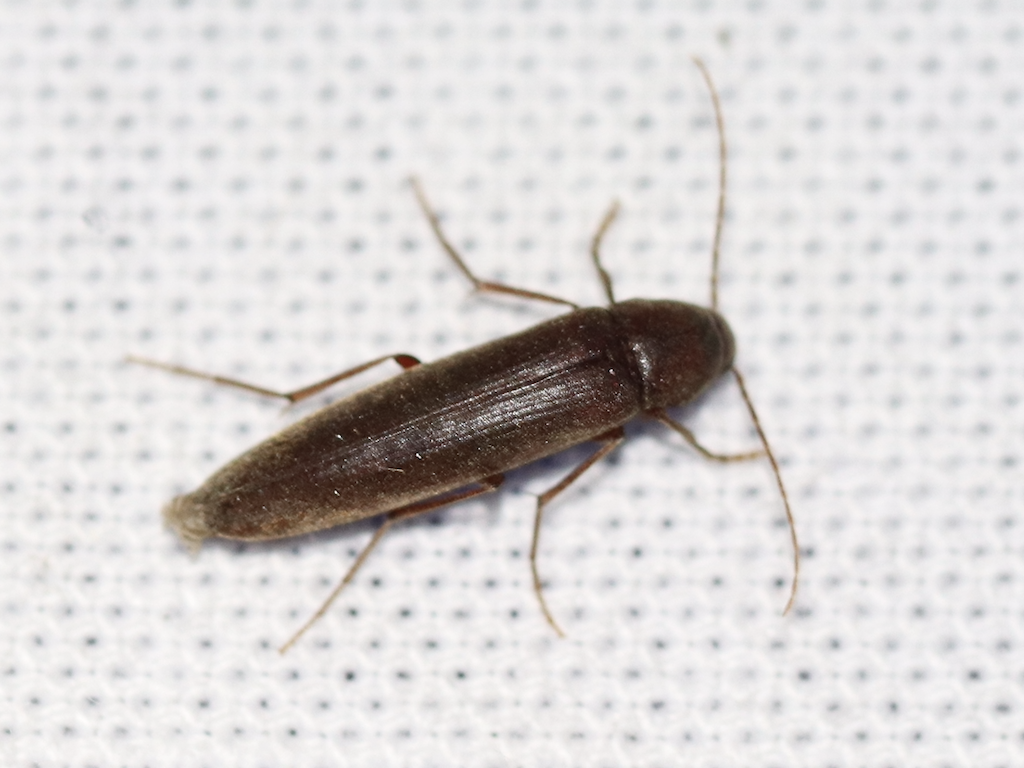
- Serropalpus substriatus

Scientific classification
- Domain: Eukaryota
- Kingdom: Animalia
- Phylum: Arthropoda
- Class: Insecta
- Order: Coleoptera
- Suborder: Polyphaga
- Infraorder: Cucujiformia
- Family: Melandryidae
- Genus: Serropalpus; Hellenius, 1786

= Serropalpus =

Genus of beetles

Serropalpus is a genus of beetles belonging to the family Melandryidae.

The species of this genus are found in Europe, Japan and America.

== Species ==
The following species are recognised in the genus Serropalpus:

- Serropalpus coxalis Mank, 1939
- Serropalpus ingemmescus Alekseev, 2014
- Serropalpus marseuli Nikitsky, 1992
- Serropalpus obsoletus Haldeman, 1848
- Serropalpus ryzhkovianus Alekseev, 2014
- Serropalpus substriatus Haldeman, 1848
- Serropalpus vivax Alekseev, 2014
