= List of Triassic lagerstätten =

Fossil sites from the Triassic period

The list of Triassic Lagerstätten is a documentation of Lagerstätte fossils sites around the world, dated to the Triassic period. These are characterized by exceptional preservation of fossil organisms, regularly including many well-preserved animals and their soft tissue remains. The extent of Lagerstätten deposits can range from a select site or stratigraphic layer to a whole formation or group.

== Criteria ==
Sites on the list must either:

1. Be referred to as a Lagerstätte within the main text of at least one scientific publication. Similar terms, such as 'exceptional preservation', do not qualify.
2. Have fossils that fulfill the criteria of Konservat-Lagerstätte as set within Kimmig & Schiffbauer (2024): Konservat-Lagerstätten are characterized by exceptional preservation, and at least 5% of the fossils recovered from a site must preserve either soft tissue remains or nearly complete individuals, preferably both.

Color key
Konservat	Konzentrat	"Liberation"

== Lagerstätten ==
Site(s)	Age	Location	Significance	Notable fossils/organisms
Guiyang biota	250.8 Ma	Guizhou Province, China	The oldest known Mesozoic Lagerstätte, from the Dienerian substage of the Early Triassic. It preserves taxa belonging to 12 classes and 19 orders, including several species of fish.	Teffichthys elegans, a perleidiform ray-finned fish
Paris biota	~249 Ma	Idaho, Nevada, US	This earliest Spathian-aged assemblage preserves fossils belonging to 7 phyla and 20 orders, combining Paleozoic groups (e.g. leptomitid protomonaxonid sponges otherwise known from the early Paleozoic) with members of the modern evolutionary fauna (e.g. gladius-bearing coleoids).	Ankitokazocaris triassica, a thylacocephalan
Jialingjiang Formation(Including the Nanzhang-Yuan'an Lagerstätte)	249.2–247.2 Ma	Hubei Province, China	This site preserved aquatic reptiles from soon after the Permian extinction. Hupehsuchians are known exclusively from here.	Eretmorhipis, a hupehsuchian that potentially had a platypus-like ecology
Nanlinghu Formation	248 Ma	Anhui Province, China	This site provides important fossils to show the early evolution of ichthyosauriforms.	Cartorhynchus, a primitive ichthyosauriform
Petropavlovka Formation	248 Ma	Orenburg Oblast, Russia	A site known for preserving oligochaetes (earthworms and kin), whose fossil record is extremely sparse.	
Grippia Bonebed (Vikinghøgda Formation)	Lower Spathian (Olenekian)	Svalbard, Norway	A bonebed that provides remains of chondrichthyans, actinopterygians, coelacanths, temnospondyls, ichthyosauriforms and archosauromorphs. Ichthyosauriforms include Grippia.	Life reconstruction of Grippia longirostris.
Gastropod Oolite Member	Induan-Olenekian	North Italy	A Konzentrat site that preserves a high amount of mollusc remains.	
Wangmo biota	Induan-Olenekian	Guizhou, China	A site that preserves articulated fish, crustaceans, thylacocephalans, and other animals. A part of the Luolou Formation.	
Sulfur Mountain Formation	Early Olenekian	Alberta and British Columbia, Canada	A black shale type Monte San Giorgio type Lagerstätte deposited within a marine basin. It preserves thalattosaurs, ichthyosaurs, coelacanths, Eugeneodonts, as well as many invertebrates.	
Sinbad Limestone	Olenekian	Utah, US	A konzentrat site that preserves a high amount of mollusc remains.	
Zarzaïtine Formation	Olenekian-Anisian	In Amenas, Algeria	A site with a high number of exceptionally well-preserved temnospondyl specimens, indicating of a seasonal climate with sudden droughts, and a freshwater ecosystem that could rapidly turn into a sebkha.	
Gogolin Formation	Late Olenekian-Anisian	Krapkowice County, Poland	A Goglin type low-diversity muschelkalk echinoderm Konservat Lagerstätte that preserves mainly Dadocrinids and very few brittle stars.	
Karchowice Formation	Lower Muschelkalk	Poland	A karchowice type Konzentrat Lagerstätte deposited within a shallow sea near an inlet out of the "muschelkalk sea".	
Luoping biota	~247-245 Ma	Yunnan, China	Various marine animals are preserved in this site, showing how marine ecosystems recovered after the Permian extinction. Belongs to the Guanling Formation.	The holotype of Luopingosaurus, a pachypleurosaur
Pedra Alta	Lower Anisian	Mallorca, Spain	A site within the upper portion of the Estellencs Formation that preserves over 50 specimens of mayfly nymph, including gut contents, all in varying stages of development. The deposit's environment is similar to that of Grès à Voltzia.	
Lower Solling Formation	Early Anisian	Saxony-Anhalt, Germany	A site deposited in a seasonally arid to seasonally wet braided river system that has preserved temnospondyl and plant remains. Other sources refer to the Lagerstätte as the Bernburg fossil-Lagerstätte.	Parotosaurus nasutus from Merkel's Quarry
Panxian Biota	Anisian	Guizhou, China	A site that preserves marine reptiles from the same formation as the Luoping Biota (Guanling Formation)	Barracudasauroides, an ichthyosaur preserved in articulation
Hawkesbury Sandstone	Anisian	Sydney, Australia	This sandstone produced many freshwater fish fossils, as well as arthropods.	Austrolimulus, a xiphosuran
Kühwiesenkopf/Monte Prà della Vacca	Anisian	Dolomites, Italy	A locality in the Dont Formation, preserving a mixture of high-fidelity plants, marine invertebrates, fish skeletons, and the early lepidosauromorph Megachirella.	Megachirella, an early lepidosauromorph
Formazione à gracilis	Anisian	Recoaro Terme, Veneto, Italy	A Goglin-type low-diversity muschelkalk echinoderm konservat Lagerstätte that preserves mainly dadocrinids and very few brittle stars.	
Jena Formation	Anisian	Hesse, Germany	A Goglin type low-diversity, and Herberhausen-type high-diversity Muschelkalk echinoderm Lagerstätte that preserves mainly dadocrinids and very few brittle stars.	
Rüdersdorf Formation	Anisian	Germany	A Steinbach type Muschelkalk echinoderm Lagerstätte that preserves mainly brittle stars.	
Göttingen-Herberhausen	Anisian	Lower Saxony, Germany	A Herberhausen-type Muschelkalk echinoderm Lagerstätte that mainly preserves a high diversity of various echinoderm groups, namely asteroids, crinoids, echinoids, and ophiuroids.	
Elvese	Anisian	Lower Saxony, Germany	A Herberhausen-type Muschelkalk echinoderm Lagerstätte that mainly preserves a high diversity of various echinoderm groups, namely asteroids, crinoids, echinoids, and ophiuroids.	
Großenlüder-Bimbach	Anisian	Hesse, Germany	A Herberhausen-type Muschelkalk echinoderm Lagerstätte that mainly preserves a high diversity of various echinoderm groups, namely asteroids, crinoids, echinoids, and ophiuroids. Articulated, in situ Encrinus specimens are known from the deposit.	
Grès à Voltzia	245 Ma	France	A fossil site remarkable for its detailed myriapod specimens. It also contains the earliest known aphid fossils.	Mirasaura, a drepanosauromorph
Fossil Hill Member	? (Anisian)	Nevada, US	One of many Anisian marine Lagerstätte, the Fossil Hill Member represents an open-ocean environment with a well-preserved fauna largely dominated by ichthyosaurs.	The large ichthyosaur Thalattoarchon
Vossenveld Formation	? (Anisian)	Winterswijk,Netherlands	An exposure of this Muschelkalk formation in the Winterswijk quarry has a diverse assemblage of well-preserved marine reptiles, amphibians, fishes, and plants. It is the only marginal marine assemblage recorded from the earlier Triassic.	
Strelovec Formation	? (Anisian)	Slovenia	A formation with well-preserved Triassic horseshoe crabs.	
Calcaire à Entroques	Late Anisian	Alsace, France	A Muschelkalk echinoderm Lagerstätte.	
Troistedt and Gelmeroda Lagerstätte	~240 Ma	Thuringia, Germany	A trace fossil Lagerstätte within the upper Muschelkalk. This site was deposited within a tidal mudflat, with microbial growth and gentle obtrusion allowing for detailed preservation of foraminefera, flatworms, ribbon-worms, annelids, and nematodes alongside their burrows.	
Saharonim Formation	Late Anisian/Lower Ladinian	Southern District, Israel	One brachiopod-dominated horizon of this formation documents the rapid burial of a community of exclusively juvenile Coenothyris brachiopods and ten different bivalve genera.	
Trochitenkalk Formation	Late Anisian/Lower Ladinian	Germany	Neckarwestheim type low-diversity Muschelkalk, and Crailsheim type high diversity echinoderm Lagerstätten that preserve mainly the genus Encrinus. This site was probably deposited from a storm event after very little to no deposition. The Marbach Oolite Member contains a Konzentrat deposit that was deposited in a shallow environment. Finally, the Ekerode Member contains another Knozentrat deposit.	
Calcaire à Cératites Formation	Ladinian	Lorraine, France	A Muschelkalk ophiuroid Lagerstätte similar to the Meißner Formation. Coelacanths such as Graulia were also found in the formation.	
Meißner Formation	Ladinian	Germany	A Neckarwestheim-type low-diversity Muschelkalk echinoderm Lagerstätte that preserves mainly the genus Encrinus. This site was probably deposited from a storm event after very little to no deposition.	
Pelsa-Vazzoler Lagerstätte	Ladinian	Dolomites, Italy	A "Cassian-type" "Liberation Lagerstätte"^{see notes} that contains numerous microfossils of bivalves, gastropods, and other molluscs	
Kupferzell	Ladinian	Baden-Württemberg, Germany	A site that evolved from lagoonal to lacustrine to marine. Fishes, temnospondyls, archosaurs, plants, and aquatic reptiles like Tanystropheus and Nothosaurus have been recovered from the site. The site is a part of the larger Erfurt Formation.	Callistomordax, a temnospondyl amphibian.
Vellberg-Eschenau	Ladinian	Baden-Württemberg, Germany	Rhyncocephalians, lepidosauromorphs, nothosaurus, stem-turtles, amphibians, and fish have been recovered from the site. The site is a part of the larger Erfurt Formation.	
Cassian Formation	Anisian-Carnian	Dolomites, Italy	The proposed archetypical model for a "Liberation Lagerstätte" ^{see notes} contains numerous microfossils.	
Besano Formation	242 Ma	Alps, Italy and Switzerland	This formation, also known as the Grenbitumenzone, is located on the World Heritage Site of Monte San Giorgio. It is famous for its preservation of Middle Triassic marine life, including fish and aquatic reptiles.	Cymbospondylus, one of the many marine reptile specimens preserved in articulation from the Besano Formation
Montral-Alcover	Ladinian	Tarragona, Spain	A site notable for its preservation of cnidarians. Nothosaurs, thalattosuchians, placodonts, and pistosaurs are also known from this Spanish exposure of Muschelkalk.	
Cava Inferiore	Ladinian	Ticino, Switzerland	A part of the Meride Formation at Monte San Giorgio. Protorosaurians, nothosaurs, and actinopterygians have all been recovered from the site.	
Cava Superiore	Ladinian	Ticino, Switzerland	A part of the Meride Formation at Monte San Giorgio. Nothosaurs and actinopterygians have been found at the site.	
Cassina beds	Ladinian	Ticino, Switzerland	A part of the Meride Formation at Monte San Giorgio. Protorosaurians, nothosaurs, and actinopterygians have all been recovered from the site.	
Kalkschieferzone	Ladinian	Ticino, Switzerland	A part of the Meride Formation at Monte San Giorgio. Notably, it has a different composition from the rest of the Monte San Giorgino Lagerstätten, as it contains more carbonate minerals than the other sites. Nothosaurs and actinopterygians have been found at the site.	
Prosanto Formation	Ladinian	Grisons, Switzerland	A formation that preserves actinopterygians, crustaceans, and nothosaurs in an intraplatform basin.	
Xingyi biota	? (Upper Ladinian - Lower Carnian)	Guizhou and Yunnan, China	Previously considered as part of the Falang Formation, this site yields many articulated skeletons of marine reptiles, as well as fish and invertebrates. It is a part of the Zhuganpo Formation.	Keichousaurus, a common pachypleurosaur sauropterygian from this site
Molteno Formation	Lower Carnian	Karoo Basin, South Africa & Lesotho	A site that preserves a diverse assemblage of plant and invertebrate fossils. Currently, over 200 plant species and 300 invertebrate species are known from the site.	
Guanling biota	? (Carnian)	Guizhou, China	Like Xingi Biota, this site also yields well-preserved marine fauna, especially many species of thalattosaurs. It is a part of the Xiaowa Formation.	Odontochelys, the earliest pantestudine (relative of turtles) with a complete plastron (belly shell).
Kozja Dnina Member	Upper Carnian	Julian Alps, Slovenia	A member within the Martuljek Limestones. This site preserves remains of fish, the enigmatic worm Valvasoria carniolica, corals, sea urchins, thylacocephalans, and crustaceans have been recovered from the site. The site was most likely preserved in an outer shelf or inter-platform basin setting.	
Tiki Formation	Carnian-Norian	Madhya Pradesh, India	A site that produces cynodonts, rhynchosaurs, archosaurs, and plants.	
Massetognathus-Chanaresuchus AZ (Chañares Formation)	237-236 Ma	La Rioja, Argentina	A biozone packed with volcaniclastic floodplain sediments, described as "Pompeii-like". Contains hundreds of well-preserved synapsid and archosauriform skeletons within calcareous nodules.	Massetognathus, a traversodontid cynodont, and a namesake for the assemblage zone.
Raibl Beds	Carnian	Cave del Predil, Friuli-Venezia Giulia, Italy	The site was possibly deposited within a deep water basin. The site has produced fish remains, decapod crustaceans, and terrestrial plant remains.	
Polzberg	233 Ma	Lower Austria, Austria	A site from the Reingrabener Schiefer known for exceptional preservation of bromalites and of cartilage, deposited during the Carnian Pluvial Event. The site was deposited within a relatively deep marine basin.	Fossil invertebrates from Polzberg
Lunz Formation	Carnian	Lower Austria, Austria	A site often conflated with the Polzberg Lagerstätte, and sometimes, in older literature, Polzberg is referred to as the 'Lunz' Lagerstätte, the site differs in age, environment, and taphonomy. It was deposited in a deltaic environment that gradually became a coal swamp. The most common fossils at the site are plant fossils.	
Braies ichnosite	Carnian	South Tyrol, Italy	An ichnofossil site from the Carnian Pluvial Episode that preserves extremely dense burrows of Psilonichnus upsilon. During deposition, the site transitioned between shallow floodplain to tidal and subtidal conditions.	
Arcola Lagerstätte	Early Norian	Arcola, Pennsylvania, US	A site that has produced numerous trackways, predominantly within the ichnogenera Rhynchosauroides, Gwyneddichnium, Atreipus, & Apatopus. These tracks are preserved in exceptional detail, with some noted to still preserve the detailed imprints of scales.	
Lipie Śląskie Clay Pit	Middle to Late Norian	Lubliniec County, Silesian Voivodeship, Poland	A Clay Pit that preserves vertebrate remains including Smok wawelski, Lisowicia, alongside other remains.	
Madygen Formation	230 Ma	Kyrgyzstan	The Madygen Formation is renowned for the preservation of more than 20,000 fossil insects, making it one of the richest Triassic Lagerstätten in the world. Plants and rare but unusual vertebrate fossils (including fish, amphibians, reptiles, and synapsids) have also been recovered from the formation.	A cast of the holotype of Sharovipteryx, a well-preserved gliding reptile
Alakir Çay	? (Norian)	southwest Turkey	A Konservat-Lagerstätte with exceptionally well-preserved Triassic corals, retaining much of their original aragonite skeletons.	
Ipswich Lagerstätte (Blackstone Formation)	Late Carnian to middle Norian	Ipswich, Queensland, Australia	A Lagerstätte containing several localities like the Denmark Hill Insect Bed that provide numerous insect fossils with a prevalence of beetles similar to today's.	
Cow Branch Formation	mid-Norian (220 Ma)	Virginia, US	This site preserves a wide variety of fish, reptiles, arachnids, and insects (including abundant true bugs, beetles, and a diverse fauna of early flies).	Mecistotrachelos, a gliding reptile likely belonging to the Archosauromorpha
Pardonet Formation	Middle Norian	British Columbia, Canada	A marine Konservat-Lagerstätte that preserves fossil fish and reptiles, including ichthyosaurs, and Sikannisuchus.	
Paddy Island Tracksite	Middle Norian	Medford, Nova Scotia, Canada	A trackway Lagerstätte.	
Smith Clark Quarry	Middle Norian	Milford, New Jersey, US	A site within the Passaic Formation that produces exceptional fossilized trackways, ranging from small trackways resembling Grallator, to other ichnogenera, including Rhynchosauroides & Brachychirotherium, among others.	
Calcare di Zorzino	Norian	Lombardy, Italy	Limestone renowned for its preservation of early pterosaurs, fish, drepanosaurs, and the tanystropheid Langobardisaurus.	Specimen of the pterosaur Carniadactylus, MPUM 6009
Argillite di Riva di Solto	Norian	Lombardy, Italy	These layers overlay the Zorzino Limestone and preserve a similar fauna, including fish, an unnamed Eudimorphodon-like pterosaur, and the tanystropheid Sclerostropheus.	
Forni Dolostone	Norian (~216–212 Ma)	Friuli-Venezia Giulia, Italy	A site known for its marine reptiles, pterosaurs, drepanosaurs, and crustaceans.	The holotype of the drepanosaur Megalancosaurus
Snyder Quarry	Revueltian = Middle-Late Norian	Rio Arriba County, New Mexico, US	A site within the Petrified Forest Member of the Chinle Formation that preserves a large concentration of vertebrate remains that most likely died from wildfire activity. Recovered animals from the quarry include fish, phytosaurs, amphibians, and archosaurs, including Postosuchus and Eucoelophysis.	
Grès infraliasiques	Rhaetian	Saint-Nicolas-de-Port, Grand Est, France	A Konzentrat site that contains a sand lens that has produced extensive fossilized mammal remains.	
Coelophysis Layer at Ghost Ranch	Rhaetian	New Mexico, US	A Konzentrat site dominated by hundreds of specimens of the dinosaur Coelophysis, all of which most likely died and were collected in flood channel deposits.	A block containing numerous specimens of the dinosaur Coelophysis from the site, on display at the CMNH.
Exeter Township Lagerstätte	Late Rhaetian	Exeter Township, Pennsylvania, US	A trackway Lagerstätte that has produced abundant footprints of Gwyneddichnium & Apatopus.	
Woodland Park Lagerstätte	Latest Rhaetian	Woodland Park, New Jersey, US	A trackway Lagerstätte that preserves many footprints of Theropod Dinosaurs.	
Bluff Head Bed (Shuttle Meadow Formation)	Rhaetian-Hettangian	Connecticut, US	A Konzentrat site that produces a large number of well-preserved fish fossils, including holosteans, palaeonisciforms , and coelacanths. This site most likely formed within a large rift lake around the size of the modern Lake Tanganyika during the breakup of Pangea.	
Turners Falls Dam	Late Triassic	Deerfield basin, Massachusetts, US	A site that produces abundant fish remains, including Semionotiformes, Diplurus, & Redfieldius.	
El Mono Formation	Late Triassic	Atacama, Chile	A rift lake system that preserves plants, fish, conchostracans, ostracods, and insects.	
Hosselkus Limestone	Late Triassic	California, US	Mostly known for its marine reptiles.	
Saints & Sinners locality	Latest Triassic	Utah, US	A site within the Nugget Sandstone that preserves a bonebed of over 20,000 vertebrates, with associated dinosaur tracks.	
