= Permosynoidea =

Scientific classification
- Domain: Eukaryota
- Kingdom: Animalia
- Phylum: Arthropoda
- Class: Insecta
- Order: Coleoptera
- Suborder: †Protocoleoptera
- Superfamily: †Permosynoidea

Families
- Ademosynidae; Permosynidae

Extinct superfamily of beetles

Permosynoidea is a superfamily of Protocoleoptera that contains two known families. The type family is Permosynidae.
