= Tshekardocoleoidea =

Scientific classification
- Domain: Eukaryota
- Kingdom: Animalia
- Phylum: Arthropoda
- Class: Insecta
- Order: Coleoptera
- Suborder: †Protocoleoptera
- Superfamily: †Tshekardocoleoidea; Rohdendorf, 1944

Extinct superfamily of beetles

Tshekardocoleoidea is a superfamily in the extinct suborder Protocoleoptera that contains the following families:

- †Coleopsidae Kirejtshuk & Nel, 2016
- †Labradorocoleoidae Ponomarenko, 1969
- †Oborocoleidae Kukalová, 1969
- †Tshekardocoleidae Rohdendorf, 1944
