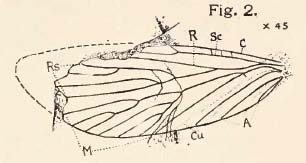

Scientific classification
- Kingdom: Animalia
- Phylum: Arthropoda
- Clade: Pancrustacea
- Class: Insecta
- Order: Mecoptera
- Family: †Permochoristidae
- Genus: †Mesochorista
- Species: †M. proavita

Binomial name
- †Mesochorista proavita Tillyard, 1916

Synonyms
- †Eoses triassica Tindale 1945 (disputed)

= Mesochorista proavita =

Mesochorista proavita Temporal range: Carnian

Extinct species of insect

Mesochorista proavita is an extinct species of scorpionfly from the Triassic period of Queensland, Australia.

== Discovery ==
Specimens of Mesochorista proavita were first described by the English-Australian entomologist Robert John Tillyard in 1916. The fossils were recovered from the Denmark Hill Insect Bed of Queensland, Australia. The type locality belongs to the Blackstone Formation (Ipswich Coal Measures Group) and is dated to the Carnian age (228.0–216.5 million years ago) of the Triassic period.

Specimens of Eoses triassica, sometimes considered a synonym of this species, were discovered in 1945 by the Australian entomologist Norman Tindale from the Mt. Crosby Insect Bed of Queensland, Australia. They are also dated to the Carnian age.

== Taxonomy ==
M. proavita belongs to the family Permochoristidae (formerly Mesochoristidae) of the scorpionflies (order Mecoptera).

E.F. Riek synonymized Eoses triassica with M. proavita in 1955, regarding it as a second specimen. In doing so, he identified the fossil as a mecopteran rather than a lepidopteran as it was originally described as. Citing morphological differences in wing venation and publishing errors, Norman B. Tindale challenged this conclusion in 1980. He maintains that the three known specimens of Eoses triassica belong to the lepidopteran family Eocoronidae.
