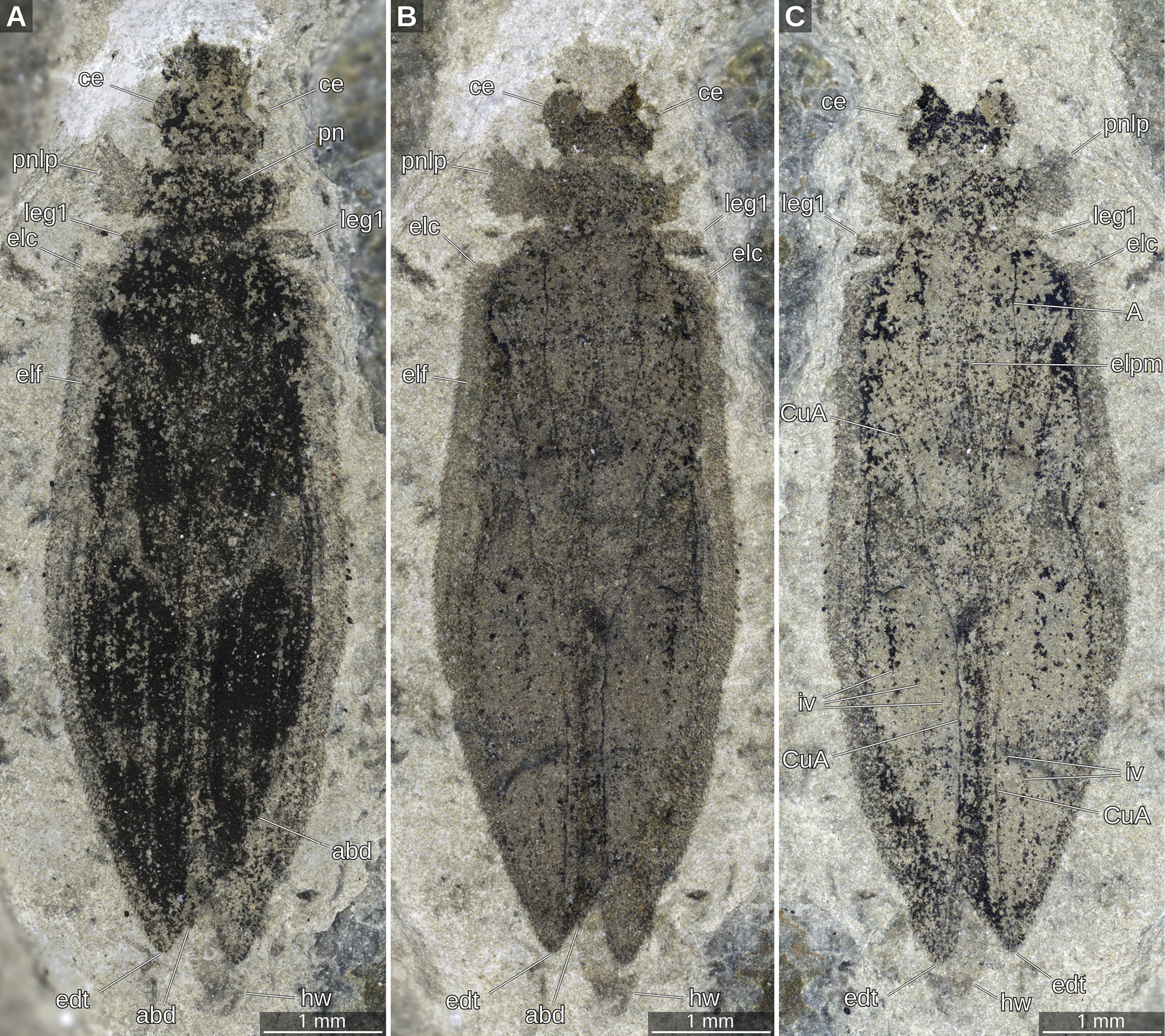
- Holotype fossil showing part (A) counterpart (C) and virtually combined (B)
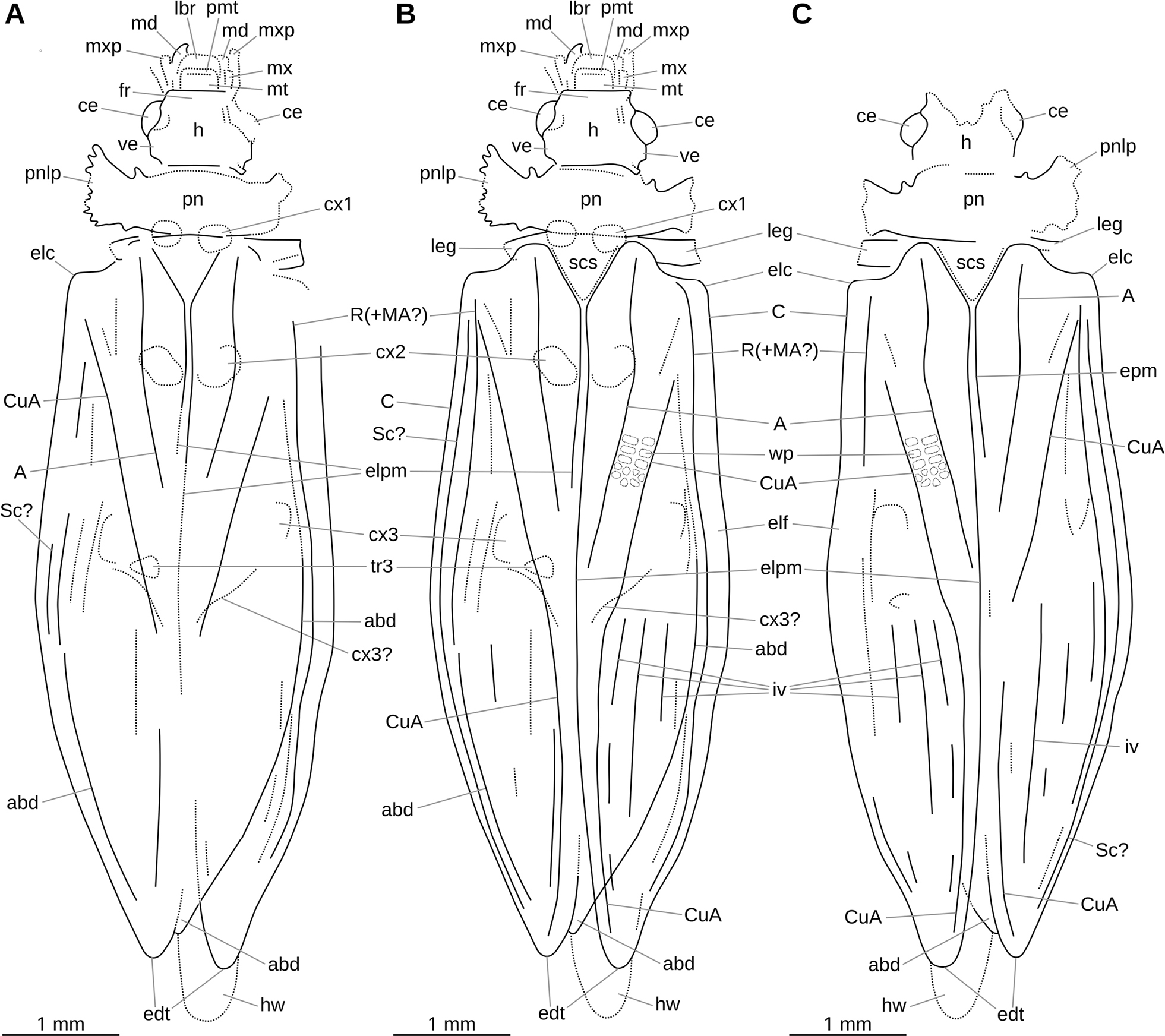
- Interpretive drawing of the part (A) counterpart (C) and combined (B)

Scientific classification
- Kingdom: Animalia
- Phylum: Arthropoda
- Class: Insecta
- Order: Coleoptera
- Suborder: †Protocoleoptera
- Superfamily: †Coleopsoidea; Kirejtshuk & Nel, 2016
- Family: †Coleopsidae; Kirejtshuk & Nel, 2016
- Genus: †Coleopsis; Kirejtshuk et al., 2014
- Species: †C. archaica

Binomial name
- †Coleopsis archaica Kirejtshuk et al., 2014

Synonyms
- Coleopseidae Kirejtshuk, 2020 (Unj. Emend.)

= Coleopsis =

Coleopsis Temporal range: Cisuralian (latest Asselian or earliest Sakmarian), 297 Ma (estimated)

Extinct genus of beetles

Coleopsis is an extinct genus of stem-group beetles. It contains a single species, Coleopsis archaica, and is the only member of the family Coleopsidae and superfamily Coleopsoidea. It is known from a single specimen from the Early Permian of southwestern Germany, estimated to be about 297 million years old. It is currently the oldest known beetle.

== History of research ==
The single specimen used to describe Coleopsis archaica (the holotype), ZfB 3315, comes from a small outcrop (exposed bedrock) south of the village of Grügelborn, approximately 6 kilometres (3.7 mi) north-northeast from the town of Sankt Wendel, in northeastern Saarland, Germany. The rocks belong to the Humberg Bed, located in the uppermost part of the Meisenheim Formation, which is part of the Rotliegend lithostratigraphic unit of the Saar-Nahe Basin. Slightly older sediments from the same formation were dated to 297.0 ± 3.2 Ma, suggesting that the Coleopsis archaica fossil dates to the latest Asselian age or the earliest Sakmarian age of the Early Permian.

Poschmann and Schindler first published photographs and figures of the specimen in 2004, in a paper discussing Sitters and Grügelborn as fossil-bearing localities of the Saar-Nahe Basin. Poschmann refigured the specimen in 2007. Kirejtshuk, Poschmann and co-authors then published a formal description of the species in 2014, naming it Coleopsis archaica. The generic name, Coleopsis, is derived from the Greek words κολεός (koleós, meaning "sheath, scabbard") and ὄψῐς (ópsĭs, meaning "aspect, appearance"). The specific name, archaica, is derived from the Latin word archaicus (meaning "archaic"), used to mean that the species is an ancient, archaic beetle.

In 2022, Schädel and co-authors re-examined and refigured the specimen using Reflectance Transformation Imaging, which revealed misinterpretations in earlier descriptions such as severely underestimating the length of the hind wings and the size of the scutellar shield (a triangular plate behind the pronotum), or illustrating structures that were not actually recognizable in the fossil.

== Description ==
Coleopsis has a slender body with a total length of 7.8 millimetres (0.31 in) and a maximum width 2.5 millimetres (1/8 in), widest slightly anterior to (forward of) the posterior third of the body. The anterior part of the body (the head and prothorax) is unusually short relative to the rest of the body (the pterothorax and abdomen) which makes up about 80% of the total length. The head is wedge-shaped, prognathous (having forward-facing mouthparts), about as broad as long, and has large and strongly convex eyes that strongly protrude laterally. The antennae are not preserved in the fossil. The pronotum (the top part of the prothorax) is very short and transverse, being more than three times as wide as it is long medially, and has flattened lateral processes (projections) with a coarsely serrated margin. The scutellar shield is large and triangular, and is about as long as the pronotum. Both the head and pronotum are covered with fine tubercules.

The elytra (hardened forewings) are long and slender, measuring about 80% of the total body length, and are nearly five times as long as their maximum width. Unlike in extant beetles and most stem-group beetles except Tshekardocoleidae, they cover the body loosely, extend beyond the apex of the abdomen, and lack epipleura (outer margins) instead forming flattened lateral flanges. The loose fit of the elytra also means they do not form a tightly sealed subelytral space as in extant beetles. The elytra have several distinct veins spanning their length, as well as several less-distinct shorter veins on the posterior third of the body. "Window punctures" are present but only in a limited area of the elytra; this may either be an autapomorphy of Coleopsis or an artifact caused by the strong compression of the fossil. Window punctures are also present on the elytra of extant families Cupedidae and Ommatidae as well as some other stem-group beetle families such as Tshekardocoleidae and Permocupedidae.

The legs are partially preserved in the fossil. Of the front legs, the coxae (the basal segments of the legs) are recognizable, being small, rounded and medially separated, and the femora (the third segments of the legs) are visible between the pronotum and elytra. The coxae of both the middle and hind legs are indistinctly visible, the middle coxa being ovoid and slightly oblique and slightly separated medially and the hind coxa being transverse. A trochanter (the second segment of the leg, between the coxa and femur) of one of the hind legs is visible, and is triangular in shape with rounded edges. The remaining parts of the legs are not preserved or not recognizable.

== Taxonomy and systematics ==
Coleopsis was originally described by Kirejtshuk et al. (2014) as a member of the family Tshekardocoleidae within the superfamily Tshekardocoleoidea, itself within a broad concept of the suborder Archostemata. Later, Coleopsis was classified in its own family within Tshekardocoleidea by Kirejtshuk & Nel (2016). It was then placed in its own superfamily by Kirejtshuk (2020), proposed because it was claimed to have more remnants of the archedictyon in the wing venation of its elytra than that of tshekardocoleids. In the classifications of Cai et al. (2022) and Bouchard et al. (2024), Coleopsis and Tshekardcoleidae among other stem-group beetles are assigned to the extinct suborder Alphacoleoptera (also known as Protocoleoptera), though this is a paraphyletic group.

Schädel et al. (2022) found that Coleopsis is a stem-group beetle, outside of a clade containing all beetles excluding Tshekardocoleidae. However, the authors could not determine if Coleopsis belonged to the Tshekardocoleidae or not, as they could not identify any synapomorphies (shared derived traits) uniting the two taxa and found that Tshekardocoleidae itself is possibly not a monophyletic group.

The phylogenetic tree below shows the possible phylogenetic positions of Coleopsis, after Schädel et al. (2022):

- Coleoptera (sensu lato)
  - †Coleopsis(?)
  - †Tshekardocoleidae
    †Coleopsis(?)
  - - †Permocupedidae
    - Metacoleoptera (all other beetles)

The family name was originally published in 2016 as "Coleopsidae" but Kirejtshuk (2020) claimed that this spelling was erroneous and proposed the spelling "Coleopseidae"; however, under the ICZN, Article 29.4, family-rank names originally published after 1999 are not subject to emendation because of incorrect spelling, so Coleopsidae would be maintained as the correct original spelling. (Note: ICZN Code 29.4. Acceptance of originally formed stem. If after 1999 a new family-group name is based on a generic name which is or ends in a Greek or Latin word or ends in a Greek or Latin suffix, but its derivation does not follow the grammatical procedures of Articles 29.3.1 or 29.3.2, its original spelling must be maintained as the correct original spelling)
