= Elpistoichthys =

Elpistoichthys Temporal range: Early Carnian

Scientific classification
- Domain: Eukaryota
- Kingdom: Animalia
- Phylum: Chordata
- Class: Actinopterygii
- Family: †Ichthyokentemidae
- Genus: †Elpistoichthys; Griffith, 1977

Species
- E. pectinatus Griffith, 1977; E. striolatus Griffith, 1977

Extinct genus of fishes

Elpistoichthys (meaning "hopeful fish") is an extinct genus of prehistoric marine ray-finned fish, likely a teleosteomorph, that lived in Europe during the early Carnian stage of the Late Triassic epoch. It is known from the Reingrabener Schiefer formation of Austria.

The following two species are known, both from the Carnian of Austria:

- E. pectinatus Griffith, 1977
- E. striolatus Griffith, 1977

It has been tentatively assigned to the family Ichthyokentemidae, but it has not been revised since this initial classification and its taxonomic identity remains uncertain.

== See also ==
- Prehistoric fish
- List of prehistoric bony fish
