= A. major =

A. major may refer to:

- Ademosyne major, an extinct beetle species in the genus Ademosyne, the family Ademosynidae and the suborder Archostemata
- Allactaga major, the great jerboa, a rodent species found in Kazakhstan, Russia, Turkmenistan and Uzbekistan
- Ammosaurus major, an extinct herbivorous dinosaur from the Early Jurassic of New England, probably synonymous with Anchisaurus polyzelus
- Amphicyon major, an extinct carnivorous mammal species from the middle Miocene found across Europe and in western Turkey
- Aphrastochthonius major, a pseudoscorpion species in the genus Aphrastochthonius and the family Chthoniidae
- Arachis major, a flowering plant species in the genus Arachis native to South America

== See also ==
- Major (disambiguation)
- A major, a major scale based on A
