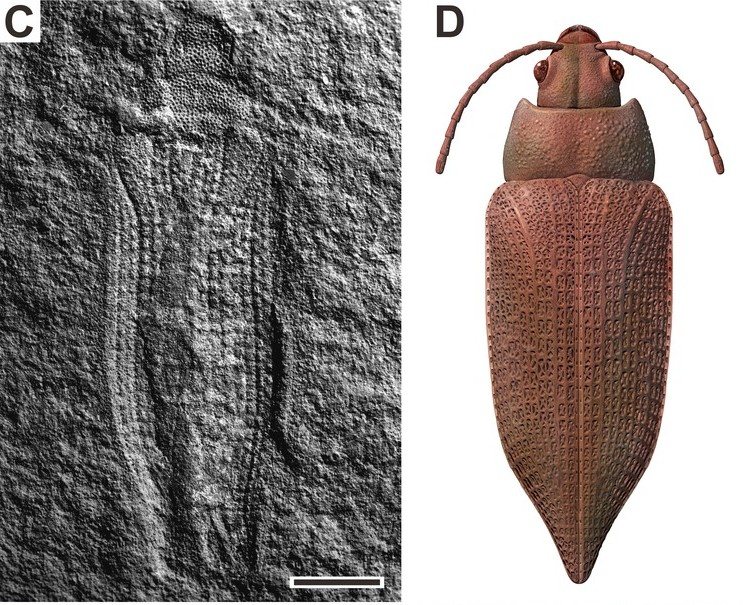
- Permocupes sojanensis holotype and reconstruction

Scientific classification
- Domain: Eukaryota
- Kingdom: Animalia
- Phylum: Arthropoda
- Class: Insecta
- Order: Coleoptera
- Suborder: †Protocoleoptera
- Superfamily: †Permocupedoidea; Martynov, 1933

Families
- Permocupedidae; Taldycupedidae

= Permocupedoidea =

Extinct superfamily of beetles

Permocupedoidea is a superfamily of Protocoleoptera that contains two known families. The type family is Permocupedidae.
