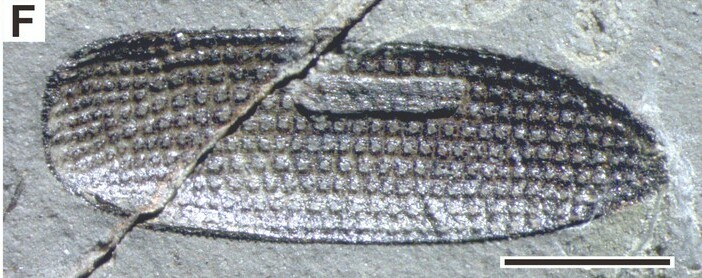
- Taldycupes reticulatus elytra photograph

Scientific classification
- Kingdom: Animalia
- Phylum: Arthropoda
- Class: Insecta
- Order: Coleoptera
- Suborder: †Protocoleoptera
- Superfamily: †Permocupedoidea
- Family: †Taldycupedidae; Rohdendorf, 1961

Genera
- See text

= Taldycupedidae =

Taldycupedidae Temporal range: Middle Permian–Late Permian

Extinct family of beetles

Taldycupedidae is an extinct family of beetles primarily known from the Permian period.

== Taxonomy ==
Kirejtshuk (2020) included the following genera in Taldycupedidae, preliminarily treating it as a subfamily Taldycupedinae of the family Permocupedidae.

- Afrotaldycupes Kirejtshuk, 2020 – Beaufort Group, South Africa, Late Permian (Changhsingian)
  - Afrotaldycupes africanus (Ponomarenko, 2005) (Type species)
  - Afrotaldycupes lidgettoniensis (Ponomarenko, 2005)
- Mesothoris Tillyard, 1916 – Blackstone Formation, Australia Late Triassic (Norian)
  - Mesothoris clathrata Tillyard, 1916 (Type species)
  - Mesothoris grandis Dunstan, 1923
  - Mesothoris punctomarginum Dunstan, 1923
- Proterocupes Ponomarenko, 2015 (syn Lobanovia Kirejtshuk, 2020)
  - Proterocupes major Ponomarenko, 2015 – Vokhma Formation, Vologda, Russia, Late Permian (Changhsingian)
  - Proterocupes nedubrovensis Ponomarenko, 2015 – Vokhma Formation, Vologda, Russia, Late Permian (Changhsingian)
  - Proterocupes permiana (Ponomarenko, 2015) (Type species) – Poldarsa Formation, Vologda, Russia, Late Permian (Wuchiapingian)
- Simmondsia Dunstan, 1923 – Blackstone Formation, Australia Late Triassic (Norian)
  - Simmondsia cylindrica Dunstan, 1923
  - Simmondsia subpiriformis Dunstan, 1923 (Type species)
- Taldycupes Rohdendorf, 1961 (syn Cryptocupes Rohdendorf, 1961, Taldycupidium Rohdendorf, 1961)
  - Taldycupes bergi (Rohdendorf, 1961) – Gramoteinskaya Formation, Kemerovo Oblast, Russia, Late Permian
  - Taldycupes cellulosus Ponomarenko, 2013 – Poldarsa Formation, Vologda, Russia, Late Permian (Wuchiapingian)
  - Taldycupes khalfini Rohdendorf, 1961 (Type species) – Gramoteinskaya Formation, Kemerovo Oblast, Russia, Late Permian
  - Taldycupes moltshanovi Rohdendorf, 1961 – Gramoteinskaya Formation, Kemerovo Oblast, Russia, Late Permian
  - Taldycupes pingi Ponomarenko et al. 2014 – Yinping Formation, Anhui, China, Middle Permian (Capitanian)
  - Taldycupes reticulatus Ponomarenko, 1969 – Akkolka Formation, Kazakhstan, Late Permian (Changhsingian)
  - Taldycupes rosanovi Ponomarenko, 2006 – Limptekon Formation, Krasnoyarsk, Russia, Late Permian (Changhsingian)
  - Taldycupes vasjuchitshevi (Rohdendorf, 1961) – Gramoteinskaya Formation, Kemerovo Oblast, Russia, Late Permian
- Tecticupes Rohdendorf, 1961 (syn Stegocupes Rohdendorf, 1961)
  - Tecticupes heckeri Rohdendorf, 1961 (Type species) – Kazankovo-Markinskaya Formation, Kemerovo, Russia, Middle Permian (Wordian) Mitina Formation, Kemerovo, Russia, Middle Permian (Roadian)
  - Tecticupes indistinctus Rohdendorf, 1961 – Kazankovo-Markinskaya Formation, Kemerovo, Russia, Middle Permian (Wordian)
  - Tecticupes martynovi Ponomarenko, 2013 – Amanak Formation. Orenburg, Middle Permian (Capitanian)
- Tychticupes Rohdendorf, 1961 – Gramoteinskaya Formation, Kemerovo Oblast, Russia, Late Permian
  - Tychticupes beljanini (Rohdendorf, 1961)
  - Tychticupes radtshenkoi Rohdendorf, 1961 (Type species)
  - Tychticupes ragozini Rohdendorf 1961
  - "Tychticupes" ussovi Rohdendorf 1961 (nomen dubium)
- Tychticupoides Rohdendorf, 1961 – Gramoteinskaya Formation, Kemerovo Oblast, Russia, Late Permian
  - Tychticupoides grjazevi Rohdendorf, 1961 (Type species)
- Uskaticupes Rohdendorf, 1961 (nomen dubium) – Gramoteinskaya Formation, Kemerovo Oblast, Russia, Late Permian
  - Uskaticupes javorskyi Rohdendorf, 1961 (nomen dubium)

The genera Alveolacupes Lin, 1983, Clathropenna Fujiyama, 1973 and Penecupes Ren, 1995 were previously placed in the family by some authors, but were all excluded from it by Kirejtshuk (2020). The genera Wuchangia Hong, 1985 and Yuxianocoleus Hong, 1985, both from the Lower Jurassic of Hubei, China, were also excluded from the family by Zhao et al. (2021) (as the subfamily Taldycupedinae).
