= Los Rastros Formation =

Geological formation in Argentina

- Stratigraphic range: Carnian; 234.91–234.03 Ma
- Type: Geological formation
- Unit of: Agua de la Peña Group
- Underlies: Ischigualasto Formation
- Overlies: Chañares Formation
- Thickness: Up to 1,000 m (3,300 ft)

Lithology
- Primary: Claystone, sandstone
- Other: Mudstone

Location
- Coordinates: 29.1°S 69.1°W
- Approximate paleocoordinates: 45.8°S 34.9°W
- Region: La Rioja Province; San Juan Province
- Country: Argentina
- Extent: Ischigualasto-Villa Unión Basin
- Los Rastros Formation (Argentina)

The Los Rastros Formation is a mid-Carnian fossiliferous formation of the Agua de la Peña Group, in the Ischigualasto-Villa Unión Basin of northwestern Argentina. Fossil archosaur tracks, as well as many insects, fish, bivalves, crustaceans and plants have been reported from the formation.

== Geology ==
The formation overlies the Chañares Formation (and/or the Ischicuca Formation), and is overlain by the Ischigualasto Formation. The formation belongs to the Agua de la Peña Group of the Ischigualasto-Villa Unión Basin, where it is exposed in the Ischigualasto Provincial Park, a World Heritage Site in Argentina. The up to 1,000 metres (3,300 ft) thick formation of claystones, mudstones and sandstones was deposited in a deltaic to lacustrine environment during the first post-rift sequence in the basin.

A CA-TIMS U-Pb zircon age of 234.47 ± 0.44 Ma from the lower Los Rastros Formation was published in 2020. The acquired age demonstrates that most of the overlying lacustrine strata within the basin were deposited during or after the Carnian Pluvial Event (CPE).

== Paleobiota ==
The only tetrapod body fossil reported from the Los Rastros Formation is a poorly-preserved temnospondyl amphibian.

=== Ichnofossils ===
Tetrapod footprints are a conspicuous type of ichnofossils (trace fossils) found in the Los Rastros Formation, particularly at the Quebrada de Ischichuca locality near Cerro Bola. Most of the trackways are symmetrical prints created by animals with a narrow bipedal stance, three toes contacting the ground, and a raised fourth toe. They were presumably early dinosaurs or dinosauromorphs, with a hip height exceeding 75 cm. These prints are found in deltaic sandbars, parallel to the lakeshore. While some sources tentatively interpret these as theropod footprints, the generalized nature of Triassic dinosaurs and their relatives prevent a precise referral. Some of the tridactyl trackways also preserve hand prints, with quadrupedal pseudosuchians or other archosaurs as likely trackmakers. Named reptile ichnotaxa from the Los Rastros Formation include Rhynchosauroides sp. (sphenodonts or other small reptiles) and Rigalites ischigualastianus (large quadrupedal pseudosuchians).

Another form of trackway consists of numerous non-overlapping sets of broad rounded depressions on a heavily trampled wackestone surface. They may have been left by a herd of dicynodonts walking down to the lakeshore. Palaeophycus tubularis invertebrate burrows are also abundant.

=== Fish ===
Actinopterygians (ray-finned fish) of the Los Rastros Formation
Genus	Species	Locality	Material	Notes	Images
Challaia	C. elongata	Agua de la Peña Creek (San Juan Province)	A very large (>70 cm) specimen which is mostly complete, missing the tail and the front of the skull.	A late-surviving acrolepid, also known from the Cuyo Basin. Previously referred to Myriolepis.	
Gualolepis	G. carinaesquamosa	Cañón del Gualo (La Rioja Province)	Two specimens, each representing portions of the skull and anterior torso.	A probable chondrostean (distantly related to modern sturgeons and paddlefish) with similarities to the family Peipiaosteidae.	
Rastrolepis	R. latipinnata	Cañón del Gualo (La Rioja Province)	A large (>39 cm) specimen which is mostly complete, missing the rear of the tail and the front of the skull.	An indeterminate actinopterygian similar to redfieldiiforms	
Rastrolepis	R. riojaensis	Cañón del Gualo (La Rioja Province)	A large (>54 cm) specimen which is mostly complete.	An indeterminate actinopterygian similar to redfieldiiforms	

=== Invertebrates ===
The Los Rastros Formation has produced many insect fossils, with most new species belonging to blattopterans (cockroaches and kin), coleopterans (beetles and kin), or hemipterans (true bugs). Among Triassic formations of South America, the Los Rastros Formation's insect diversity is only rivaled by the Potrerillos Formation in the Cuyo Basin. Other invertebrate fossils from the Los Rastros Formation include Lioestheria ("conchostracans" or clam shrimp) and Paleomutella (freshwater mussels).

==== Blattoptera ====
Blattoptera (cockroaches and relatives) of the Los Rastros Formation
Genus	Species	Locality	Material	Notes	Images
Argentinoblatta	A. herbsti	Río Gualo (La Rioja Province)			
Argentinoblattula	A. revelata	Río Gualo (La Rioja Province)			
Condorblatta	C. lutzae	Río Gualo, Los Chañares (La Rioja Province)			
Hermosablatta	H. crassatella	Río Gualo, Picos Gemelos (La Rioja Province)			
Hermosablatta	H. pectinata	Río Gualo (La Rioja Province)			
Lariojablatta	L. chanarensis	Los Chañares (La Rioja Province)			
Mancusoblatta	M. pulchella	Río Gualo (La Rioja Province)			
Pulchellablatta	P. nana	Río Gualo (La Rioja Province)			
Samaroblatta	S. corrientesina	Río Gualo (La Rioja Province)			
Samaroblatta	S. gualoensis	Río Gualo (La Rioja Province)			
Triassoblatta	T. argentina	Picos Gemelos (La Rioja Province)			

==== Coleoptera ====
Coleoptera (beetles and relatives) of the Los Rastros Formation
Genus	Species	Locality	Material	Notes	Images
Ademosyne	A. arcucciae			An ademosynid	
Ademosyne	A. elongatus			An ademosynid	
Ademosyne	A. hexacostata			An ademosynid	
Ademosyne	A. punctuada			An ademosynid	
Argentinocupes	A. abdalai			A cupedid (reticulated beetle)	
Argentinocupes	A. pulcher	Río Gualo, Los Chañares (La Rioja Province)		A cupedid (reticulated beetle)	
Argentinosyne	A. bonapartei	Los Chañares (La Rioja Province)		A permosynid	
Argentinosyne	A. frenguellii			A permosynid	
Argentinosyne	A. gonaldiae			A permosynid	
Argentinosyne	A. gualoensis			A permosynid	
Argentinosyne	A. losrastroensis			A permosynid	
Argentinosyne	A. rugosa			A permosynid	
Cardiosyne	C. elegans			A possible elaterid (click beetle)	
Cardiosyne	C. obesa			A possible elaterid (click beetle)	
Gemelina	G. triangularis			A possible elaterid (click beetle)	

==== Hemiptera ====
Indeterminate corixids (water boatmen) are also known from the Gualo locality.

Hemipterans (true bugs) of the Los Rastros Formation
Genus	Species	Locality	Material	Notes	Images
Apheloscyta	A. mayae	Gualo (La Rioja Province)		A scytinopterid cicadomorph (a type of true bug related to leafhoppers and cicadas). Previously given the name Gualoscytina mayae.	
Dysmorphoptiloides	D. losrastroensis	Gualo (La Rioja Province)		A dysmorphoptilid auchenorrhynchan	
Fulgobole	F. arcucciae	Gualo (La Rioja Province)		A mesojabloniid cicadomorph. Previously given the name Australocicada arcucciae.	
Gallegomorphoptila	G. acostai	Gualo (La Rioja Province)		A dysmorphoptilid auchenorrhynchan, formerly referred to the genus Dysmorphoptiloides.	
Gallegomorphoptila	G. breviptera	Gualo (La Rioja Province)		A dysmorphoptilid auchenorrhynchan	
Gallegomorphoptila	G. gigantea	Gualo (La Rioja Province)		A dysmorphoptilid auchenorrhynchan, formerly referred to the genus Dysmorphoptiloides.	
Gallegomorphoptila	G. pulcherrima	Gualo (La Rioja Province)		A dysmorphoptilid auchenorrhynchan, formerly referred to the genus Dysmorphoptiloides.	
Gualoscarta	G. obscura	Gualo (La Rioja Province)		A dysmorphoptilid auchenorrhynchan	
Mesoscytina	M. forsterae	Gualo (La Rioja Province)		A scytinopterid cicadomorph. Previously given the name Argentinopheloscyta forsterae.	
Popovigocimex	P. yurii	Gualo (La Rioja Province)	Forewing	A progonocimicid coleorrhynchan (moss bug)	
Saaloscytina	S. carmonae	Los Chañares, Gualo (La Rioja Province)		A saaloscytinid cicadomorph. Fossils of this species were formerly given the names Chanarelytrina nana and Chanarescytina carmonae.	
Yurigocimex	Y. popovi	Gualo (La Rioja Province)	Forewing	A progonocimicid coleorrhynchan (moss bug)	

==== Other insects ====
Other insects of the Los Rastros Formation
Genus	Species	Locality	Material	Notes	Images
Argentinoglosselytrina	A. pulchella	Gualo (La Rioja Province)		A polycytellid glosselytrodean	
Argentinoperlidium	A. rogersi	Gualo (La Rioja Province)	Forewing fragment	A gripopterigid plecopteran (stonefly).	
Frenguelliphlebia	F. labandeirai	Gualo (La Rioja Province)	Forewing fragment	An indeterminate odonatopteran (a relative of dragonflies and damselfies)	
Miomina	M. riojana	Los Chañares (La Rioja Province)		A miomopteran	
Notopamphagopsis	N. spp.	Gualo (La Rioja Province)	Wing fragments	Three unnamed species of haglid ensiferans (cricket-like insects)	

=== Plants ===
A wide variety of plant fossils are known from the Los Rastros Formation, including both microfossils and macrofossils.

Most species from the formation have been listed by Lutz et al. (2011) and Pedernera et al. (2020).

- Calamitales
- Coniferales
- Cycadales
- Equisetales
- Osmundales
- Rhexoxilales

==== Seed ferns ====
"Seed fern" macrofossils of the Los Rastros Formation
Genus	Species	Locality	Material	Notes	Images
Dejerseya	D. lobata	Ischigualasto Provincial Park (San Juan Province)	Frond fragments	A possible peltasperm	
Dejerseya	D. lunensis	Ischigualasto Provincial Park (San Juan Province)	Frond fragments	A possible peltasperm	
Dicroidium	D. argenteum	Ischigualasto Provincial Park (San Juan Province)	Frond fragments	An umkomasialean (or corystosperm)	
Dicroidium	D. crassum	Ischigualasto Provincial Park (San Juan Province)	Frond fragments	An umkomasialean (or corystosperm)	
Dicroidium	D. dubium	Ischigualasto Provincial Park (San Juan Province), Ischichuca Creek	Frond fragments	An umkomasialean (or corystosperm)	
Dicroidium	D. lancifolium	Ischigualasto Provincial Park (San Juan Province), Ischichuca Creek	Frond fragments	An umkomasialean (or corystosperm)	
Dicroidium	D. lineatum	Ischigualasto Provincial Park (San Juan Province)	Frond fragments	An umkomasialean (or corystosperm)	
Dicroidium	D. nondichotoma	Ischigualasto Provincial Park (San Juan Province)	Frond fragments	An umkomasialean (or corystosperm)	
Dicroidium	D. obtusifolium	Ischigualasto Provincial Park (San Juan Province)	Frond fragments	An umkomasialean (or corystosperm)	
Dicroidium	D. odontopteroides	Ischigualasto Provincial Park (San Juan Province), Gualo (La Rioja Province), Ischichuca Creek	Frond fragments	An umkomasialean (or corystosperm)	
Dicroidium	D. pinnis-distantibus	Ischichuca Creek		An umkomasialean (or corystosperm)	
Johnstonia	J. coriacea	Agua de la Peña Creek, Ischichuca Creek	Frond fragments	An umkomasialean (or corystosperm)	
Johnstonia	J. dutoitii	Ischigualasto Provincial Park (San Juan Province)	Frond fragments	An umkomasialean (or corystosperm)	
Johnstonia	J. stelzneriana	Ischigualasto Provincial Park (San Juan Province), Gualo (La Rioja Province) Ischichuca Creek	Frond fragments	An umkomasialean (or corystosperm)	
Matatiella	M. roseta		Seed cones	A seed fern of uncertain affinities, possibly a peltasperm or umkomasialean	
Pachydermophyllum	P. papillosum	Agua de la Peña Creek.	Frond fragments	A peltasperm	
Pachydermophyllum	P. praecordillerae	Ischigualasto Provincial Park (San Juan Province)	Frond fragments	A peltasperm	
Peltaspermum	P. monodiscum	Agua de la Peña Creek.	Seed cones	A peltasperm	
Rhexoxylon	R. sp.	Ischichuca Creek	Fossil wood	An umkomasialean (or corystosperm)	
Rochipteris	R. alexandriana	Ischigualasto Provincial Park (San Juan Province)	Frond fragments	A possible petriellalean	
Umkomasia	U. macleanii		Strobili (seed cones)	An umkomasialean (or corystosperm)	
Xylopteris	X. argentina	Ischigualasto Provincial Park (San Juan Province), Gualo (La Rioja Province), Ischichuca Creek	Frond fragments	An umkomasialean (or corystosperm)	
Xylopteris	X. densifolia	Ischigualasto Provincial Park (San Juan Province)	Frond fragments	An umkomasialean (or corystosperm)	
Xylopteris	X. elongata	Ischigualasto Provincial Park (San Juan Province), Gualo (La Rioja Province), Ischichuca Creek	Frond fragments	An umkomasialean (or corystosperm)	
Xylopteris	X. rigida	Ischigualasto Provincial Park (San Juan Province)	Frond fragments	An umkomasialean (or corystosperm)	
Zuberia	Z. brownii	Ischichuca Creek		An umkomasialean (or corystosperm)	
Zuberia	Z. feistmantelii	Gualo (La Rioja Province)	Frond fragments	An umkomasialean (or corystosperm)	
Zuberia	Z. sahnii	Ischigualasto Provincial Park (San Juan Province), Ischichuca Creek	Frond fragments	An umkomasialean (or corystosperm)	
Zuberia	Z. zuberi	Ischigualasto Provincial Park (San Juan Province), Ischichuca Creek	Frond fragments	An umkomasialean (or corystosperm)	

==== Other gymnosperms ====
Gymnosperm macrofossils of the Los Rastros Formation
Genus	Species	Locality	Material	Notes	Images
Acevedoa	A. rastroensis	Ischigualasto Provincial Park (San Juan Province)	Female fructifications	Reproductive structures of a gymnosperm of uncertain affinities. Initially described under the (preoccupied) name Andersonia.	
Baiera	B. africana	Ischigualasto Provincial Park (San Juan Province)	Leaf fragments	A ginkgoalean.	
Baiera	B. pontifolia	Ischigualasto Provincial Park (San Juan Province), Gualo (La Rioja Province)	Leaf fragments	A ginkgoalean.	
Baiera	B. schenkii	Ischigualasto Provincial Park (San Juan Province)	Leaf fragments	A ginkgoalean.	
Cordaicarpus	C. sp.	Gualo (La Rioja Province)	Seeds	Cordaitalean conifer seeds.	
Cycadocarpium	C. andium	Agua de la Peña Creek.			
Czekanowskia	C. rigali	Agua de la Peña Creek.		A czekanowskialean.	
Desmiophyllum	D. sp.	Agua de la Peña Creek.			
Dordrectites	D. elongatus	Ischichuca Creek			
Harringtonia	H. argentinica	Agua de la Peña Creek.			
Heidiphyllum	H. clarifolium				
Heidiphyllum	H. elongatum	Ischigualasto Provincial Park (San Juan Province), Gualo (La Rioja Province)	Leaf fragments	A voltzialean conifer.	
Heidiphyllum	H. minutifolium				
Kurtziana	K. cachuetensis	Ischigualasto Provincial Park (San Juan Province)	Frond fragments	Possible cycads.	
Pelourdea	P. polyphylla	Agua de la Peña Creek.			
Pelourdea	P. problematica	Agua de la Peña Creek.			
Phoenicopsis	P. sp.	Ischichuca Creek			
Pterorrachis	P. ambigua	Agua de la Peña Creek.			
Rissikia	R. media	Ischigualasto Provincial Park (San Juan Province), Gualo (La Rioja Province)	Leaf fragments	A podocarp conifer.	
Samaropsis	S. sp.	Gualo (La Rioja Province)	Seeds	Cordaitalean conifer seeds.	
Sphenobaiera	S. argentinae	Ischigualasto Provincial Park (San Juan Province)	Leaf fragments	A ginkgoalean.	
Sphenobaiera	S. sp. cf. S. argentinae	Gualo (La Rioja Province)	Leaf fragments	A ginkgoalean.	
Sphenobaiera	S. insecta	Ischigualasto Provincial Park (San Juan Province)	Leaf fragments	A ginkgoalean.	
Sphenobaiera	S. sectina	Ischigualasto Provincial Park (San Juan Province)	Leaf fragments	A ginkgoalean.	
Sphenopteris	S. sp.	Ischichuca Creek			
Telemachus	T. elongatus	Ischichuca Creek	Seed cones.	A voltzialean conifer.	
Yabeiella	Y. brackebuschiana	Ischigualasto Provincial Park (San Juan Province)	Leaf fragments	A gymnosperm of uncertain affinities.	
Yabeiella	Y. mareyesiaca			A gymnosperm of uncertain affinities.	
Yabeiella	Y. spathulata			A gymnosperm of uncertain affinities.	

==== Other plants ====
Non-gymnosperm plant macrofossils of the Los Rastros Formation
Genus	Species	Locality	Material	Notes	Images
Cladophlebis	C. kurtzi	Agua de la Peña Creek.		Osmundacean ferns	
Cladophlebis	C. mendozaensis	Ischigualasto Provincial Park (San Juan Province), Agua de la Peña Creek.	Frond fragments	Osmundacean ferns	
Cladophlebis	C. mesozoica	Agua de la Peña Creek.		Osmundacean ferns	
Cladophlebis	C. sp. cf. C. mesozoica	Gualo (La Rioja Province)	Frond fragments	Osmundacean ferns	
Equisetites	E. fertilis	Agua de la Peña Creek.		Small equisetales (horsetails)	
Neocalamites	N. carrerei	Ischichuca Creek.		Large equisetales (horsetails)	
Neocalamites	N. ischigualasti	Agua de la Peña Creek.		Large equisetales (horsetails)	
Neocalamites	N. ramaccionii	Agua de la Peña Creek.		Large equisetales (horsetails)	
Neocalamites	N. sp.	Ischigualasto Provincial Park (San Juan Province), Gualo (La Rioja Province), Ischichuca Creek.	Stalk impressions	Large equisetales (horsetails)	
Nododendron	N. sp.	Ischichuca Creek.		Equisetales (horsetails)	
Phyllotheca	P. australis	Agua de la Peña Creek.		Small equisetales (horsetails)	
Pleuromeia	P. sp.	Ischichuca Creek.		Small lycopods.	

== See also ==
- List of dinosaur-bearing rock formations
  - List of stratigraphic units with theropod tracks
- Chañares Formation
- Santa Maria Formation
- Omingonde Formation
