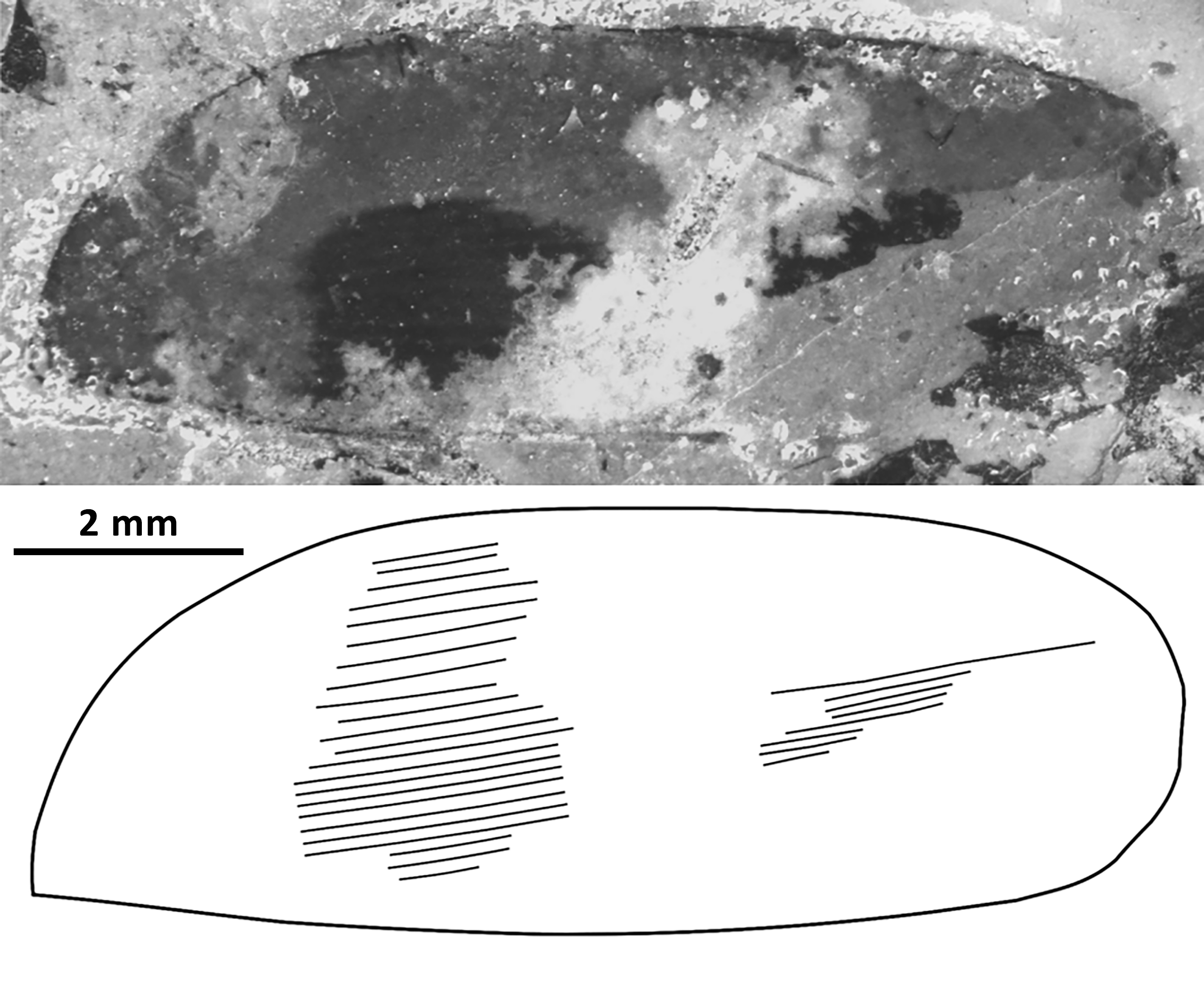
- Holotype of Dinoharpalus coptoclavoides, photograph and illustration

Scientific classification
- Kingdom: Animalia
- Phylum: Arthropoda
- Clade: Pancrustacea
- Class: Insecta
- Order: Coleoptera
- Suborder: †Protocoleoptera
- Superfamily: †Permosynoidea
- Family: †Permosynidae; Tillyard, 1924

Genera
- See text

= Permosynidae =

Permosynidae Temporal range: 268.0 to 122.46 Ma

Extinct family of beetles

Permosynidae is an extinct family of beetles known from the Middle Permian to Early Cretaceous. It is sometimes treated as a form family, because all known members were described from fossils of isolated elytra with punctate striae.

== Taxonomy ==
After:

- Alveolacupes Lin, 1983 (also spelled Alveolicupes)
  - Alveolacupes primus Lin, 1983 – Sanqiutang Formation, China, Late Triassic (Rhaetian)
  - Alveolacupes secundes Lin, 1983 – Sanqiutang Formation, China, Late Triassic (Rhaetian)
- Artematopodites Ponomarenko, 1990
  - Artematopodites crispulus Yan in Yan and Zhang, 2010 – Sharteg Formation, Mongolia, Late Jurassic (Tithonian)
  - Artematopodites insculptus (Zhang, 1997) – Sangonghe Formation, China, Early Jurassic (Toarcian); Xishanyao Formation, China, Middle Jurassic (Aalenian/Bajocian)
  - Artematopodites latissimus Ponomarenko, 2014 – Sharteg Formation, Mongolia, Late Jurassic (Tithonian)
  - Artematopodites latus Ponomarenko, 1990 – Byankino Formation, Russia, Late Jurassic (Tithonian)
  - Artematopodites lepidus Yan in Yan and Zhang, 2010 – Sharteg Formation, Mongolia, Late Jurassic (Tithonian)
  - Artematopodites leskoviensis Yan in Yan and Zhang, 2010 – Leskovskaya Formation, Russia, Early Cretaceous (Barremian)
  - Artematopodites longus (Hong, 1983) – Jiulongshan Formation, China, Middle-Late Jurassic (Callovian/Oxfordian)
  - Artematopodites lozowskii Ponomarenko, 2015 – Vokhma Formation, Russia, Late Permian (Changhsingian)
  - Artematopodites major Ponomarenko, 1990 – Turga Formation, Russia, Early Cretaceous (Aptian)
  - Artematopodites maximus Yan in Yan and Zhang, 2010 – Sharteg Formation, Mongolia, Late Jurassic (Tithonian)
  - Artematopodites prolixus (Zhang, 1997) – Badaowan Formation, China, Early Jurassic (Hettangian/Sinemurian)
  - Artematopodites propinquus (Zhang, 1997) – Badaowan Formation, China, Early Jurassic (Hettangian/Sinemurian)
  - Artematopodites shaanbeiensis Hong, 1995 – Huachi-Huanhe Formation, China, Early Cretaceous (Valanginian)
- Bistrisyne Lin, 1986
  - Bistrisyne tenua Lin, 1986 – Sanqiutang Formation, China, Late Triassic (Rhaetian)
- Delpuentesyne Martins-Neto and Gallego, 2007
  - Delpuentesyne menendezi Martins-Neto and Gallego, 2007 – Potrerillos Formation, Argentina, Middle Triassic (Ladinian)
- Diarcuipenna Lin, 1986
  - Diarcuipenna bennettitophila Ponomarenko, 2011 – Lunz Formation, Austria, Late Triassic (Carnian)
  - Diarcuipenna heterosa Lin, 1986 – Zijiachong Formation, China, Late Triassic (Norian)
- Dinoharpalus Handlirsch, 1906
  - Dinoharpalus coptoclavoides Ponomarenko, 2015 – Hassberge Formation, Germany, Late Triassic (Carnian)
  - Dinoharpalus latus Ponomarenko, 2015 – Vokhma Formation, Russia, Late Permian (Changhsingian)
  - Dinoharpalus liasinus (Giebel, 1856) – Cotham Formation, England, Late Triassic (Rhaetian)
  - Dinoharpalus martynovi Ponomarenko, 2018 – Salarevo Formation, Russia, Late Permian (Changhsingian)
  - Dinoharpalus rugosus Ponomarenko, 1985 – Osinovo Formation, Russia, Early-Middle Jurassic (Toarcian/Aalenian)
- Dzeregia Ponomarenko, 1985
  - Dzeregia ampla Ponomarenko, 1990 – Mangutskaya Formation, Russia, Early Cretaceous (Berriasian)
  - Dzeregia byrrhoides Ponomarenko, 1990 – Ukurei Formation, Russia, Late Triassic (Lithonian)
  - Dzeregia crassa Ponomarenko, 1990 – Turga Formation, Russia, Early Cretaceous (Aptian)
  - Dzeregia juxta (Lin, 1986) – Zijiachong Formation, China, Late Triassic (Norian)
  - Dzeregia lata Ponomarenko, 1985 – Makarova Formation, Russia, Early Jurassic (Toarcian)
  - Dzeregia longa Ponomarenko, 1985 – Tersyukskaya Formation, Russia, Middle Jurassic (Bajocian)
  - Dzeregia pilula Ponomarenko, 1990 – Turga Formation, Russia, Early Cretaceous (Aptian)
  - Dzeregia platis Ponomarenko, 2014 – Sharteg Formation, Mongolia, Late Jurassic (Tithonian)
  - Dzeregia striata Ponomarenko, 1985 – Zhargalant Formation, Mongolia, Early Jurassic (Toarcian)
- Hydrobiites Heer, 1865
  - Hydrobiites anglicus Handlirsch, 1906 – Hasfield, England, Late Triassic (Rhaetian)
  - Hydrobiites bellus (Geinitz, 1894) – Dobbertin, Mecklenburg-Vorpommern, Germany, Early Jurassic (Toarcian)
  - Hydrobiites convexus Ponomarenko, 1985 – Tersyukskaya Formation, Russia, Middle Jurassic (Bajocian)
  - Hydrobiites crassus Ponomarenko, 1985 – Cheremkhovskaya Formation, Russia, Early Jurassic (Toarcian)
  - Hydrobiites dobbertinensis Handlirsch, 1939 – Dobbertin, Mecklenburg-Vorpommern, Germany, Early Jurassic (Toarcian)
  - Hydrobiites giebeli Handlirsch, 1906 – Cotham Formation, England, Late Triassic (Rhaetian)
  - Hydrobiites handlirschi Ponomarenko, 2011 – Lunz Formation, Austria, Late Triassic (Carnian)
  - Hydrobiites liasinus (Giebel, 1856) – Hasfield, England, Late Triassic (Rhaetian)
  - Hydrobiites longus Ponomarenko, 1990 – Kutinskaya Formation, Russian, Early Cretaceous (Barremian)
  - Hydrobiites minor Ponomarenko, 2014 – Sharteg Formation, Mongolia, Late Jurassic (Tithonian)
  - Hydrobiites minutissimus Ponomarenko, 1985 – Itat Formation, Russia, Middle Jurassic (Bajocian/Bathonian)
  - Hydrobiites mongolicus Ponomarenko, 2014 – Sharteg Formation, Mongolia, Late Jurassic (Tithonian)
  - Hydrobiites permianus Ponomarenko, 2018 – Salarevo Formation, Russia, Late Permian (Changhsingian)
  - Hydrobiites punctatostriatus Handlirsch, 1939 – Dobbertin, Mecklenburg-Vorpommern, Germany, Early Jurassic (Toarcian)
  - Hydrobiites purbeccensis (Giebel, 1856) – Lulworth Formation, England, Early Cretaceous (Berriasian)
  - Hydrobiites sulcatus Ponomarenko, 1986 – Gurvan-Eren Formation, Mongolia, Early Cretaceous (Aptian)
  - Hydrobiites tillyardi Ponomarenko, 2011 – Vyazniki Formation, Russia, Late Permian (Changhsingian)
  - Hydrobiites veteranus (Heer, 1852) – Insektenmergel Formation, Switzerland, Early Jurassic (Hettangian)
  - Hydrobiites vladimiri Ponomarenko, 2011 – Vyazniki Formation, Russia, Late Permian (Changhsingian)
- Ischichucasyne Martins-Neto and Gallego, 2005
  - Ischichucasyne cladocosta Martins-Neto and Gallego, 2009 – Los Rastros Formation, Argentina, Late Triassic (Carnian)
  - Ischichucasyne santajuanaensis Martins-Neto and Gallego, 2005 – Santa Juana Formation, Chile, Late Triassic (Carnian)
- Palademosyne Rohdendorf, 1961
  - Palademosyne martynovae Rohdendorf, 1961 – Kazankovo-Markinskaya Formation, Russia, Middle Permian (Wordian)
  - Palademosyne natalensis Ponomarenko, 2005 – Estcourt Formation, South Africa, Late Permian (Changhsingian)
- Permocrossos Martynov, 1932
  - Permocrossos elongatus Martynov, 1932 – Iva-Gora Beds Formation, Russia, Middle Permian (Roadian)
- Permosyne Tillyard, 1924
  - Permosyne affinis Tillyard, 1924 – Croudace Bay Formation, Australia, Late Permian (Changhsingian)
  - Permosyne belmontensis Tillyard, 1924 – Croudace Bay Formation, Australia, Late Permian (Changhsingian)
  - Permosyne dentata Ponomarenko, 2003 – Salarevo Formation, Russia, Late Permian (Changhsingian)
  - Permosyne elongata Ponomarenko, 2005 – Estcourt Formation, South Africa, Late Permian (Changhsingian)
  - Permosyne mitchelli Tillyard, 1924 – Croudace Bay Formation, Australia, Late Permian (Changhsingian)
  - Permosyne rasnitsyni Ponomarenko, 2011 – Vyazniki Formation, Russia, Late Permian (Changhsingian)
- Platycrossos Dunstan, 1923
  - Platycrossos caroli Ponomarenko, 2011 – Lunz Formation, Austria, Late Triassic (Carnian)
  - Platycrossos elongatus Ponomarenko, 1985 – Itat Formation, Russia, Middle Jurassic (Bajocian/Bathonian)
  - Platycrossos latus Ponomarenko, 2014 – Sharteg Formation, Mongolia, Late Jurassic (Tithonian)
  - Platycrossos ligulatus Dunstan, 1923 – Blackstone Formation, Australia, Late Triassic (Norian)
  - Platycrossos longus Ponomarenko, 2014 – Sharteg Formation, Mongolia, Late Jurassic (Tithonian)
  - Platycrossos loxonicus Ponomarenko, 2014 – Sharteg Formation, Mongolia, Late Jurassic (Tithonian)
  - Platycrossos mongolicus Ponomarenko, 2014 – Sharteg Formation, Mongolia, Late Jurassic (Tithonian)
  - Platycrossos ovum Ponomarenko, 2014 – Sharteg Formation, Mongolia, Late Jurassic (Tithonian)
  - Platycrossos petalus Ponomarenko, 1985 – Itat Formation, Russia, Middle Jurassic (Bajocian/Bathonian)
  - Platycrossos punctatus Ponomarenko, 1985 – Itat Formation, Russia, Middle Jurassic (Bajocian/Bathonian)
  - Platycrossos subtumidus Dunstan, 1923 – Blackstone Formation, Australia, Late Triassic (Norian)
  - Platycrossos tumidus (Tillyard, 1916) – Blackstone Formation, Australia, Late Triassic (Norian)
- Pseudorhynchophora Handlirsch, 1906
  - Pseudorhynchophora convexa Ponomarenko, 2008 – Nyadeita Formation, Russia, Early Triassic (Olenekian)
  - Pseudorhynchophora olliffi Handlirsch, 1906 – Blackstone Formation, Australia, Late Triassic (Norian)
- Sakmaracoleus Ponomarenko, 2013
  - Sakmaracoleus orenburgensis Ponomarenko, 2013 – Vyazovka Formation, Russia, Middle Permian (Capitanian)
- Tychtocoleus Rohdendorf, 1961
  - Tychtocoleus europaeus (Ponomarenko, 2003) – Salarevo Formation, Russia, Late Permian (Changhsingian)
  - Tychtocoleus neuburgae Rohdendorf, 1961 – Gramoteinskaya Formation, Russia, Late Permian (Wuchiapingian)
  - Tychtocoleus popovi Ponomarenko, 2018 – Salarevo Formation, Russia, Late Permian (Changhsingian)
- Umkomaasia Zeuner, 1960
  - Umkomaasia depressa Zeuner, 1960 – Molteno Formation, South Africa, Late Triassic (Carnian)
