= Eocorona =

Eocorona Temporal range: Carnian

Scientific classification
- Domain: Eukaryota
- Kingdom: Animalia
- Phylum: Arthropoda
- Class: Insecta
- (unranked): Amphiesmenoptera
- Family: †Eocoronidae
- Genus: †Eocorona; Tindale, 1981
- Species: †E. iani

Binomial name
- †Eocorona iani Tindale, 1981

Extinct genus of insects

Eocorona is an extinct genus of amphiesmenopteran from the Middle Triassic of Australia. It contains only one species, Eocorona iani, and is the type genus of the family Eocoronidae.

== Discovery ==
Eocorona iani was first described by the Australian anthropologist and entomologist Norman Tindale in 1980. The fossil was composed of a nearly complete forewing and a hindwing tentatively interpreted as belonging to the same species. It was recovered from Mount Crosby, Queensland, Australia. It dates from the Carnian age (228.0 – 216.5 million years ago) of the Middle Triassic.

== Taxonomy ==
Eocorona iani is the only species in the genus Eocorona and the family Eocoronidae. Tindale originally described Eocorona iani as a butterfly (order Lepidoptera). This has been challenged by a number of other authors.

Most recently, Minet et al. (2010) considered Eocorona a 'true' member of the superorder Amphiesmenoptera, neither lepidopteran (butterflies and moths) nor trichopteran (caddisflies).

== See also ==
- Prehistoric insects
- Prehistoric Lepidoptera
