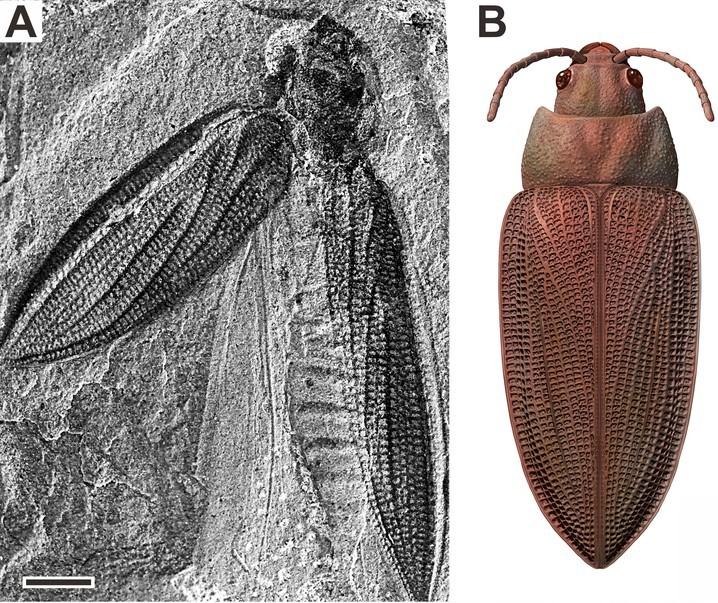
- Fossil and life restoration of Moravocoleus permianus

Scientific classification
- Kingdom: Animalia
- Phylum: Arthropoda
- Clade: Pancrustacea
- Class: Insecta
- Order: Coleoptera
- Suborder: †Protocoleoptera
- Superfamily: †Tshekardocoleoidea
- Family: †Tshekardocoleidae; Rohdendorf, 1944

Genera
- See text

Synonyms
- Uralocoleidae G. Zalessky, 1947; Moravocoleidae Kukalová-Peck & Beutel, 2012

= Tshekardocoleidae =

Tshekardocoleidae Temporal range: Cisuralian–Guadalupian

Extinct family of beetles

Tshekardocoleidae is an extinct family of stem group beetles, known from the Early Permian. They represent some of the earliest known beetles. They first appeared during the Cisuralian, before becoming extinct at the beginning of the Guadalupian. A claimed Jurassic record is doubtful. Like other primitive beetles, they are thought to have been xylophagous. The oldest known beetle, Coleopsis, was originally assigned to this family, but is now assigned to its own family Coleopsidae.

The Tshekardocoleidae are thought to have retained several plesiomorphies (ancestral characters) of Coleoptera in a broad sense. For instance, their elytra are flattened, lack epipleura (outer margins), cover the body loosely, and their tips extend beyond the apex of the abdomen. Their abdomens have a nearly cylindrical shape and are thought to have been flexible, apparently being able to strongly contract and expand. In extant beetles, the elytra are tight-fitting, forming a subelytral space which is absent in Tshekardocoleidae. The elytra also have remnants of veins, and have rows of "window punctures" between them. Such window punctures are also present in other stem-group beetle families, but in extant beetles are present only in Cupedidae and Ommatidae.

== Taxonomy ==
undescribed Tshekardocoleid larvae, Tshekarda site

Kirejtshuk (2020) included the following genera in Tshekardocoleidae

- †Avocoleus Ponomarenko, 1969 – Obora site (Early Permian, Sakmarian, 295 to 290.1 Ma); Moravia, Czech Republic
  - †Avocoleus fractus (Kukalová, 1969) (Type species)
  - †Avocoleus neglegens (Kukalová, 1969)
- †Boscoleus Kukalová, 1969 – Obora site (Early Permian, Sakmarian, 295 to 290.1 Ma); Moravia, Czech Republic
  - †Boscoleus blandus Kukalová, 1969 (Type species)
- †Eocoleus Kukalová, 1969 – Obora site (Early Permian, Sakmarian, 295 to 290.1 Ma); Moravia, Czech Republic
  - †Eocoleus scaber Kukalová, 1969 (Type species)
- †Moravocoleus Kukalová, 1969 – Obora site (Early Permian, Sakmarian, 295 to 290.1 Ma); Moravia, Czech Republic
  - †Moravocoleus permianus Kukalová, 1969 (Type species)
- †Permocoleus Lubkin & Engel, 2005 – Midco Member (Early Permian, Artinskian, 290.1 to 279.3 Ma); Noble County, Oklahoma, USA
  - †Permocoleus wellingtoniensis Lubkin & Engel, 2005 (Type species)
- †Prosperocoleus Kukalová, 1969 – Obora site (Early Permian, Sakmarian, 295 to 290.1 Ma); Moravia, Czech Republic
  - †Prosperocoleus prosperus Kukalová, 1969 (Type species)
- †Retelytron Kukalová, 1965 – Obora site (Early Permian, Sakmarian, 295 to 290.1 Ma); Moravia, Czech Republic
  - †Retelytron conopeum Kukalová, 1965 (Type species)
- †Sylvacoleodes Ponomarenko, 1963 – Tshekarda site (Early Permian, Kungurian, 295 to 290.1 Ma); Suksun, Perm Krai, Russia
  - †Sylvacoleodes admirandus Ponomarenko, 1963 (Type species)
- †Sylvacoleus Ponomarenko, 1963 – Tshekarda site (Early Permian, Kungurian, 295 to 290.1 Ma); Suksun, Perm Krai, Russia
  - †Sylvacoleus richteri Ponomarenko, 1963 (Type species)
  - †Sylvacoleus sharovi Ponomarenko, 1963
- †Tshekardocoleus Rohdendorf, 1944 – Tshekarda site (Early Permian, Kungurian, 295 to 290.1 Ma); Suksun, Perm Krai, Russia
  - †Tshekardocoleus magnus Rohdendorf, 1944 (Type species)
  - †Tshekardocoleus minor Ponomarenko, 1963
- †Umoricoleus Kukalová, 1969 – Obora site (Early Permian, Sakmarian, 295 to 290.1 Ma); Moravia, Czech Republic
  - †Umoricoleus perplex Kukalová, 1969 (Type species)
- †Votocoleus Kukalová, 1969 – Obora site (Early Permian, Sakmarian, 295 to 290.1 Ma); Moravia, Czech Republic
  - †Votocoleus submissus Kukalová, 1969 (Type species)

The genus Uralocoleus had been placed in the family by some authors, but the type species Uralocoleus splendens Zalessky 1947 was considered incertae sedis by Kirejtshuk (2020), as the type specimen is in bad condition and cannot be reliably compared with other members of the family, and the second species placed in the genus "Uralocoleus" ultimus was rejected from placement in Uralocoleus and listed as "genus incertus" ultimus Ponomarenko, 2000, because it was based on an isolated elytron that could either belong to a beetle or a cockroach. The genus Dictyocoleus, described from the Jurassic and containing only the type species Dictyocoleus jurassicus Hong, 1982, was originally placed in the family but was excluded by Kirejtshuk (2020).
