= Eocoronidae =

Eocoronidae Temporal range: Carnian

Scientific classification
- Kingdom: Animalia
- Phylum: Arthropoda
- Clade: Pancrustacea
- Class: Insecta
- Clade: Aparaglossata
- Superorder: Panorpida
- (unranked): Amphiesmenoptera
- Family: †Eocoronidae; Tindale, 1981

Type genus
- †Eocorona Tindale, 1981

Extinct family of insects

Eocoronidae is an extinct family of insects from the Carnian age of the Triassic period. It was established in 1981 by the Australian entomologist Norman Tindale. At present, it contains only one species and genus: Eocorona iani.

The taxonomical placement of Eocoronidae is unclear. Originally considered to belong to the order Lepidoptera, it is now assumed to be basal and is classified under Amphiesmenoptera.

Fossils of Eoses triassica, previously classified under the monotypic family Eosetidae and subjectively synonymized by E.F. Reik into the mecopteran species Mesochorista proavita, have been proposed by Tindale to belong to this family.
