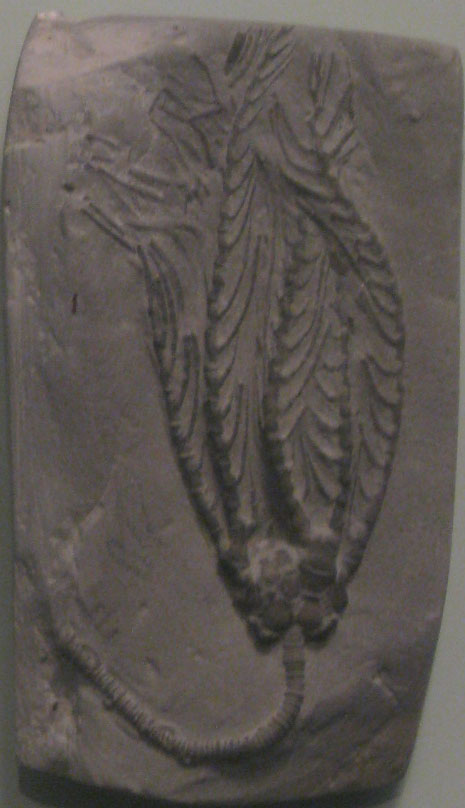
- Decadocrinus depressus on display at Smithsonian Museum of Natural History

Scientific classification
- Kingdom: Animalia
- Phylum: Echinodermata
- Class: Crinoidea
- Family: †Decadocrinidae
- Genus: †Decadocrinus; Wachsmuth & Springer, 1879

= Decadocrinus =

Decadocrinus Temporal range: Early Carboniferous

Extinct genus of crinoids

Decadocrinus is an extinct genus of crinoids from the Early Carboniferous of Europe and North America.

The following species are assigned to this genus:

- Decadocrinus crassidactylus Laudon, 1936
- Decadocrinus pachydactylus Laudon, 1936
- Decadocrinus spinulifer Laudon, 1936
- Decadocrinus subhemisphericus Moore & Plummer, 1940
