= Ademosynidae =

Ademosynidae Temporal range: Carnian–Aptian

Scientific classification
- Kingdom: Animalia
- Phylum: Arthropoda
- Class: Insecta
- Order: Coleoptera
- Suborder: incertae sedis
- Family: †Ademosynidae; Ponomarenko, 1968

Extinct family of beetles

Ademosynidae is an extinct family of beetles, known from the Late Triassic to Early Cretaceous. There are at least six genera and 11 species in Ademosynidae. Members of the family were small oval beetles, with a length generally smaller than 1 centimetre (0.39 in). Characteristics of the family include a pronotum without anterior angles and a rounded anterior margin, and elytra with 9–12 punctate striae. The systematic position of the family within the order Coleoptera is currently uncertain: they can be considered early examples of the suborder Polyphaga, or unusual examples of Archostemata. Ademosynidae has sometimes been synonymized with the older family Permosynidae, even though the latter was established based on fossils of isolated elytra and the former was established based on fossils of complete bodies.

== Genera ==
The family Ademosynidae is restricted to the following six genera and 11 species in Yan, Beutel and Ponomarenko (2017):

- † Ademosyne Handlirsch, 1906
  - †Ademosyne bacca Ponomarenko, 1969 – Madygen Formation, Kyrgyzstan, Late Triassic (Carnian)
  - †Ademosyne elliptica Ponomarenko, 1969 – Madygen Formation, Kyrgyzstan, Late Triassic (Carnian)
  - †Ademosyne kirghizica Ponomarenko, 1969 – Madygen Formation, Kyrgyzstan, Late Triassic (Carnian)
  - †Ademosyne major Handlirsch, 1906 – Blackstone Formation, Australia, Late Triassic (Norian)
- † Cephalosyne Ponomarenko, 1969 – Madygen Formation, Kyrgyzstan, Late Triassic (Carnian)
  - †Cephalosyne capitata Ponomarenko, 1969
- † Dolichosyne Ponomarenko, 1969 – Madygen Formation, Kyrgyzstan, Late Triassic (Carnian)
  - †Dolichosyne confragosa Ponomarenko, 1969
  - †Dolichosyne rostrata Ponomarenko, 1969
  - †Dolichosyne sulcata Ponomarenko, 1969
- † Gnathosyne Ponomarenko, 1969 – Tologoi Formation, Kazakhstan, Late Triassic (Norian)
  - †Gnathosyne akkolkensis Ponomarenko, 1969
- † Petrosyne Ponomarenko, 1969 – Kyrgyzstan, Early Jurassic (Pliensbachian)
  - †Petrosyne liassica Ponomarenko, 1969
- † Sphaerosyne Ponomarenko, 1969 – Zaza Formation, Russia, Early Cretaceous (Aptian)
  - †Sphaerosyne globosa Ponomarenko, 1969

The following genera and species are also included in the family according to Fossilworks, but are excluded or not mentioned in Yan, Beutel and Ponomarenko (2017). Some of these species, for instance those of Ademosynoides and those of Ademosyne described by Tillyard and Dunstan, were described from fossils of isolated elytra.

- † Ademosynoides Dunstan, 1923
  - †Ademosynoides abnormis Dunstan, 1923 – Blackstone Formation, Australia, Late Triassic (Norian)
  - †Ademosynoides alternata Dunstan, 1923 – Blackstone Formation, Australia, Late Triassic (Norian)
  - †Ademosynoides angusta (Tillyard, 1916) – Blackstone Formation, Australia, Late Triassic (Norian)
  - †Ademosynoides antarctica Zeuner, 1959 – Mount Flora Formation, Antarctica, Middle Jurassic (Bathonian)
  - †Ademosynoides japonicus Fujiyama, 1973 – Mononoki Formation, Japan, Late Triassic (Carnian)
  - †Ademosynoides magnifica Dunstan, 1923 – Blackstone Formation, Australia, Late Triassic (Norian)
  - †Ademosynoides minor (Handlirsch, 1906) – Blackstone Formation, Australia, Late Triassic (Norian)
  - †Ademosynoides obtusa (Tillyard, 1916) – Blackstone Formation, Australia, Late Triassic (Norian)
  - †Ademosynoides striatella Dunstan, 1923 – Blackstone Formation, Australia, Late Triassic (Norian)
- † Atalosyne Ren, 1995 – Lushangfen Formation, China, Early Cretaceous (Aptian)
  - †Atalosyne sinuolata Ren, 1995
- † Chaocoleus Ponomarenko, Yan & Huang, 2014 – Yinping Formation, China, Permian (Capitanian)
  - †Chaocoleus limnebius Ponomarenko, Yan & Huang, 2014
- † Eremisyne Wang, 1998 – Xiazhuang Formation, China, Early Cretaceous (Aptian/Albian)
  - †Eremisyne xiazhuangensis Wang, 1998
- † Grammositus Dunstan, 1923 (also spelled Grammositum) – Blackstone Formation, Australia, Late Triassic (Norian)
  - †Grammositus bilineatus Dunstan, 1923
- †"Ademosyne" adunca Dunstan, 1923 – Blackstone Formation, Australia, Late Triassic (Norian)
- †"Ademosyne" arcucciae Martins-Neto and Gallego, 2006 – Los Rastros Formation, Argentina, Late Triassic (Carnian)
- †"Ademosyne" australiensis Tillyard, 1916 – Blackstone Formation, Australia, Late Triassic (Norian)
- †"Ademosyne" brevis Dunstan, 1923 – Blackstone Formation, Australia, Late Triassic (Norian)
- †"Ademosyne" cameroni Tillyard, 1916 – Blackstone Formation, Australia, Late Triassic (Norian)
- †"Ademosyne" congener Tillyard, 1916 – Blackstone Formation, Australia, Late Triassic (Norian)
- †"Ademosyne" curvata Dunstan, 1923 – Blackstone Formation, Australia, Late Triassic (Norian)
- †"Ademosyne" elongatus Martins-Neto and Gallego, 2006 – Los Rastros Formation, Argentina, Late Triassic (Carnian)
- †"Ademosyne" hexacostata Martins-Neto and Gallego, 2006 – Los Rastros Formation, Argentina, Late Triassic (Carnian)
- †"Ademosyne" intermedia Dunstan, 1923 – Blackstone Formation, Australia, Late Triassic (Norian)
- †"Ademosyne" lata Dunstan, 1923 – Blackstone Formation, Australia, Late Triassic (Norian)
- †"Ademosyne" llantenesensis Brauckmann et al., 2010 – Llantenes Formation, Argentina, Late Triassic (Norian)
- †"Ademosyne" olliffi (Handlirsch, 1906) – Blackstone Formation, Australia, Late Triassic (Norian)
- †"Ademosyne" parva Dunstan, 1923 – Blackstone Formation, Australia, Late Triassic (Norian)
- †"Ademosyne" polyzetete Ponomarenko, 2011 – Lunz Formation, Austria, Late Triassic (Carnian)
- †"Ademosyne" prisca Riek, 1974 – Molteno Formation, South Africa, Late Triassic (Carnian)
- †"Ademosyne" punctata Tillyard, 1916 – Blackstone Formation, Australia, Late Triassic (Norian)
- †"Ademosyne" punctuada Martins-Neto and Gallego, 2006 – Los Rastros Formation, Argentina, Late Triassic (Carnian)
- †"Ademosyne" ramocostata Dunstan, 1923 – Blackstone Formation, Australia, Late Triassic (Norian)
- †"Ademosyne" reducta Riek, 1976 – Molteno Formation, South Africa, Late Triassic (Carnian)
- †"Ademosyne" rosenfeldi Brauckmann et al., 2010 – Llantenes Formation, Argentina, Late Triassic (Norian)
- †"Ademosyne" rugulosa Dunstan, 1923 – Blackstone Formation, Australia, Late Triassic (Norian)
- †"Ademosyne" sibirica Rohdendorf, 1961 – Gramoteinskaya Formation, Kemerovo Oblast, Russia, Late Permian (Wuchiapingian/Changhsingian)
- †"Ademosyne" speciosa Riek, 1974 – Molteno Formation, South Africa, Late Triassic (Carnian)
- †"Ademosyne" umutu Martins-Neto and Gallego, 2009 – Los Rastros Formation, Argentina, Late Triassic (Carnian)
- †"Ademosyne" vittamargina Dunstan, 1923 – Blackstone Formation, Australia, Late Triassic (Norian)
- †"Ademosyne" wianamattensis Tillyard, 1918 – Ashfield Shale, Australia, Middle Triassic (Pelsonian/Illyrian)
