= Zentrum für Biodokumentation =

Coordinates: 49°21′00″N 7°06′41″E

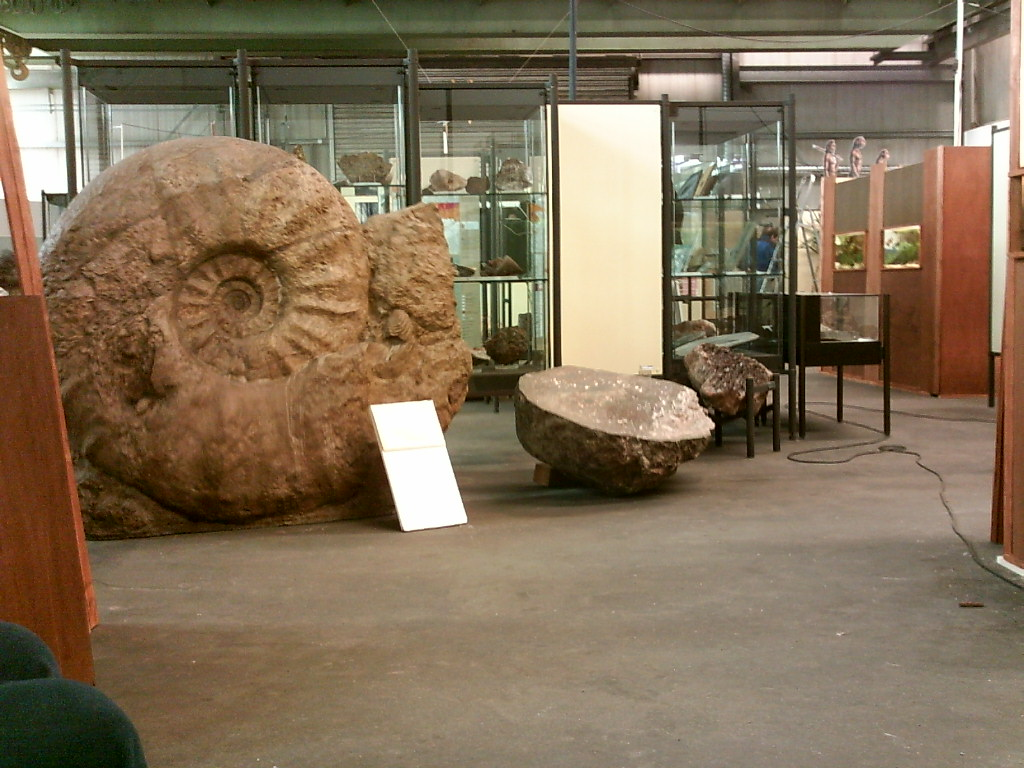
A copy of the largest known ammonite fossil in the world.

Zentrum für Biodokumentation is a museum in Saarland, Germany.
