= Marko Vincenc Lipold =

Slovenian geologist, mountaineer, and mining engineer

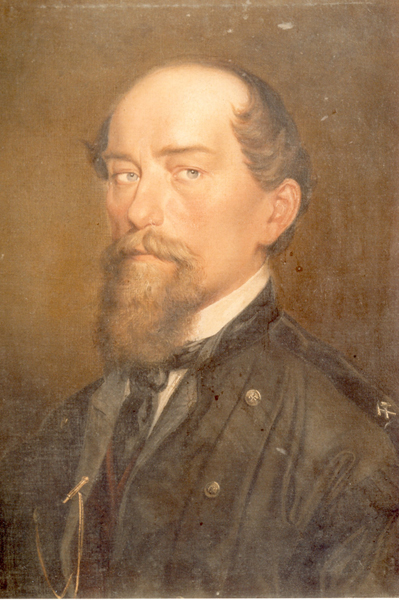

Marko Vincenc Lipold Germanized as Markus Vinzenz Lipold (19 January 1816 – 22 April 1883) was a Slovenian geologist, mountaineer, and mining engineer.

Lipold was born in Mozirje, son of a merchant. He studied at Celje and he paid for his own education from an early age by working as a tutor for the sons of the district commissioner. In 1833 he completed high school and went to Graz studying what was then termed as philosophy. In 1835 he studied law, first at the University of Graz, and then at the University of Vienna where he graduated in law in 1839. With a scholarship from Archduke Johann he studied mining at the Schemnitz Mining Academy (Banská Štiavnica). From 1841 to 1844 he worked on the geological recording for the Imperial Court in Vienna. He studied mineralogy under Wilhelm Karl Ritter von Haidinger and in 1847 he became a mining master at Hall in Tyrol. He married Flora Harnisch. Lipold then moved to Upper Styria and in 1849 he joined the State Geological Survey in Vienna, working again under Haidinger. This involved field work across the region. He also climbed several peaks in the Tyrol and made altitude measurements in the mountains. In 1855 he attended the Congress of Naturalists. In 1867 he was appointed director to a mercury mine in Idrija after he was not elevated to the position of first geologist following the death of Franz von Hauer. After the death of Flora, he married her cousin Rosa Webern in 1868.
