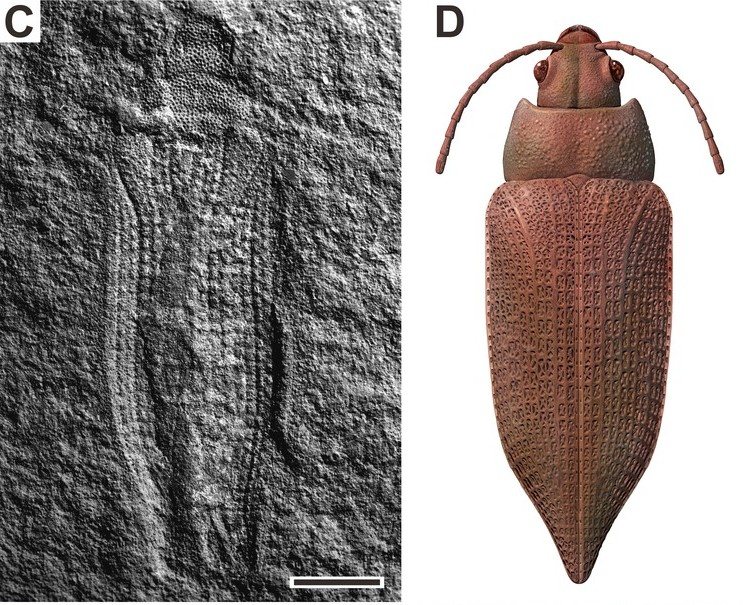
- Fossil and life restoration of Permocupes sojanensis

Scientific classification
- Kingdom: Animalia
- Phylum: Arthropoda
- Class: Insecta
- Order: Coleoptera
- Suborder: †Protocoleoptera
- Superfamily: †Permocupedoidea
- Family: †Permocupedidae; Martynov, 1933

Genera
- See text

Synonyms
- Kaltanocoleidae Rohdendorf, 1961

= Permocupedidae =

Permocupedidae Temporal range: Cisuralian–Anisian

Extinct family of beetles

Permocupedidae is an extinct family of protocoleopteran stem group beetles. They first appeared during the Early Permian, and were one of the dominant groups of beetles during the Middle Permian. They became rare in the Late Permian, with only one species known from the Triassic, Frankencupes ultimus from the Middle Triassic (Anisian) Röt Formation of Germany. They are thought to have been xylophagous (wood eating), which is presumed to be the ancestral ecology of beetles.

== Taxonomy ==
Kirejtshuk (2020) included the following genera in an expanded (sensu lato) family, with the traditional (sensu stricto) Permocupedidae and related Taldycupedidae as subfamilies Permocupedinae and Taldycupedinae respectively. However, other studies have recovered Talycupedidae as more closely related to crown-group beetles than to Permocupedidae.

- Afrocupes Geertsema & van den Heever, 1996 – South Africa: Western Cape (Kenmoore Farm), Whitehill Formation, Permian, Cisuralian, Sakmarian/Artinskian, −290.1–279.5 Ma.
  - Afrocupes firmae Geertsema & van den Heever, 1996 (Type species)
- Archicupes Rohdendorf, 1961 (syn Palaeocupes Rohdendorf, 1961) – Russia, Kemerovo Region (Kaltan), Mitina Formation, Permian, Cisuralian/Guadalupian, Kungurian/Roadian (Cisuralian/Biarmian, Kungurian/Kazanian), −272.5–268.0 Ma
  - Archicupes jacobsoni Rohdendorf, 1961 (Type species)
  - "Archicupes" reichardti Rohdendorf, 1961 – considered indeterminate to genus by Kirejtshuk (2020)
- Cytocupoides Ponomarenko, 1969 – Russia: Kemerovo Region (Kaltan), Mitina Formation, Permian, Cisuralian/Guadalupian, Kungurian/Roadian (Cisuralian/Biarmian, Kungurian/Kazanian), −272.5–268.0 Ma.
  - Cytocupoides longatus Ponomarenko, 1969 (Type species)
- Cytocupes Rohdendorf, 1961 – Russia: Kemerovo Region (Kaltan), Mitina Formation, Permian, Cisuralian/Guadalupian, Kungurian/Roadian (Cisuralian/Biarmian, Kungurian/Kazanian), −272.5–268.0 Ma.
  - Cytocupes angustus Rohdendorf, 1961 (Type species)
- Eocupes Rohdendorf, 1961 – Russia: Kemerovo Region (Kaltan), Mitina Formation, Permian, Cisuralian/Guadalupian, Kungurian/Roadian (Cisuralian/Biarmian, Kungurian/Kazanian), −272.5–268.0 Ma).
  - Eocupes cellulosus Ponomarenko, 1969
  - Eocupes lukjanovitshi Rohdendorf, 1961 (Type species)
- Frankencupes Ponomarenko & Bashkuev, 2018 – Germany: Gambach am Main (Lower Franconia), Röt Formation, Middle Triassic, Olenekian/Anisian, −247.2–242.0 Ma.
  - Frankencupes ultimus Ponomarenko & Bashkuev, 2018 (Type species)
- Ichthyocupes Rohdendorf, 1961 – Russia: Kemerovo Region (Kaltan), Mitina Formation, Permian, Cisuralian/Guadalupian, Kungurian/Roadian (Cisuralian/Biarmian, Kungurian/Kazanian), −272.5–268.0 Ma; Kemerovo Region, Gramoteinskaya Formation (Tykhta River, Sokolova, Kutsnetsk Basin), Permian, Lopingian, Wuchiapingian/Changhsingian (Tatarian, Severodvinian/Vyatkian), −259.0–252.3 Ma.
  - Ichthyocupes kuznetskiensis Ponomarenko, 1969 – Mitina Formation
  - Ichthyocupes skoki (Rohdendorf, 1961) – Gramoteinskaya Formation
  - Ichthyocupes tyzhnovi Rohdendorf, 1961 (Type species) – Mitina Formation
- Kaltanocoleus Rohdendorf, 1961 – Russia: Kemerovo Region (Kaltan), Mitina Formation, Permian, Cisuralian/Guadalupian, Kungurian/Roadian (Cisuralian/Biarmian, Kungurian/Kazanian), −272.5–268.0 Ma.
  - Kaltanocoleus pospelovi Rohdendorf, 1961 (Type species)
- Kaltanicupes Rohdendorf, 1961 – Russia: Kirov Region (Kityak), Belebeevo Formation, Permian, Cisuralian/Guadalupian, Kungurian/Roadian (Cisuralian/Biarmian, Kungurian/Kazanian), −272.5–268.0 Ma; Orenburg Region (Kargala), Amanak Formation, Permian, Guadalupian/Lopingian, Capitanian/Wuchiapingian (Tatarian, Sweverodvinian), −265.0–259.0 Ma; Kemerovo Region (Kaltan), Mitina Formation, Permian, Cisuralian/Guadalupian, Kungurian/Roadian (Cisuralian/Biarmian, Kungurian/Kazanian), −272.5–268.0 Ma. One undescribed species of this genus was recorded from Indian Barakar Formation of the Lower Permian.
  - Kaltanicupes acutus Ponomarenko, 1963 – Belebeevo Formation
  - Kaltanicupes kargalensis Ponomarenko, 1963 – Amanak Formation
  - Kaltanicupes kitjakensis Ponomarenko, 1963 – Belebeevo Formation
  - Kaltanicupes richteri Rohdendorf, 1961 (Type species) – Mitina Formation
- Linicupes Ponomarenko, Yan & Huang, 2014 – China: Anhui (Houdong, Yinping Mountain, SW Chaohu City), Permian, Guadalupian/Lopingian, Capitanian/Wuchiapingian (Tatarian, Severodvinian/Vyatkian), −265.0–259.0 Ma.
  - Linicupes yinpinensis Ponomarenko, Yan & Huang, 2014 (Type species)
- Maricoleus Shcherbakov in Shcherbakov, Makarkin, Aristov & Vasilenko, 2009 – Russia, Primorsky Krai (Cape, Novosilsky, Russky Island), Lower Permian, Cisuralian, Artinskian/Kungurian (Cisuralian/Biarmian, Kungurian/Kazanian), −279.5–272.5 Ma.
  - Maricoleus valentinae Shcherbakov in Shcherbakov, Makarkin, Aristov & Vasilenko, 2009 (Type species)
- Permocupes Martynov, 1933 (syn Permocupoides Martynov, 1933) – Russia: Arkhangel'sk Region (Letopala River and Soyana), Iva-Gora Beds Formation, Permian, Cisuralian/Guadalupian, Kungurian/Roadian (Cisuralian/Biarmian, Kungurian/Kazanian), −272.5–268.0 Ma; Udmurtia (Chepanikha, Rossokha River Valley), Permian, Guadalupian, Wordian (Biarmian, Urzhumian), −268.0–265.0 Ma: Tatarstan (Mendeleevsk District, Tikhie Gory), Baitugan Formation, Permian, Cisuralian/Guadalupian, Kungurian/Roadian (Cisuralian/Biarmian, Kungurian/Kazanian), −272.5–268.0 Ma.
  - Permocupes distinctus (Martynov, 1933) – Baitugan Formation
  - Permocupes grandis Ponomarenko, 1963 – Iva-Gora Beds Formation
  - Permocupes latus Ponomarenko, 2013 – Chepanikha, Rossokha River Valley
  - Permocupes semenovi Martynov, 1933 (Type species) – Baitugan Formation
  - Permocupes sojanensis Ponomarenko, 1963 – Iva-Gora Beds Formation
- Pintolla Kirejtshuk, 2020 – Brazil: Rio Grande do Sul (Road Cut on Road BR 290 near Minas do Leao), Irati Formation, Permian, Cisuralian, Artinskian/Kungurian (Cisuralian/Biarmian, Kungurian/Kazanian), −279.5–272.5 Ma.
  - Pintolla ponomarenkoi (Pinto, 1987) (Type species)
- Protocupoides Rohdendorf, 1961 (syn Tomiocupes Rohdendorf, 1961, Tricupes Rohdendorf, 1961) – Russia: Vologda Region (Isady locality, Mutovino), Poldarsa Formation, Permian, Lopingian, Wuchiapingian/Changhsingian (Tatarian, Severodvinskian/Vyatkian), −259.0–254.0 Ma; Udmurtia (Chepanikha, Rossokha River Valley), Permian, Guadalupian, Wordian (Biarmian, Urzhumian), −268.0–265.0 Ma; Kemerovo Region (Sokolova, Kutsnetsk Basin), Gramoteinskaya Formation, Permian, Lopingian, Wuchiapingian/Changhsingian (Tatarian, Severodvinian/Vyatkian), −259.0–252.3 Ma; Kemerovo Region (Kaltan), Mitina Formation, Permian, Cisuralian/Guadalupian, Kungurian/Roadian (Cisuralian/Biarmian, Kungurian/Kazanian), −272.5–268.0 Ma.
  - Protocupoides acer (Rohdendorf, 1961) – Gramoteinskaya Formation
  - Protocupoides carinatus (Rohdendorf, 1961) – Gramoteinskaya Formation
  - Protocupoides elongatus Ponomarenko, 2013 – Chepanikha, Rossokha River Valley
  - Protocupoides esini Ponomarenko, 2013 – Poldarsa Formation
  - Protocupoides plavilstshikovi Rohdendorf, 1961 – Mitina Formation
  - Protocupoides sharovi (Rohdendorf, 1961) – Mitina Formation
  - "Protocupoides" rohdendorfi Pinto, 1987 – Brazil: Rio Grande do Sul (Road Cut on Road BR 290 near Minas do Leao), Irati Formation, Permian, Kungurian, −279.5–272.5 Ma; considered indeterminate to genus by Kirejtshuk (2020)
- Tatarocupes Ponomarenko, 2004 – Russia: Orenburg Region (Novo-Aleksandrovka), Permian, Guadalupian/Lopingian, Capitanian/Wuchiapingian (Tatarian, Severodvinian), −265.0–259.0 Ma.
  - Tatarocupes granulatus Ponomarenko, 2004 (Type species)
- Uralocupes Ponomarenko, 1969 – Russia: Belebeevo Formation Kirov Region (Kityak), Permian, Cisuralian/Guadalupian, Kungurian/Roadian (Cisuralian/Biarmian, Kungurian/Kazanian), −272.5–268.0 Ma.
  - Uralocupes major (Ponomarenko, 1963) (Type species)
