= Decadocrinidae =

Scientific classification
- Kingdom: Animalia
- Phylum: Echinodermata
- Class: Crinoidea
- Family: †Decadocrinidae; Bather, 1890

Fossil family of crinoids

Decadocrinidae is an extinct family of crinoids.

The following genera, all extinct, are assigned to the family:

- Acylocrinus Kirk, 1947
- Decadocrinus Wachsmuth & Springer, 1879
- Eidosocrinus Webster & Jell, 1999
- Eireocrinus Wright, 1951
- Glaukosocrinus Strimple, 1951
- Grabauicrinus Waters, Maples, Lane, Marcus, Liao, Liu, Hou & Wang, 2003
- Holcocrinus Kirk, 1945
- Trautscholdicrinus Yakovlev, 1939
