= Lunz Formation =

Geologic formation in Austria and Slovakia

- Stratigraphic range: Carnian
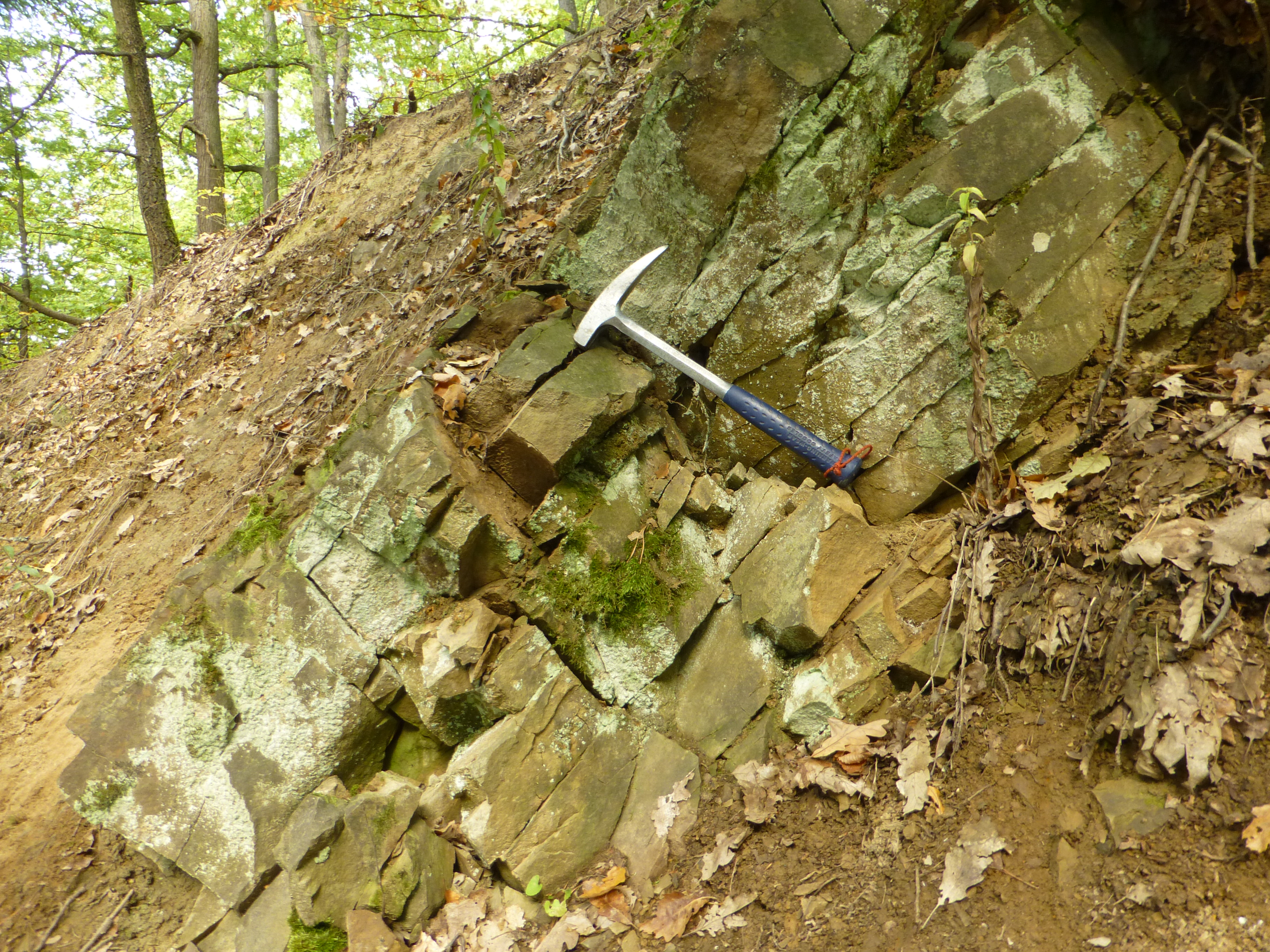
- Lunz Sandstone from the area east of Uhrovec Village, Strážovské vrchy Mts, Slovakia. Hronic Považie nappe. Sandstone appears in the middle of the dolomite complex. Hammer 38 cm long.
- Type: Formation
- Underlies: Main Dolomite
- Overlies: Wetterstein Formation

Lithology
- Primary: sandstone, shale
- Other: coal

Location
- Country: Austria; Slovakia

Type section
- Named for: Lunz am See
- Named by: M.V. Lipold

The Lunz Formation is a geologic formation in Austria and other Tethyan regions. It is composed of quartz sandstone, shales and claystones, locally with coal interbeds. The basal part of the formation may contain marine fossils. It preserves fossils dated to the Carnian stage of the Triassic period and represents significant siliciclastic input into the European carbonate shelf due to the Carnian Pluvial Event.

Formation is traditionally divided into 3 members (Lunz Sandstone, Coal-bearing shales and Upper Sandstone), this concept was later modified and Trachyceras Beds and Reingraben shales were included into the basal part of the formation:

- Trahyceras Beds (Trachycerasschichten, Aonschichten) represented by dark, often bituminous limestone and calcareous shale alteration containing abundant Trachyceratitic ammonites
- Reingraben shales (Reingrabener Schiefer) often described as grey to black shales with Halobia bivalves
- Main sandstone (Lunzer Hauptsandstein) - grey, brown to green sandstones (feldspar greywacke or arkose) in the basal part, representing thickest part of the formation
- Coal-bearing clayey shales in the middle part
- Upper sandstone (Lunzer Hangendsandstein) - considerably thinner quartz sandstones in the upper part of the formation

The Lunz Formation overlies the Ladinian-Carnian Wetterstein Formation and is covered by the Norian Main Dolomite.

Formation was originally defined by M.V. Lipold as Lunzer Schichten, according to Austrian town Lunz am See. It occurs in the Northern Calcareous Alps, Western Carpathians. The Lunz Formation of the Northern Calcareous Alps is well known for well preserved Carnian flora - the so-called Lunz Flora.

== See also ==
- List of fossiliferous stratigraphic units in Austria
