= Denmark Hill Insect Bed =

- Stratigraphic range: Carnian
- Type: Geological formation
- Unit of: Blackstone Formation
- Underlies: Bluff coal seam
- Overlies: Aberdare coal seam
- Thickness: 15 cm (5.9 in)

Lithology
- Primary: Shale

Location
- Coordinates: 27.6°S 152.8°E
- Approximate paleocoordinates: 59.0°S 105.8°E
- Region: Ipswich
- Country: Australia

Type section
- Named for: Denmark Hill
- Denmark Hill Insect Bed (Australia) Denmark Hill Insect Bed (Queensland)

The Denmark Hill Insect Bed is a Triassic fossil locality in the Denmark Hill Conservation Park of Ipswich, Queensland, Australia.

== Description ==
It belongs to the Blackstone Formation (Ipswich Coal Measures Group) dated to the Carnian age (228.0 - 216.5 million years ago). Its coordinates are 27.6°S 152.8°E. Its paleogeographic coordinates are 59.0°S 105.8°E.

The fossiliferous layer is located in between the Bluff coal seam and the Aberdare coal seam. It is 15 cm (5.9 in) thick and is composed greenish grey to brownish grey arenaceous shale. The existence of coal seams above and below the layer indicates that it may have once been a lake (lacustrine environment).

The site is noted as a source of well-preserved insect fossils.

== See also ==
- List of fossil sites
- Chañares Formation, fossiliferous formation of the Ischigualasto-Villa Unión Basin, Argentina
- Ischigualasto Formation, contemporaneous fossiliferous formation of the Ischigualasto-Villa Unión Basin
- Molteno Formation, contemporaneous fossiliferous formation of Lesotho and South Africa
- Pebbly Arkose Formation, contemporaneous fossiliferous formation of Botswana, Zambia and Zimbabwe
