= Reingrabener Schiefer =

Geologic formation in Austria

- Stratigraphic range: Triassic
- Type: Formation

Lithology
- Primary: Shale

Location
- Country: Austria, Slovakia

Type section
- Named by: F. v. Hauer

The Reingrabener Schiefer (other names Reingraben Shales, „Halobienschiefer“) is a lithostratigraphic unit, often described as independent geologic formation, or as a member of Lunz Formation. Reingraben shales are represented by black-brown or black, hard clayey shales and marly shales. Often contains spherosiderite nodules.

The Reingrabener Schiefer outcrop in the Alps and the Carpathians. It preserves fossils dated to the Triassic period.

== See also ==
- List of fossiliferous stratigraphic units in Austria
