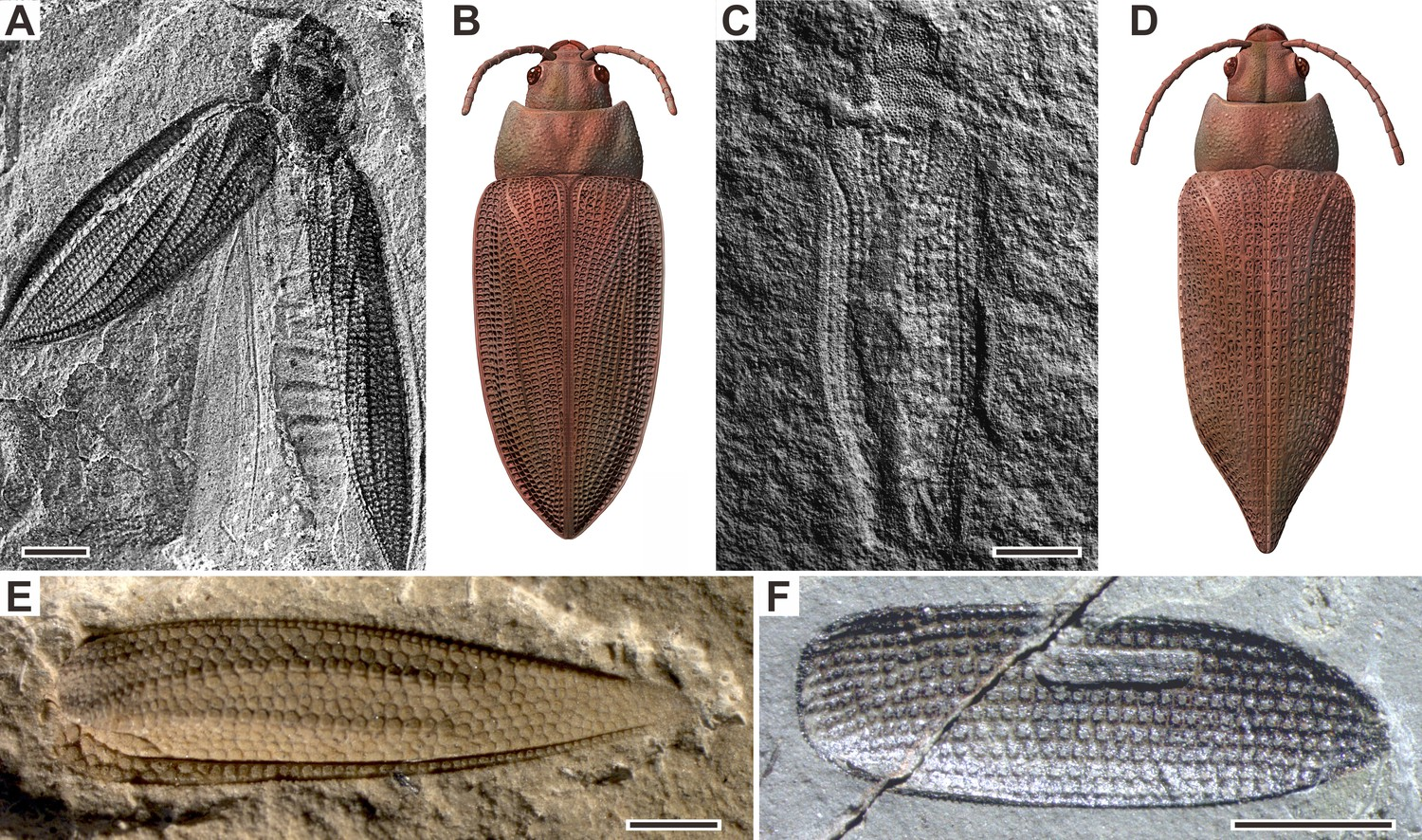
- (A, B) Moravocoleus permianus (Tshekardocoleidae) (C, D) Permocupes sojanensis (Permocupedidae) (E) Tshekardocoleidae, Sylvacoleus richteri (F) Taldycupedidae, Taldycupes reticulatus

Scientific classification
- Kingdom: Animalia
- Phylum: Arthropoda
- Clade: Pancrustacea
- Class: Insecta
- Order: Coleoptera
- Suborder: †Protocoleoptera; Tillyard, 1924

Families and genera
- †Coleopsis; †Tshekardocoleidae; †Permocupedidae; †Taldycupedidae; †Ademosynidae; †Permosynidae; †Rhombocoleidae; †Triadocupedidae; †Asiocoleidae; †Peltosynidae

= Protocoleoptera =

Protocoleoptera Temporal range: Asselian–Anisian

Extinct suborder of beetles

The Protocoleoptera are a paraphyletic group of extinct beetles, containing the earliest and most primitive lineages of beetles. They represented the dominant group of beetles during the Permian, but were largely replaced by modern beetle groups during the following Triassic. Protocoleopterans typically possess prognathous (horizontal) heads, distinctive elytra with regular window punctures, cuticles with tubercles or scales, as well as a primitive pattern of ventral sclerites, similar to the modern archostematan families Ommatidae and Cupedidae. They are thought to have been xylophagous and wood boring.

== Nomenclature ==
Protocoleoptera was originally proposed by Robert John Tillyard in 1924 for the extinct genus Protocoleus, assigned to the family Protocoleidae. Protocoleus is now considered a member of the extinct order Protelytroptera (a stem-group of the modern Dermaptera, the earwigs), which would make Protocoleoptera in this sense a synonym of the order. Roy Crowson later reused the name "Protocoleoptera" to refer to Early Permian beetles such as the Tshekardocoleidae, while establishing the Archecoleoptera for Late Permian beetles. Because Protocoleoptera in its original sense is a synonym of Protelytroptera, Cai et al. (2022) proposed a replacement name, Alphacoleoptera Engel, Cai & Tihelka, 2022. Some authors reject the use of Protocoleoptera and Archecoleoptera and include their members within a broad concept of the suborder Archostemata instead.

== Taxonomy ==
The taxonomic naming scheme of early beetles currently has no consensus, with several separate classification schemes proposed for higher level-clades within the stem-group. It is generally agreed that Tshekardocoleidae is the earliest diverging group among the major families.

- Coleoptera
  - †Coleopsis Kirejtshuk et al., 2014 (Early Permian)
  - †Tshekardocoleidae Rohdendorf, 1944 (Early Permian)
  - †Permocupedidae Martynov, 1933 (Early Permian–Middle Triassic)
  - †Taldycupedidae Rohdendorf, 1961 (Middle–Late Permian)
  - †Ademosynidae Ponomarenko, 1968 (Late Jurassic–Early Cretaceous)
  - †Permosynidae Tillyard, 1924 (Middle Permian–Early Cretaceous, form family?)
  - †Rhombocoleidae Rohdendorf, 1961 (Middle Permian–Early Cretaceous)
  - †Triadocupedidae Ponomarenko, 1966 (Middle–Late Triassic)
  - †Asiocoleidae Rohdendorf, 1961 (Middle Permian–Jurassic)
  - †Peltosynidae Yan, Beutel & Ponomarenko, 2017 (Middle–Late Triassic)
