= Rhynchosauroides =

Rhynchosauroides Temporal range: Triassic-Cretaceous ~252–89 Ma

Trace fossil classification
- Kingdom: Animalia
- Phylum: Chordata
- Class: Reptilia
- Ichnofamily: †Rhynchosauroidae
- Ichnogenus: †Rhynchosauroides; Maidwell 1911

Ichnospecies
- See text

Ichnogenus of reptile footprints

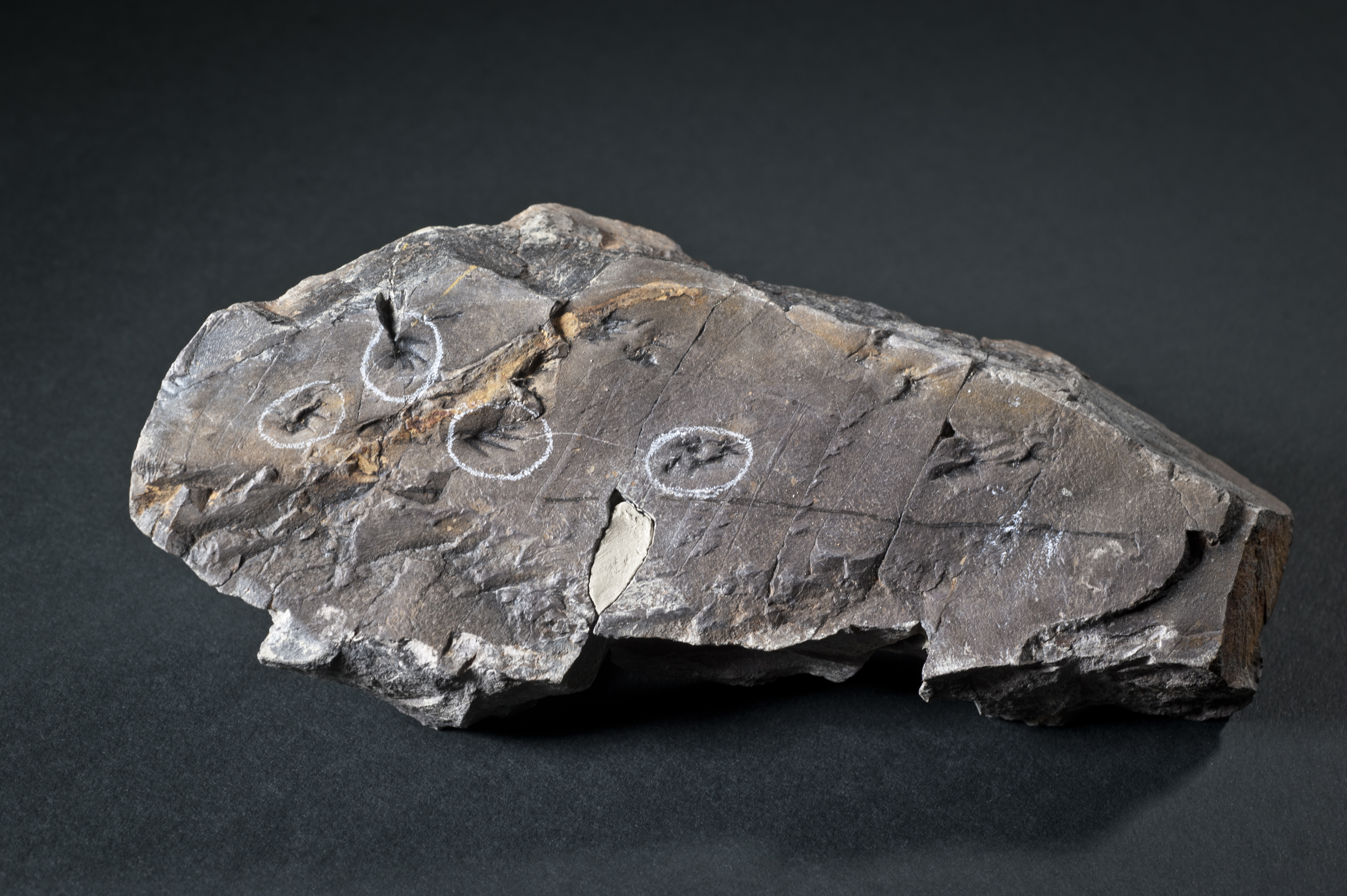
Rhynchosauroides isp., Natural History Museum University of Pisa

Rhynchosauroides is an ichnogenus, a form taxon based on footprints. The organism producing the footprints was likely a lepidosaur and may have been a sphenodont, an ancestor of the modern tuatara. The footprint consists of five digits, of which the fifth is shortened and the first highly shortened.

== Species ==
- R. beasleyi Nopsca, 1923
- R. bornemanni Haubold, 1966
- R. brunswickii Ryan and Willard, 1947
- R. gangresci da Silva et al., 2012
- R. hyperbates Baird, 1957
- R. kuletae Baird, 1957
- R. majus Demathieu, 1967
- R. maximus Gand, 1974
- R. minutipes Maidwell, 1914
- R. pallinii Conti et al., 1977
- R. palmatus Lull, 1942
- R. petri Demathieu, 1966
- R. pusillus Haubold, 1966
- R. rdzaneki Ptaszynski, 2000
- R. rectipes Beasley, 1911
- R. retroversipes da Silva et al., 2008
- R. santanderensis Demathieu and Saiz de Omeñaca, 1977
- R. schochardti von Lilienstern, 1939
- R. sphaerodactylus Demathieu, 1971
- R. tirolicus Abel, 1926
- R. triangulus Gand, 1977
- R. virgiliae Demathieu et al., 1978

== See also ==
- List of dinosaur ichnogenera
