= Blackstone Formation, Australia =

Stratigraphic layer in QLD, Australia

Blackstone Formation
- Stratigraphic range: Carnian-Norian; ~235–206 Ma
- Type: Geological formation
- Unit of: Ipswich Coal Measures
- Sub-units: Denmark Hill Insect Bed, Striped Bacon Seam Member
- Underlies: Unconformity with Raceview Formation and Aberdare Conglomerate
- Overlies: Tivoli Formation
- Thickness: 200–240 m (660–790 ft)

Lithology
- Primary: Shale
- Other: Siltstone, coal, tuff

Location
- Coordinates: 27.6°S 152.8°E
- Approximate paleocoordinates: 58.6°S 101.0°E
- Region: Ipswich
- Country: Australia

Type section
- Named for: Blackstone, Queensland
- Blackstone Formation, Australia (Australia) Blackstone Formation, Australia (Queensland)

The Blackstone Formation is a geologic formation of the Ipswich Coal Measures Group in southeastern Queensland, Australia, dating to the Carnian to Norian stages of the Late Triassic. The shales, siltstones, coal and tuffs were deposited in a lacustrine environment. The Blackstone Formation contains the Denmark Hill Insect Bed.

== Vertebrates ==
=== Lungfish ===
Dipnoans of the Blackstone Formation
Genus	Species	State	Abundance	Notes	Images
Ceratodus	C. robustus				

=== Invertebrates ===
Insects of the Blackstone Formation
Genus	Species	Location	Stratigraphic position	Material	Notes	Images
Mesochorista	M. proavita	Ipswich			A Permochoionid	
Mesodiphthera	M. grandis				Tettigarctid cicada	
Tardilly	T. dunstani				Tettigarctid cicada	
Tardilly	T. prosboloides				Tettigarctid cicada	
Phanerogramma	P. australis				Dermapterid earwig	
Dinmopsylla	D. semota	Dinmore clay pit			Archipsyllid Permopsocid	
Mesopsyche	M. triareolata	Dinmore clay pit			Mesopsychid mecopteran	

=== Ichnofossils ===
In 1964, dinosaur footprints were discovered from the Rhondda colliery (underground coal mine) 230 metres below ground along the sandstone ceiling of the Striped Bacon coal seam. These were initially described as Eubrontes, a type of predatory dinosaur (theropod) footprint. Later, these footprints were considered as evidence for the world's largest Triassic theropod, with legs towering over 2 metres tall. A 3D evaluation of the fossil indicated the footprint length was much smaller than previously reported (34 cm rather than 46 cm long) and its shape was characteristic of the trace fossil genus (ichnogenus) Evazoum. The existing hypothesis is that Evazoum were made by prosauropods, ancestral forms of long-necked sauropod dinosaurs. The bipedal dinosaur track-maker may have resembled the dinosaur Plateosaurus, and this fossil is the only evidence of this group of dinosaurs in Australia. The next evidence for sauropodomorphs in Australia comes over 50 million years later in the Jurassic.

== See also ==
- List of fossil sites
