= Timezgadiouine Formation =

Geological formation located in Morocco

- Stratigraphic range: Triassic, Olenekian? to Carnian or early Norian
- Type: Geological formation
- Unit of: Argana Group
- Sub-units: Tanamert Member (T3), Aglegal Member (T4), Irohalene Member (T5)
- Underlies: Bigoudine Formation
- Overlies: Ikakern Formation
- Thickness: 1,000–2,000 metres (3,300–6,600 ft)

Lithology
- Primary: mudstone, siltstone, sandstone
- Other: claystone, conglomerate, oolitic limestone

Location
- Region: Marrakesh-Safi, Souss-Massa
- Country: Morocco
- Extent: Argana Basin

Type section
- Named for: Timezgadiouine, Morocco
- Timezgadiouine Formation (Morocco)

The Timezgadiouine Formation, sometimes spelled as the Timesgadiouine Formation, is a Triassic geological formation in the Argana Basin of Morocco. It is a succession of red bed sediments spanning from the Olenekian to at least the Carnian, encompassing members T3 to T5 of the Argana Group. It is preceded by the Permian Ikakern Formation and succeeded by the Late Triassic Bigoudine Formation.

The formation is split into three members. The Early Triassic Tanamert Member (T3) is a relatively thin band of volcaniclastic conglomerate, likely emplaced by braided rivers. The Middle Triassic Aglegal Member (T4) is a thick sequence of muddy and silty cyclical deposits interspersed with wide sandstone lenses. It would have been deposited within a semi-arid playa, mudflat, and ephemeral lake system cut by meandering streams or sheet floods. The late Carnian (or possibly early Norian) Irohalene Member (T5) comprises bioturbated mudstone complemented by an increasing abundance of sandstone beds. This final member is likely equivalent to a more humid period with large permanent lakes or wide meandering rivers. The formation as a whole was deposited in a wide and tectonically stable basin, in contrast to the narrow rift basins which developed elsewhere along the present-day Central Atlantic margin during the Triassic.

The Timezgadiouine Formation is quite fossiliferous; footprints and other trace fossils are found throughout the entire strata, while skeletal material is common in the Irohalene Member. The fossil content of the Irohalene Member includes phytosaurs, aetosaurs, metoposauroid amphibians, stahleckeriid dicynodonts, early dinosauromorphs, and other typical Carnian to early Norian animals. Several animals are distinctive, such as the large herbivorous archosauromorph Azendohsaurus laaroussii, and massive three-toed footprints (Eubrontes sp.) emplaced by a Tyrannosaurus-sized archosaur.

== General geology ==
The Timezgadiouine Formation is part of the Argana Group, a long succession of red bed sediments deposited in the Argana Basin. The Argana Basin is a northeast-to-southwest oriented valley extending for about 85 km (53 mi) in the western part of the High Atlas. The Argana Group, sometimes known as the Argana Formation, includes most of the geological layers within the basin, separated into eight members, often labelled T1 to T8. Argana Group sediments generally have a shallow dip towards the west or northwest, though faulting can strongly alter this dip in some areas.

The Timezgadiouine Formation corresponds to members T3 (the Tanamert Member) T4 (the Aglegal Member) and T5 (the Irohalene member) of the Argana Group. The base of the Timezgadiouine Formation is separated from the underlying Permian-age Ikakern Formation (members T1-T2) via an angular unconformity. This unconformity may be a result of tectonic instability and erosion related to crustal thinning or post-orogenic collapse of the Variscan mountains. The end of the Timezgadiouine Formation appears to smoothly transition to the succeeding Late Triassic Bigoudine Formation (members T6-T8).

The Argana Basin is divided by a series of steep faults striking in an east-to-west direction. Early studies suggested that normal faults developed during several phases of north–south rifting in the Late Triassic, splitting up the basin into a series of uneven fault blocks. This was partially driven by the assumption that the entire Timezgadiouine Formation was Late Triassic in age, equivalent to rift basins in eastern North America and elsewhere in Morocco. These neighboring rift basins are typically characterized as half-grabens, associated with asymmetrical faulting and the breakup of Pangea.

However, later work argued that the Timezgadiouine Formation was deposited in a broad and tectonically stable basin, with subsidence controlled by gradual sediment loading throughout the Triassic, rather than local faulting or rifting in the Late Triassic specifically. The major east–west faults only affect Permian sediments, so they were likely emplaced during the unconformity between the Ikakern and Timezgadiouine formations. The Timezgadiouine Formation is affected by a few northeast–southwest striking faults, but they appear to have been emplaced after deposition. These later faults were likely a result of tectonic activity related to the Central Atlantic Magmatic Province. Both the east–west and northeast–southwest faults have been reactivated by recent mountain building. Once faulting has been accounted for, the depth of the Timezgadiouine Formation can be reconstructed as fairly uniform and symmetrical during its time of deposition.

== Sub-units ==
=== Tanamert Member (T3) ===
The Tanamert (or Tanameurt) Member, T3, is a quite thin section, only about 10 meters (33 feet) thick. This member consists of volcaniclastic conglomerate arranged into shallow, indistinct cross-beds. Rhyolite is the most common clast type, with smaller proportions of quartz, limestone, phyllite, and fine-grained sedimentary rocks. This conglomerate would have been deposited by braided rivers eroding older volcanic and sedimentary rocks from the Variscan orogeny. The only fossils known from the Tanamert Member are tetrapod footprints consistent with an Early Triassic (Olenekian?) age.

=== Aglegal Member (T4) ===
The Tanamert Member is overlain by the much thicker and more widespread Aglegal Member, T4, which consists of 800–1,500 meters (2,600–4,900 ft) of finer sediments. Most of the Aglegal Member by bulk is arranged into cyclical sequences of fine-grained sediments such as siltstone, mudstone, and clay. Each sequence is about two meters (6.6 feet) thick on average. They sometimes begin with a layer of oolitic limestone, laced with ripple marks, micrite pellets and quartz grains. The limestone is followed by thinly laminated and ripple-marked silty shale, consisting of mud pellets, silt, and fine sand. Laminated sediments are eventually broken up by mudcracks, giving way to a thick section of massive and warped paleosols with randomly dispersed calcareous nodules. Paleosols range from illite-rich claystone with wedge-shaped deformational structures, to mudcracked mudstone with a granular fabric.

Fine-grained sequences likely represent cycles of climate fluctuations. Periods of increasing humidity emplaced shallow, semi-ephemeral lakes (represented by limestone), later replaced with somewhat deeper bodies of water (represented by silty shale). Subsequent drying exposed and fractured the lakebeds, and the area transitioned into a system of semi-arid mudflats and playas which were occasionally supplied with water carrying fine sediments. As the clay and mud was frequently soaked and dried, it would have been processed and deformed into vertisols. Brackish water, seeping through the soil, deposited analcime and calcite, minerals which helped to preserve granular structures in mudstone. The mudcracked mudstone at the top of a sequence corresponds to a final drop in the water table, ending a period of sediment processing until humidity increases once more. It is assumed that the cycles are linked to axial precession during a tectonically stable time frame.

These fine cyclical sequences are randomly interrupted by tabular lenses of coarse sandstone, which can be continuous for up to 15 kilometers (9.3 miles). The sandstone can be identified as a lithic arenite, with a high amount of feldspar, mud pellets, and reprocessed rock alongside quartz grains. Trough cross-bedding and ripple laminations are common, as are burrows. The sandstone lenses may correspond to lag deposits from sheet floods or meandering streams. Both body fossils and ichnofossils occur, though they are rare. Ichnofossils include tetrapod tracks typical of the Middle Triassic, while body fossils include rare fragments of fish and capitosaurian amphibians. Ostracods and charophytes support a Middle Triassic age.

=== Irohalene Member (T5) ===
The youngest and most fossiliferous member of the Timezgadiouine Formation is the 200–500 meters (660–1,640 ft) thick Irohalene Member, T5. The lower part of this member is mainly silty mudstone arranged into even, continuous layers. Bioturbation is prominent, lending the mudstone a homogenous character without sedimentary structures or graded bedding. Further up in the member, sandstone beds become prevalent, starting with fine, calcite-rich sandstone with common ripple marks. These transition to coarser, evenly-bedded quartz sandstone with broader cross bedding. The relative thickness of mudstone-dominated and sandstone-dominated layers is strongly variable within the basin. The Irohalene Member likely corresponds to a lacustrine environment, dotted with brackish permanent lakes. The deepest lakes developed the thickest mud deposits, while shallower lakes or areas closer to shorelines developed sandbars. Alternating muddy and sandy intervals may also correspond to a floodplain and meandering river system.

Fossils are common near the base and top of the Irohalene Member. These include a diverse assortment of trace fossils and body fossils from both terrestrial and aquatic animals. The age of the Irohalene Member is universally considered to be within the Late Triassic. It has been labelled as "Otischalkian" (Late Carnian?) under the Land Vertebrate Faunachron system of Triassic tetrapod biostratigraphy. This was justified by the supposed presence of proposed Otischalkian index fossils such as Paleorhinus, Angistorhinus, Longosuchus, Placerias, and Metoposaurus. Ichnofossils and general sedimentological comparisons to other formations support this general age assessment.

However, the presence of clear Otischalkian index fossils in the Irohalene Member is debatable, as multiple Irohalene tetrapod species have been reclassified into endemic genera. For example, putative Moroccan species of Metoposaurus are now known as Arganasaurus and Dutuitosaurus, while Moroccan remains of Placerias may be placed into their own genus, Moghreberia. Supposed fossils of Longosuchus are now considered an indeterminate species of African aetosaur. Several proposed Otischalkian index fossils (namely Parasuchus and Angistorhinus) are paraphyletic or have a long temporal range extending into the early Norian in other regions. As a result, the Irohalene Member may be as young as the early Norian.

== Paleobiota ==
=== Reptiles ===
Color key: Taxon / Reclassified taxon / Taxon falsely reported as present / Dubious taxon or junior synonym / Ichnotaxon / Ootaxon / Morphotaxon	Notes; Uncertain or tentative taxa are in small text; ~~crossed out~~ taxa are discredited.

Reptiles of the Timezgadiouine Formation
Genus / Taxon	Species	Subunit	Notes	Images
Angistorhinus	A. talainti	upper Irohalene Member	A basal mystriosuchine phytosaur	Arganasuchus dutuiti Diodorus scytobrachion
Arganasuchus	A. dutuiti	lower Irohalene Member	A "rauisuchian" (basal loricatan) archosaur	Arganasuchus dutuiti Diodorus scytobrachion
Azendohsaurus	A. laaroussii	lower Irohalene Member	An azendohsaurid allokotosaur, originally misidentified as an ornithischian or "prosauropod" dinosaur.	Arganasuchus dutuiti Diodorus scytobrachion
Diodorus	D. scytobrachion	lower Irohalene Member	A silesaurid dinosauriform	Arganasuchus dutuiti Diodorus scytobrachion
Parasuchus	P. magnoculus	lower Irohalene Member	A basal ("Paleorhinus-grade") phytosaur based on a juvenile specimen. Previously placed into the genus Paleorhinus or given its own genus, Arganarhinus.	Arganasuchus dutuiti Diodorus scytobrachion
Paratypothoracisini indet.		lower Irohalene Member	An indeterminate aetosaur with blade-like spines on its lateral scutes. Originally referred to Longosuchus meadei, though later considered an indeterminate paratypothoracisine.	Arganasuchus dutuiti Diodorus scytobrachion
Phytosauria indet.		upper Irohalene Member	An indeterminate large phytosaur.	Arganasuchus dutuiti Diodorus scytobrachion
Procolophonidae indet.		lower Irohalene Member	Indeterminate procolophonid parareptiles.	Arganasuchus dutuiti Diodorus scytobrachion
"Prolacertiformes" indet.		lower Irohalene Member	Indeterminate "prolacertiforms" (basal archosauromorphs).	Arganasuchus dutuiti Diodorus scytobrachion

=== Synapsids ===
Color key: Taxon / Reclassified taxon / Taxon falsely reported as present / Dubious taxon or junior synonym / Ichnotaxon / Ootaxon / Morphotaxon	Notes; Uncertain or tentative taxa are in small text; ~~crossed out~~ taxa are discredited.

Synapsids of the Timezgadiouine Formation
Genus / Taxon	Species	Subunit	Notes	Images
Azarifeneria	A. barrati	lower Irohalene Member	A dubious dicynodont, likely synonymous with Moghreberia.	Moghreberia nmachouensis
Azarifeneria	A. robustus	lower Irohalene Member	A dubious dicynodont, likely synonymous with Moghreberia.	Moghreberia nmachouensis
Moghreberia	M. nmachouensis	lower Irohalene Member	A stahleckeriid dicynodont closely related to, and sometimes considered to be a species of, Placerias.	Moghreberia nmachouensis

=== Temnospondyls ===
Color key: Taxon / Reclassified taxon / Taxon falsely reported as present / Dubious taxon or junior synonym / Ichnotaxon / Ootaxon / Morphotaxon	Notes; Uncertain or tentative taxa are in small text; ~~crossed out~~ taxa are discredited.

Temnospondyls of the Timezgadiouine Formation
Genus / Taxon	Species	Subunit	Notes	Images
Almasaurus	A. habbazi	lower Irohalene Member	A latiscopid temnospondyl	Dutuitosaurus ouazzoui
Arganasaurus	A. azerouali	upper Irohalene Member	A metoposaurid temnospondyl, originally considered a species of Metoposaurus.	Dutuitosaurus ouazzoui
Arganasaurus	A. lyazidi	upper Irohalene Member	A metoposaurid temnospondyl, originally considered a species of Metoposaurus.	Dutuitosaurus ouazzoui
Capitosauria indet.		upper Aglegal Member	An indeterminate Cyclotosaurus-like temnospondyl.	Dutuitosaurus ouazzoui
Dutuitosaurus	D. oazzoui	lower Irohalene Member	A metoposaurid temnospondyl, originally considered a species of Metoposaurus.	Dutuitosaurus ouazzoui

=== Fish ===
Color key: Taxon / Reclassified taxon / Taxon falsely reported as present / Dubious taxon or junior synonym / Ichnotaxon / Ootaxon / Morphotaxon	Notes; Uncertain or tentative taxa are in small text; ~~crossed out~~ taxa are discredited.

Fish of the Timezgadiouine Formation
Genus / Taxon	Species	Subunit	Notes	Images
Actinopterygii indet.		lower Irohalene Member	Indeterminate actinoptergyians previously referred to Atopocephala, Perleidus, and Procheirichthys.	
Arganodus	A. atlantis	lower Irohalene Member	A ceratodontid lungfish, sometimes considered a species of Asiatoceratodus.	
Ceratodus	C. arganensis	lower Irohalene Member	A ceratodontid lungfish, sometimes considered a species of Asiatoceratodus.	
Coelacanthidae indet.		lower Irohalene Member	An indeterminate coelacanth	
Dipteronotus	D. gibbosus	Aglegal Member, lower Irohalene Member	A deep-bodied "perleidiform" neopterygian	
Mauritanichthys	M. rugosus	lower Irohalene Member	A redfieldiiform actinopterygian	
Redfieldiiformes indet.		lower Irohalene Member	An indeterminate redfieldiiform previously referred to Ischnolepis.	

=== Trace fossils ===
Apart from the following named ichnotaxa, complex tetrapod burrow systems have been described from the Aglegal Member. These burrows were likely created by small and gregarious procolophonids or therapsids, which also may have been the trackmakers responsible for Procolophonichnium tracks.

Color key: Taxon / Reclassified taxon / Taxon falsely reported as present / Dubious taxon or junior synonym / Ichnotaxon / Ootaxon / Morphotaxon	Notes; Uncertain or tentative taxa are in small text; ~~crossed out~~ taxa are discredited.

Ichnotaxa of the Timezgadiouine Formation
Ichnogenus / Ichnotaxon	Ichnospecies	Subunit(s)	Notes	Images
Apatopus	A. lineatus	Irohalene Member	Footprints and tracks likely created by phytosaurs.	
Atreipus-Grallator		Aglegal Member, Irohalene Member	Manus-pes track pairs likely created by small quadrupedal or facultatively bipedal dinosauromorphs, such as silesaurids.	
Brachychirotherium		Irohalene Member	Footprints and tracks likely created by large pseudosuchians, such as paracrocodylomorphs or aetosaurs.	
Chirotherium	C. barthii	Aglegal Member	Footprints and tracks likely created by euparkeriids or early archosaurs.	
Diplopodichnus		Irohalene Member	Trails likely created by multi-legged arthropods crawling over soft mud.	
Eubrontes		Irohalene Member	Footprints and tracks likely created by large to very large ("Tyrannosaurus size") bipedal archosaurs, such as theropods, sauropodomorphs, or poposauroids.	
Grallator		Irohalene Member	Footprints and tracks likely created by small to medium-sized bipedal archosaurs, such as theropods or poposauroids.	
cf. Helminthoidichnites		Irohalene Member	Shallow burrows likely created by worms or insect larvae moving near the surface through soft mud.	
Isochirotherium	I. coureli	Aglegal Member	Footprints and tracks likely created by archosauriforms such as proterochampsians or small pseudosuchians.	
Labyrintichnus	L. terrerensis	Irohalene Member	A maze-like system of burrows likely created by insect larvae.	
Parachirotherium	P. cf. postchirotheroides	Irohalene Member	Footprints and tracks likely created by facultatively bipedal dinosauromorphs.	
Procolophonichnium	P. haarmuehlensis	Aglegal Member	Footprints and tracks likely created by procolophonids, therapsids, or other small amniotes.	
Protochirotherium		Tanamert Member	Footprints and tracks likely created by early pseudosuchians or other archosauriforms.	
Rhynchosauroides		Tanamert Member, Aglegal Member, Irohalene Member	Footprints and tracks likely created by sprawling lepidosauromorphs or archosauromorphs.	
Rotodactylus		Aglegal Member	Footprints and tracks likely created by early dinosauromorphs, lagerpetids, or lepidosauromorphs.	
Scoyenia	S. gracilis	Irohalene Member	Striated burrows likely created by specialized arthropods or polychaete worms.	
Spongeliomorpha	S. cf. carlsbergi	Irohalene Member	Burrows likely created by arthropods tunneling through firm ground.	
Synaptichnium		Tanamert Member, Aglegal Member, Irohalene Member	Footprints and tracks likely created by early pseudosuchians or other archosauriforms.	
Taenidium	T. barretti	Irohalene Member	Burrows likely created by freshwater arthropods or worms.	
