= Arganasaurus =

Arganasaurus Temporal range: middle Carnian, 234–230 Ma
- Partial skull

Scientific classification
- Kingdom: Animalia
- Phylum: Chordata
- Clade: Tetrapoda
- Order: †Temnospondyli
- Suborder: †Stereospondyli
- Family: †Metoposauridae
- Genus: †Arganasaurus; Hunt, 1993

Type species
- †Metoposaurus lyazidi Dutuit, 1976

Species
- †Arganasaurus lyazidi Dutuit, 1976; †Arganasaurus azerouali?Dutuit, 1976

Extinct genus of temnospondyls

Arganasaurus is an extinct genus of temnospondyls belonging to the family Metoposauridae that lived in Morocco during the Late Triassic (Carnian).

== History of study ==
Material of the type species, A. lyazidi, was discovered in the Irohalene Member (T5) of the Timezgadiouine Formation (previously within the Argana Formation, now elevated to group status) in 1966 by M. Laaroussi (Service de la Carte Géologique du Maroc) at locality XIX at the village of Alma. The type locality is specifically at the top of the T5 unit. Dutuit (1976) provided a preliminary description of the taxon and material (then as 'Metoposaurus lyazidi'), which is named for Lyazid Imzilen who was involved in some of the fieldwork. He did not designate a holotype, and thus Hunt (1993) designated MNHN ALM 205 (XIX/3/66) as the lectotype while also placing the species in a new monotypic genus. Most of the specimens assigned to the taxon are partial to complete skulls with the exception of some pectoral elements, although Khaldoune et al. (2016) only list cranial material in the assigned material (and also list the lectotype as including a hemimandible). Buffa et al. (2019) provided the first description of the postcranial material of A. lyazidi.

Material of the second named species, A. azerouali, was discovered by Larbi Azeroual (who the species epithet honors), in the Irohalene Member at locality XV near the village of Imziln. Dutuit (1976) designated a holotype (MNHN.F.ARG.5), though some previous workers have considered there to be no formal holotype designation (e.g., Hunt, 1993, stated that Dutuit did not designate a holotype, and Schoch & Milner, 2000, list multiple specimens as syntypes), perhaps because Dutuit designated multiple specimens as holotypes. As such, MNHN.F.ARG.5 is sometimes listed as the lectotype of the taxon. The validity of this species was also more contested prior to Buffa et al.'s revision, with Hunt designating it as a nomen dubium, Schoch & Milner considering it valid, and some other workers leaving it in unresolved status.

== Anatomy ==
Both species are primarily known from cranial and hemimandibular material, although some pectoral elements are also known. Hunt (1993) diagnosed A. lyazidi as differing from all other metoposaurids in having a lacrimal that entered the nares and in having an otic notch of intermediate depth. In Buffa et al.'s (2019) revision of A. azerouali, they expanded Argansaurus to be multitaxic, retaining Hunt's features as diagnostic for A. lyazidi but proposing a separate diagnosis for the genus, which includes: (1) a subtriangular squamosal; (2) a shallow otic notch with bulge-like tabular horns; and (3) a posteroventrally angled occipital surface that is visible in dorsal view. Arganasaurus azerouali was then differentiated from A. lyazidi by (1) thick and massive cranial and postcranial bones; (2) a maxilla entering the orbit; (3) a lacrimal entering the orbit; (4) ornamentation with few ridges and a relatively poorly developed lateral line system except on the hemimandibles; (5) orbits in the anterior quarter of the interpterygoid vacuities; (6) a broad cultriform process that narrows anteriorly; (7) the absence of a splenial contribution to the symphysis; (8) subtriangular posterior Meckelian fenestrae; and (9) a large pitted zone of ornamentation in the pectoral girdle elements.

== Phylogenetic relationships ==
The monophyly of Arganasaurus (sensu Buffa et al., 2019) has been supported by phylogenetic analyses. The taxon is typically recovered near the base of Metoposauridae but later diverging than Dutuitosaurus, which occurs in the lower T5.

== See also ==
- Prehistoric amphibian
- List of prehistoric amphibians
