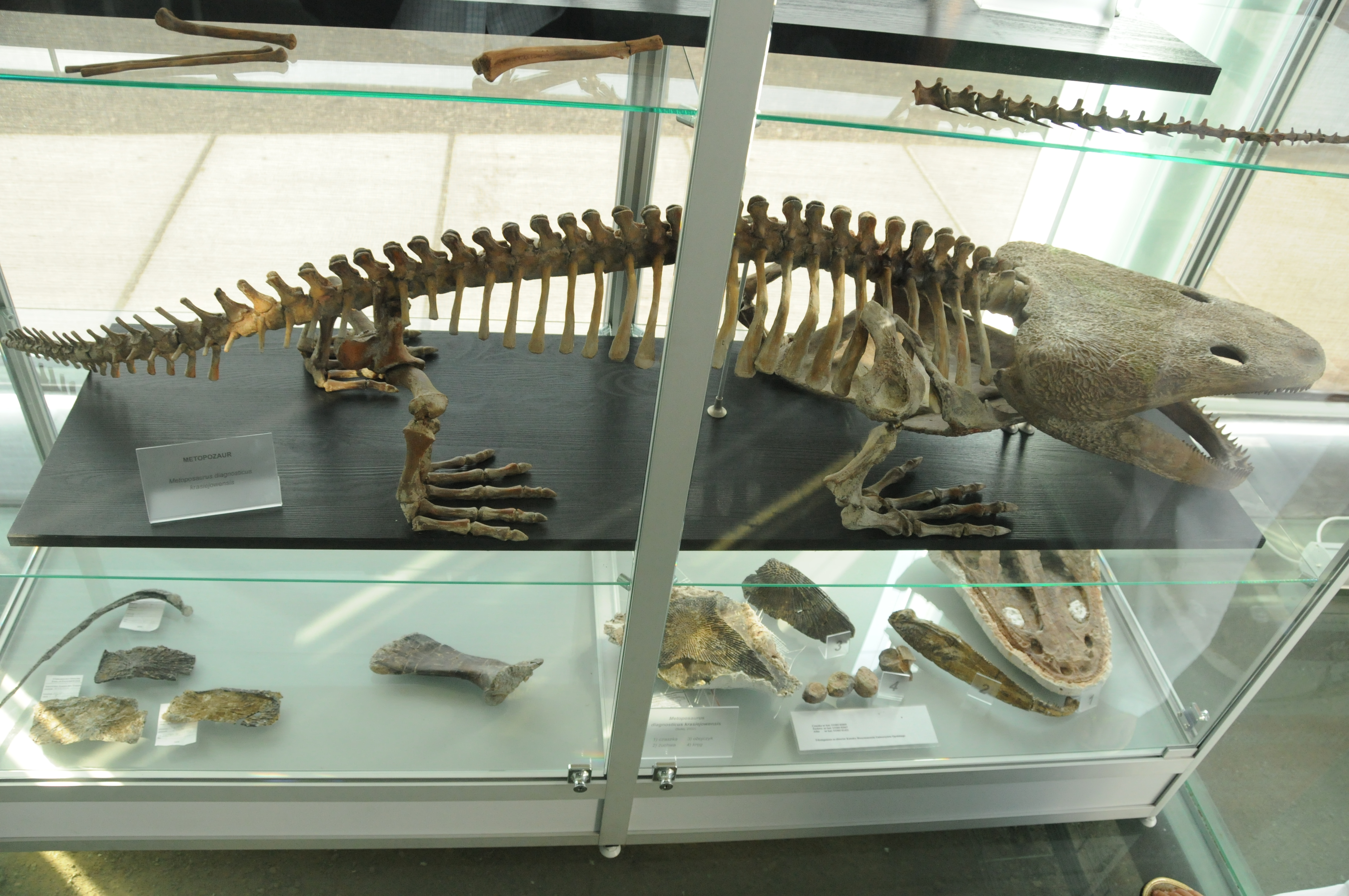
- Skeleton of Metoposaurus diagnosticus krasiejowensi in the Krasiejów museum in Poland
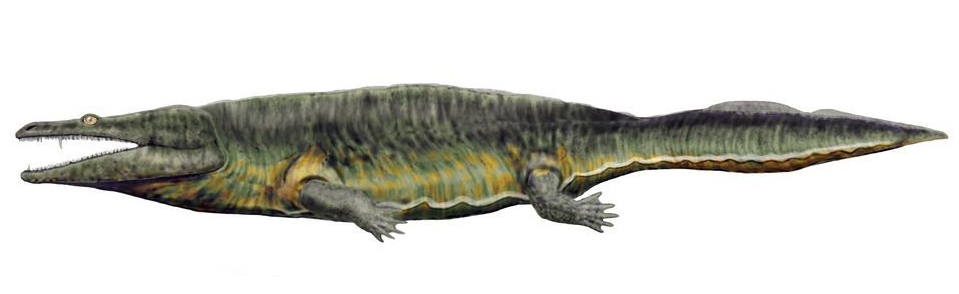
- Restoration of M. krasiejowensis

Scientific classification
- Kingdom: Animalia
- Phylum: Chordata
- Clade: Tetrapoda
- Order: †Temnospondyli
- Suborder: †Stereospondyli
- Family: †Metoposauridae
- Genus: †Metoposaurus; Lydekker, 1890

Species
- †M. diagnosticus (von Meyer, 1842) (type); †M. krasiejowensi Sulej, 2002; †M. algarvensis Brusatte et al 2015; Nomina dubia: †M. fraasi Lucas, 1904; †M. jonesi Case, 1920; †M. santaecrucis Koken, 1913

Synonyms
- Genus-level: Trigonosternum Schmidt, 1931; Species-level: M. heimi Kuhn, 1932; M. stuttgartiensis Fraas, 1913; Trigonosternum latum Schmidt, 1931

= Metoposaurus =

Metoposaurus Temporal range: Norian ~227–216.5 Ma

Extinct genus of temnospondyls

Metoposaurus meaning "front lizard" is an extinct genus of stereospondyl temnospondyls, known from the Late Triassic of Germany, Italy, Poland, and Portugal. This animal was mostly aquatic, possessing small, weak limbs, sharp teeth, and a large, flat head. This highly flattened creature mainly fed on fish, which it captured with its wide jaws lined with needle-like teeth. Many Metoposaurus mass graves have been found, probably from creatures that grouped together in drying pools during drought.

== Discovery and species ==
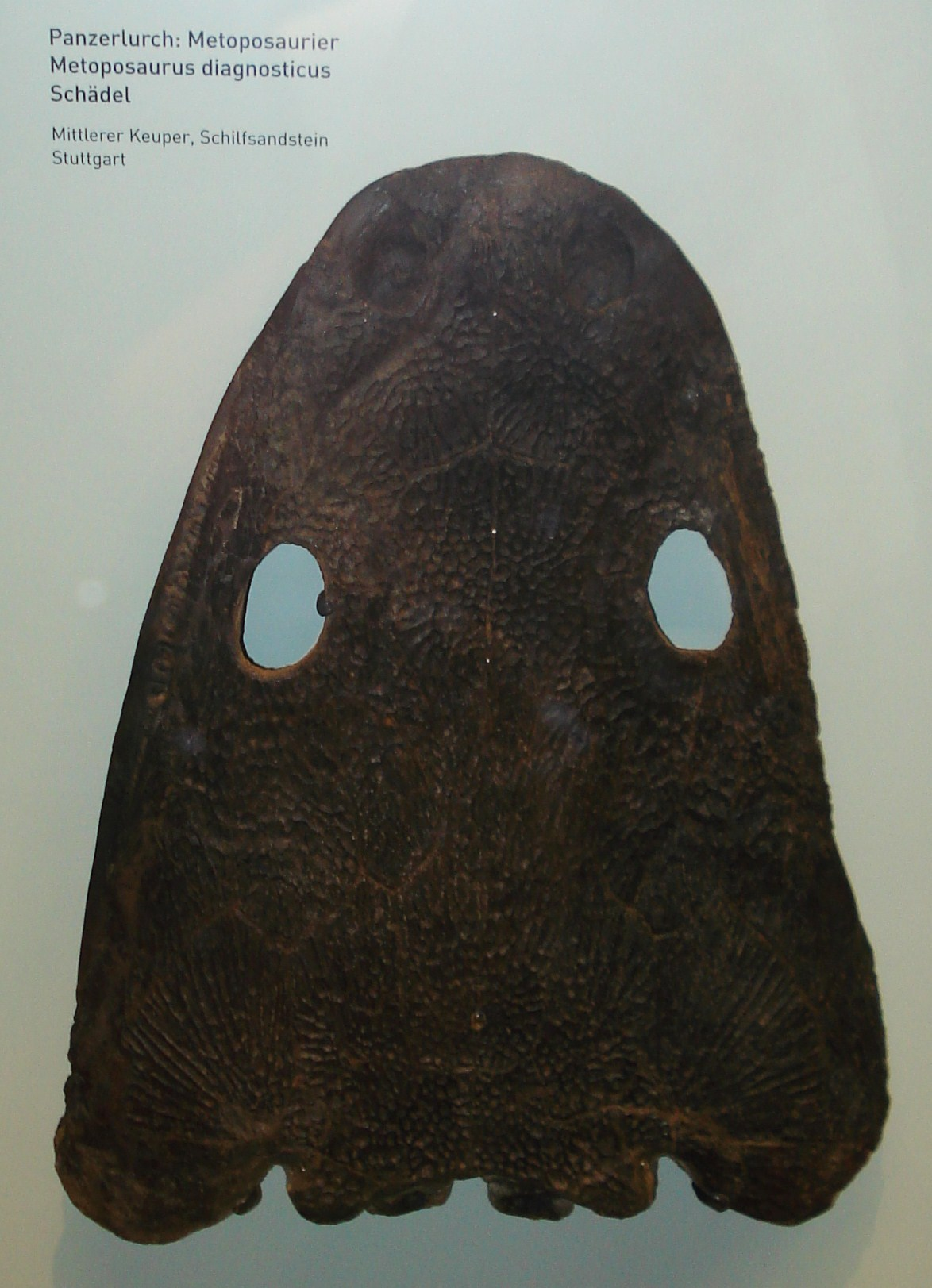
Upper side of M. diagnosticus skull

=== Discovery ===
The earliest mention of Metoposauridae dates back to 1842 when Von Meyer described the dorsal view of the skull roof of a labyrinthodont from the Keuper Schilfsandstein of Feuerbacher Haide near Stuttgart. Later, Meyer attempted a reconstruction of the same specimen and named it Metopias diagnosticus. However, Lydekker later renamed the species as Metoposaurus diagnosticus in 1890 because the name Metopias was already in use.

=== Species ===
Based on the position of the lacrimal in the skull, Metoposauridae is divided into two lineages. The group with the lacrimal external to the orbit includes Koskinonodon bakeri, Dutuitosaurus ouazzoui, Arganasaurus lyazidi, and Apachesaurus gregorii. They show a tendency towards a decreasing depth of the otic notch and a decrease in body size. Metoposaurus diagnosticus, Metoposaurus diagnosticus krasiejowensis and Panthasaurus maleriensis fall in the category of the lacrimal forming the orbital margin.

- Metoposaurus diagnosticus (Meyer, 1842)

Fossils were found among other locations in the Gres à Avicula contorta Formation of France, the Weser Formation of Germany and the Raibl Formation of Italy. The species has an anterior top of the lacrimal closer to the nares than the top of the prefrontal; interclavicle with posterior part longer than in Panthasaurus maleriensis. Metoposaurus diagnosticus diagnosticus lived in the western Germanic Basin, from at least the Schilfsandstein to the Lehrberg Beds sedimentation.

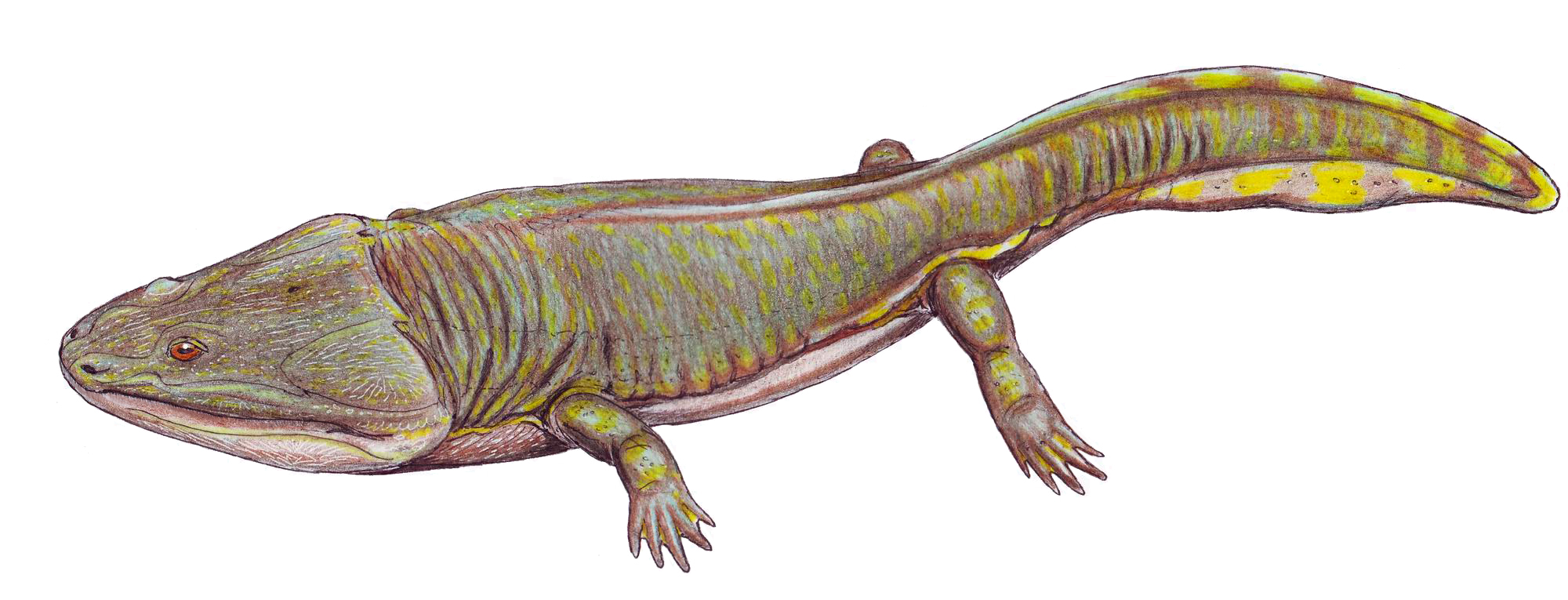
Restoration of M. diagnosticus from Poland

- Metoposaurus krasiejowensis (Sulej, 2002)

Fossils were found in the Drawno Beds Formation of Poland. The species has a very short perineal part of the parietal with the high value of the expansion angle of the sutures separating partially from the supratemporal (mean angle value of 21.81). Some skulls possess a large quadrate foramen and small paraquadrate foramen. It had an estimated skull length up to 47.5 cm (18.7 in).

- Metoposaurus algarvensis (Brusatte et al. 2015)

From the Late Triassic Grès de Silves Formation in the Algarve, Portugal. It has a broader skull than any other Metoposaurus. It was named by Stephen Brusatte, Richard Butler, Octávio Mateus and Sebastien Steyer. It had an estimated mandible length up to 65 cm (26 in).

=== Formerly assigned species ===
- Metoposaurus maleriensis (Chowdhury, 1965)

Described from the Maleri Formation of Central India, was renamed Panthasaurus maleriensis by Chakravorti and Sengupta (2018).

- Metoposaurus azerouali (Dutuit, 1976)

Described from the Argana Group of Morocco. Reassigned to Arganasaurus by Buffa et al. (2019).

==== Synonyms and nomina dubia ====
1. Metoposaurus stuttgartensis: synonymous, is first described by Fraas (1913) from the Keuper Lehbergstufe of Sonnenberg, near Stuttgart. Fraas identified the species based on the interclavicle and left clavicle, vertebrae and rib fragments which are now located in the Stuttgart Museum.
2. Metoposaurus santaecrucis Nomina dubia it was described by Koken (1913) based on the partial skull found in Heiligenkreuz and the specimen is now located in the University Museum of Tübingen.
3. Metoposaurus heimi synonymous it was described by Kuhn (1932) based on a complete skull from the middle Keuper Blasensandstein in Upper Franconia. The specimen is currently located in the Museum of Paleontology and Historical Geology, Munich.

== Description ==
=== Skull ===
==== Lacrimal ====
The lacrimal contacts the nasal medially, the maxilla laterally, the prefrontal posteromedially, and the jugal posteriorly. Metoposaur taxonomy was based on the position of the lacrimal bone, and differing opinions have been published. According to a photograph published by Hunt (1993), it is noted that the lacrimal enters the orbit, contrary to the previous finding by Fraas (1889). According to Lucas, close examination of the skull and other metoposaur skulls does not support this claim, and it has been noted that the misidentification was possibly due to the poor preservation of the fossil. In 2007, Sulej noted that the variability in the position of the lacrimal is narrow enough to be used for phylogenic analysis, but with caution.

==== Parietal ====
A study conducted by Sulej (2007) shows that the parietal contacts the frontal anteriorly, the postfrontal anterolaterally, the supratemporal laterally, and the postparietal posteriorly. The pineal foramen is in the posterior region of the parietal. An interesting feature pointed out by Sulej on examining the skull of Metoposaurus diagnosticus krasiejowensis is that it has a shorter prepineal region of the parietal than Metoposaurus diagnosticus diagnosticus and the expansion angle of the suture separating the parietal from the supratemporal has a lower value.

==== Maxilla ====
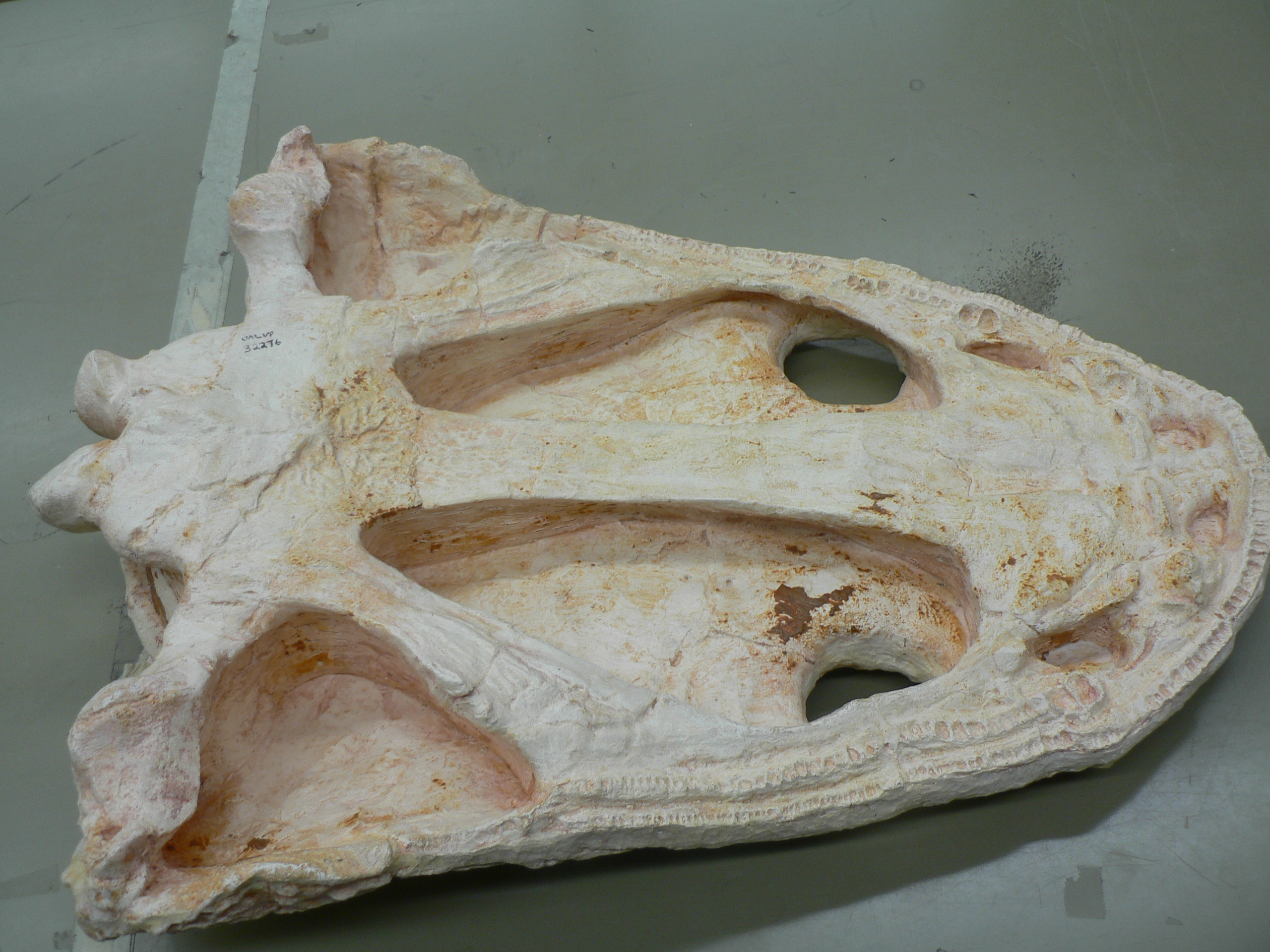
Underside of skull

The maxilla forms a large, completely dentigerous shelf bearing 83 to 107 teeth. The first teeth are large, and tooth size decreases markedly further posteriorly. On the ventral side, the maxilla contacts the ectopterygoid, palatine and vomer. In the choanal region, the maxilla is slightly broadening medially on the palatal side where it borders the choana. The margin of the choana is variable. In most skulls, it is weakly distinguished and rounded, but in a few cases it is more solid and sharply outlined.

=== Vertebral column ===
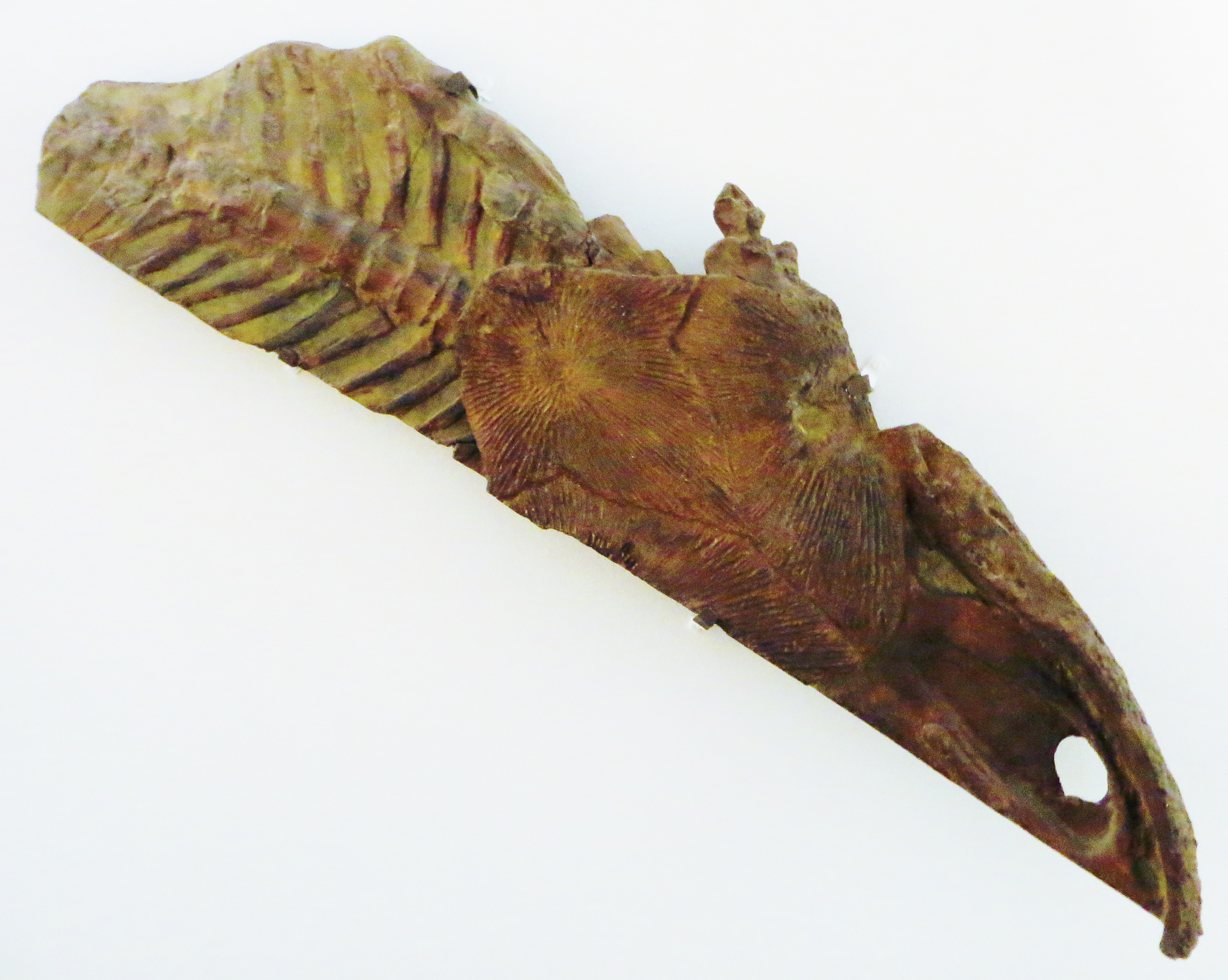
Half of a M. diagnosticus skeleton, showing vertebrae and ribs

According to Sulej (2007), the intercentra of cervical and thoracic vertebra are fully ossified. The pleurocentra are not preserved and no evidence is found that they were present as cartilages. The atlas, axis, and third and fourth cervical vertebrae are characteristic and similar to those in other stereospondyls. The morphology of the atlas, axis, and third and fourth vertebrae suggests that the neck of Metoposaurus was relatively flexible. The intercentra of the region where the vertebral column contacts the shoulder girdle are flat anteriorly and posteriorly. The neural arches have almost vertically set prezygapophyses (vide postcervical vertebrae). This suggests that in this region the lateral bending of the vertebral column was very limited. It was probably connected through articulation of the vertebral column with the shoulder girdle. A stiffening of the vertebral column, in the region of contacting limbs, was apparently essential for swimming. He also describes that in Metoposaurus diagnosticus krasiejowensis, the parapophyses become shorter posteriorly, similarly to plagiosaurids. The intercentra of dorsal and sacral vertebrae are fully ossified and form quite short disks, not connected with the neural arches. In the dorsal and sacral region, they have anterior and posterior surfaces that are concave, or the posterior surface is almost flat. This condition resembles that in the trunk of plesiosaurs and, to some degree, the ichthyosaurs, confirming the aquatic mode of life.

== Geography and history ==
Metoposaurids are known from the early Late Triassic (Carnian) Keuper of Germany and Austria. There have also been unconfirmed notifications reported from Madagascar (Dutuit 1978) and China (Yang 1978). Metoposaurus diagnosticus krasiejoviensis is the most abundant metoposaurid amphibian of the Krasiejów site (the species name comes from the site) located in southern Poland.

Among stereospondyls, metoposaurs seem to have been one of the latest survivors. However, a variety of other temnospondyl lines carried into the Jurassic, the latest of which was another stereospondyl, the chigutisaurid Koolasuchus, discovered in modern-day Australia, where it was supported by a colder mid-Cretaceous climate.

== Paleobiology ==
=== Locomotion ===
Examination of the vertebral column and limb articulations of Metoposaurus suggests that they used their limbs as flippers and swam by making simultaneous and symmetrical limb movements similar to plesiosaurs. A recent study conducted in Poland suggests that the broad, flat head and arm bones, wide hands, and large tail of Metoposaurus diagnosticus are significant characteristics which led the researchers to conclude that they swam in ephemeral lakes during the wet season and used their heads and forearms to burrow under the ground when the dry season began. The study found that the medullary region is filled with well-developed trabecular bone. The growth marks in all bones are organized as thick layers of highly vascularized zones and thick compact annuli with numerous rest lines, which may correspond with favorably wet and long, unfavorably dry seasons.

=== Palaeopathology ===
Multiple palaeopathologies have been described from the species Metoposaurus krasiejowensis, of which individuals documented to have suffered from congenital scoliosis caused by hemivertebra are known, as are individuals displaying evidence of spinal arthropathy, both the oldest case and the first occurrence in a non-amniote.

In 2022 a specimen of Metoposaurus krasiejowensis was also recorded as having osteosarcoma, reported as the first record of a Mesozoic non-amniote with undoubted evidence of a primary malignant bone tumour.

=== Predators ===
The exact predators of Metoposaurus are unknown, but phytosaurs were found closely associated in bone beds.
