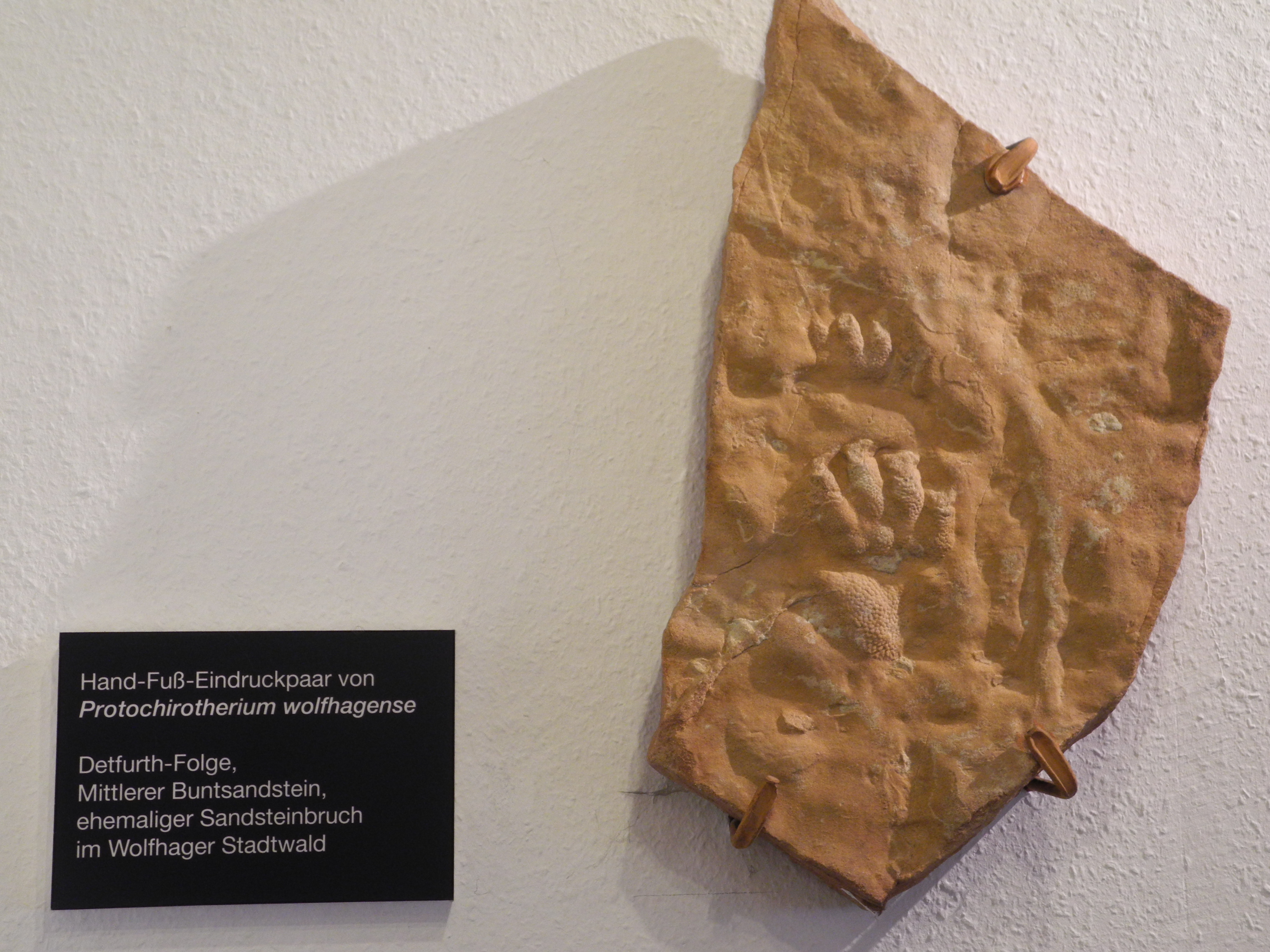
- Holotype trace fossil of P. wolfhagenense, displayed in Regionalmuseum Wolfhagen

Trace fossil classification
- Kingdom: Animalia
- Phylum: Chordata
- Class: Reptilia
- Clade: Archosauria
- Clade: Pseudosuchia
- Ichnofamily: †Chirotheriidae
- Ichnogenus: †Protochirotherium; Fichter and Kunz, 2004

Icnhospecies
- †P. wolfhagense Fichter and Kunz, 2004; †P. hauboldi (Ptaszynski et al., 1990)

Synonyms
- Brachychirotherium hauboldi Ptaszynski et al., 1990

= Protochirotherium =

Protochirotherium Temporal range: Early Triassic, Olenekian–Anisian Possible Late Permian record

Reptile footprint trace fossil

Protochirotherium, also known as Protocheirotherium ('first hand-beast'), is a Late Permian?-Early Triassic ichnotaxon (trace fossil) consisting of five-fingered (pentadactyl) footprints and whole tracks, discovered in Germany and later Morocco, Poland and possibly also Italy. The type ichnospecies is P. wolfhagense, discovered by R. Kunz in 1999 alongside Chirotherium tracks, was named and described in 2004 and re-evaluated in 2007; a second ichnospecies, P. hauboldi, also exists, which was initially described as an ichnospecies of Brachychirotherium. Protochirotherium-like prints have also been documented from the Late Permian of Italy, possibly representing the oldest known fossils of mesaxonic archosauromorphs.

Protochirotherium is the earliest known chirotheriid ichnotaxon, similar to later forms such as Chirotherium, Isochirotherium, and Brachychirotherium. The shape of the large pes (foot) and smaller manus (hand) are typical among chirotheres, with a plantigrade posture and five clawed toes. The fifth (outermost) digit of the pes shortened and curved away from the other four. Both the pes and manus are mesaxonic, with the longest digit being digit III (the middle digit) Digit IV is only slightly shorter than digit III, and digit II slightly shorter than digit IV. In the pes, the base of digit V has the form of a massive, rounded pad, which is more strongly expanded than in other chirotheres.

Compared to other chirotheres, the animal creating the trackways was small to medium-sized, with a relatively wide gait (though still very narrow compared to most reptiles) and short stride length. The pace angulation is low, the pes and manus slightly point outwards, and the manus print is positioned close to the pes print. Trackmakers are certainly archosauriforms with an erect posture. Erythrosuchids have been suggested as responsible for some European tracks, though they may have had a broader gait. Early pseudosuchian archosaurs are a more widely accepted candidate.

== Fossil distribution ==
Fossils of Protochirotherium have been found in:

Triassic

- Detfurth Formation (Buntsandstein), Olenekian, Germany (Protochirotherium wolfhagenense)
- Argana Basin, Morocco (Protochirotherium sp.)
- Wióry Formation, Poland (Protochirotherium hauboldi)

=== Permian ===
- Val Gardena Sandstone, Late Permian, Italy (cf. Protochirotherium)

== Gallery ==
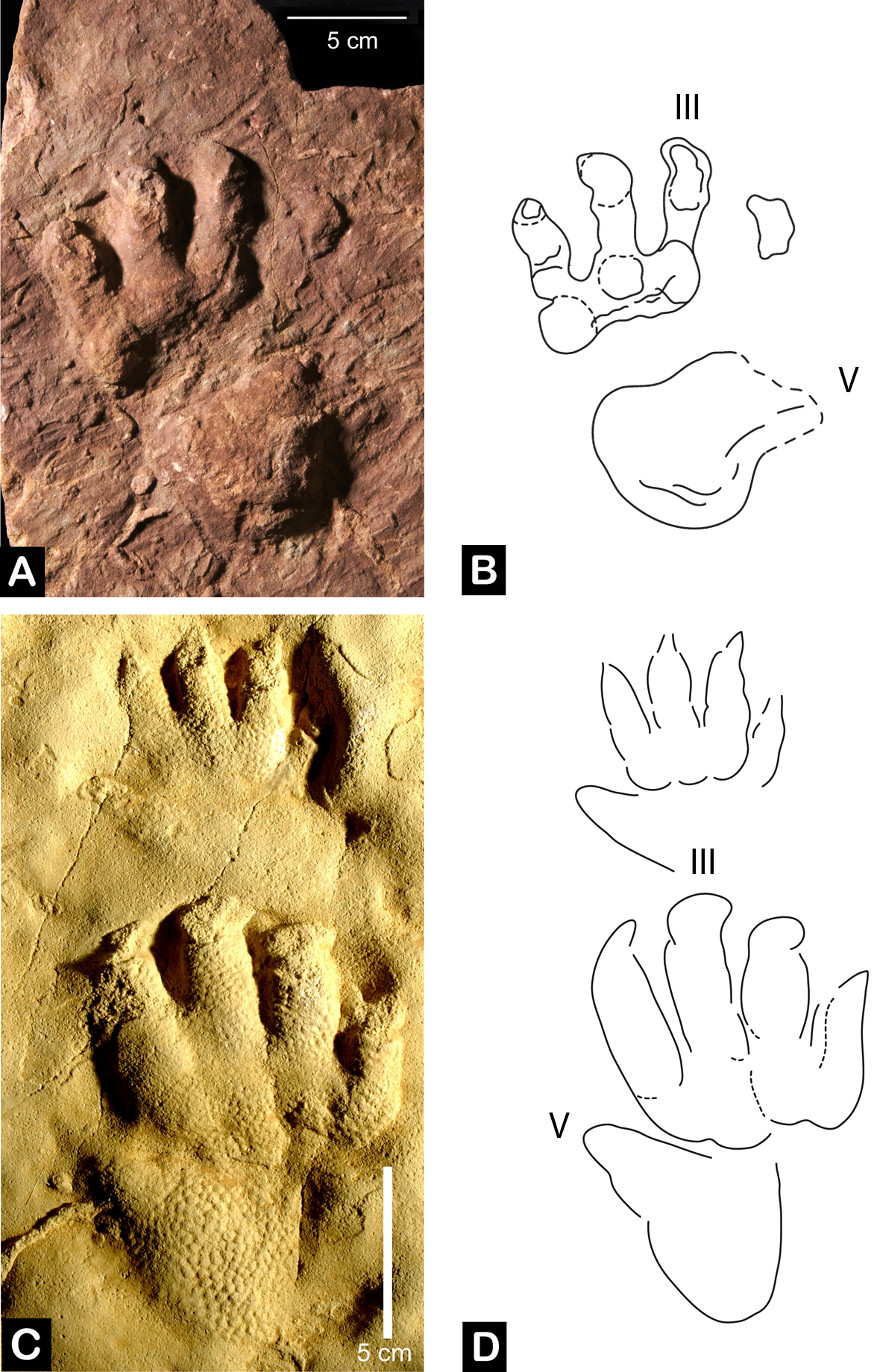
cf. Protochirotherium from the Val Gardena Sandstone of Italy (top) and the holotype of P. wolfhagenense from the Detfurth Formation, Germany (bottom)
