= Krasiejów =

- Village
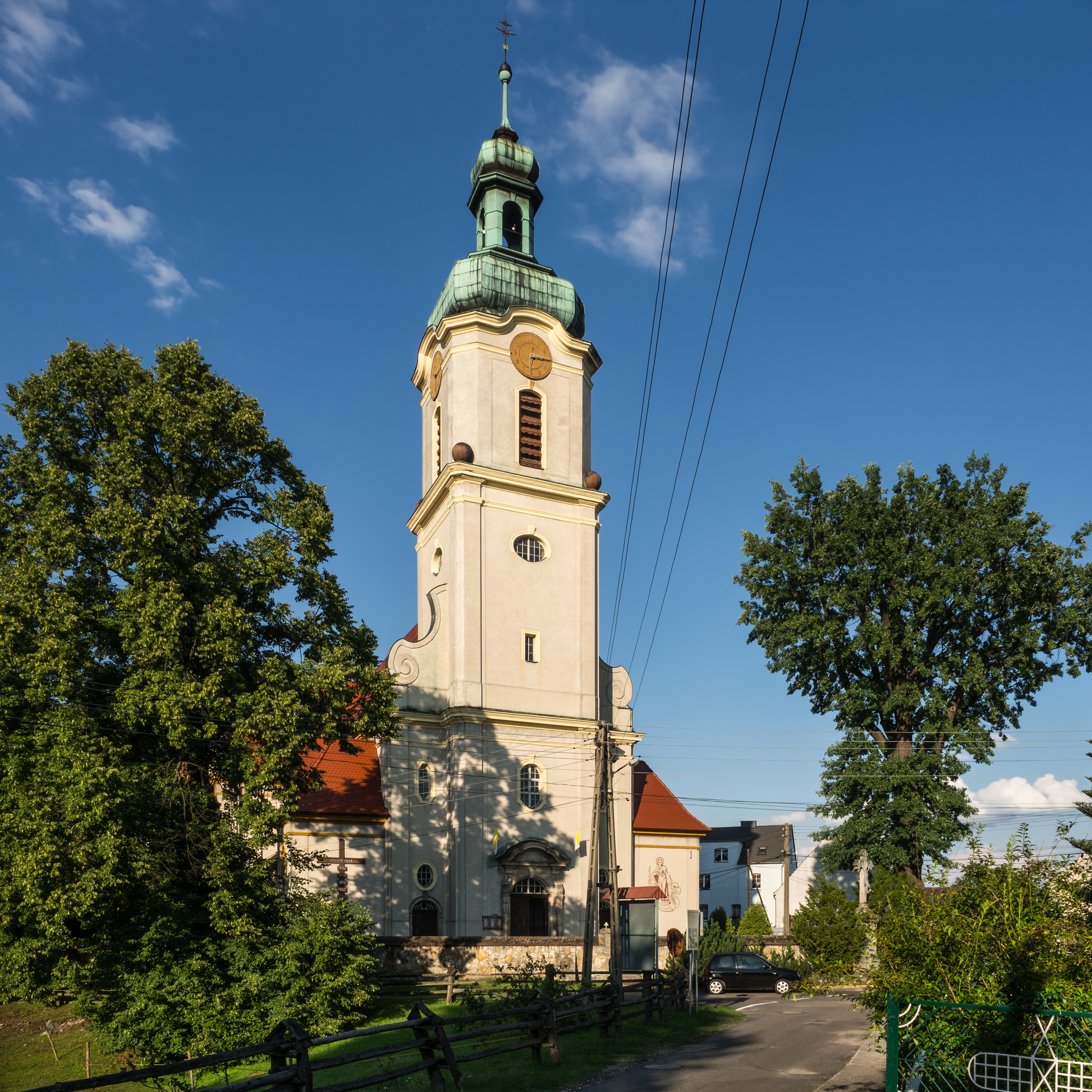
- Church of Saint Margaret

- Location within Poland
- Coordinates: 50°40′5″N 18°14′48″E
- Country: Poland
- Voivodeship: Opole
- County: Opole
- Gmina: Ozimek
- First mentioned: 13th century
- Population: 2,050
- Time zone: UTC+1 (CET)
  - Summer (DST): UTC+2 (CEST)
- Vehicle registration: OPO
- Website: http://www.krasiejow.pl

Krasiejów [kraˈɕɛjuf] (German: Krascheow) is a village in the administrative district of Gmina Ozimek, within Opole County, Opole Voivodeship, in south-western Poland.

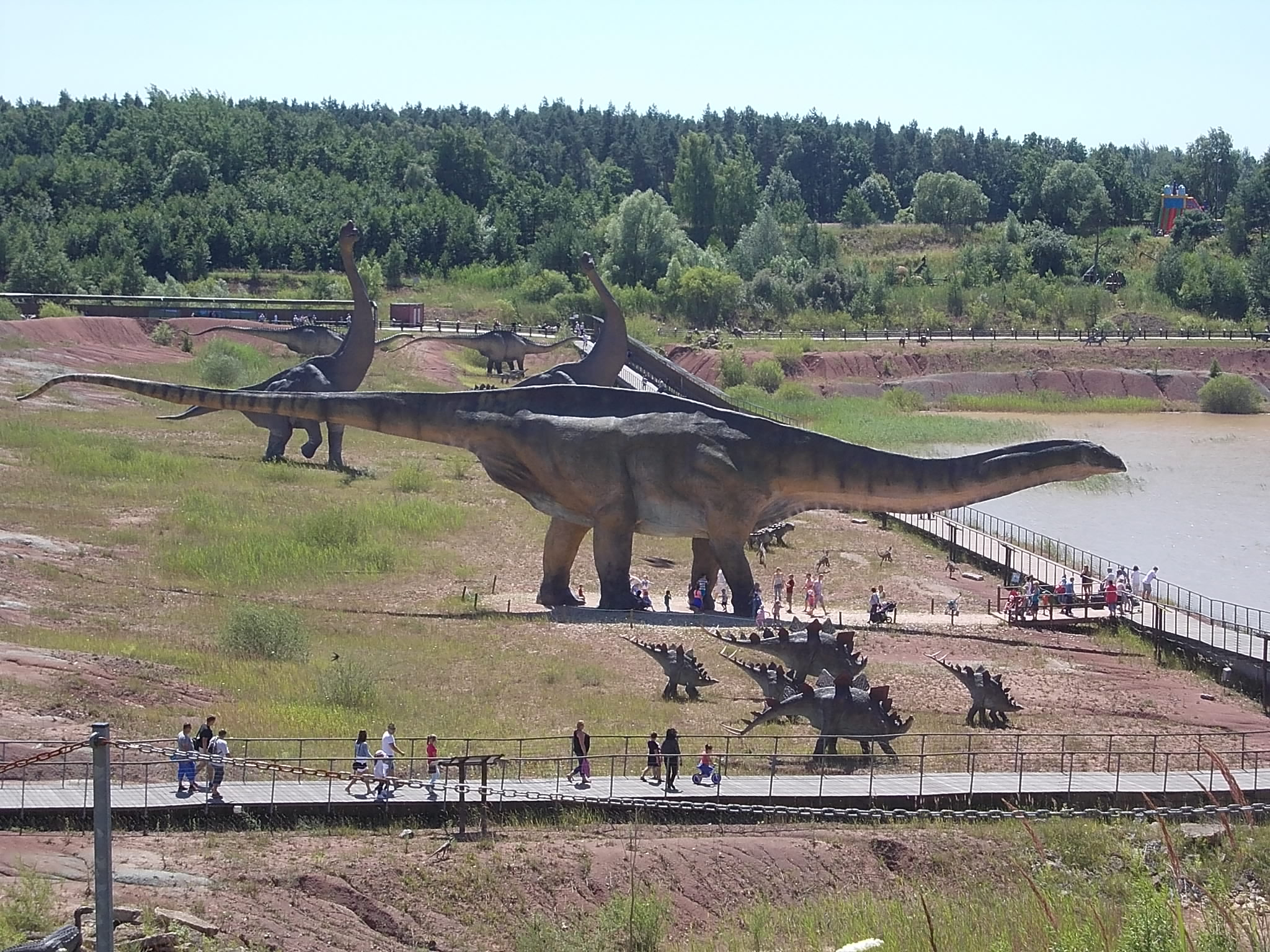
JuraPark Krasiejów with life-size dinosaur models.

== Paleontological localities ==
Abundant skeletons of the Upper Triassic tetrapods (i.e., large Temnospondyli: Metoposaurus and Cyclotosaurus; reptiles: Paleorhinus, dinosauriformes (Silesaurus) were described from the pit. Two paleontological museums and large dinopark (so-called JuraPark) are at Krasiejów. Some microvertebrate fossils, fossil plants, bivalves, crustaceans and fish scales were also collected at the site.

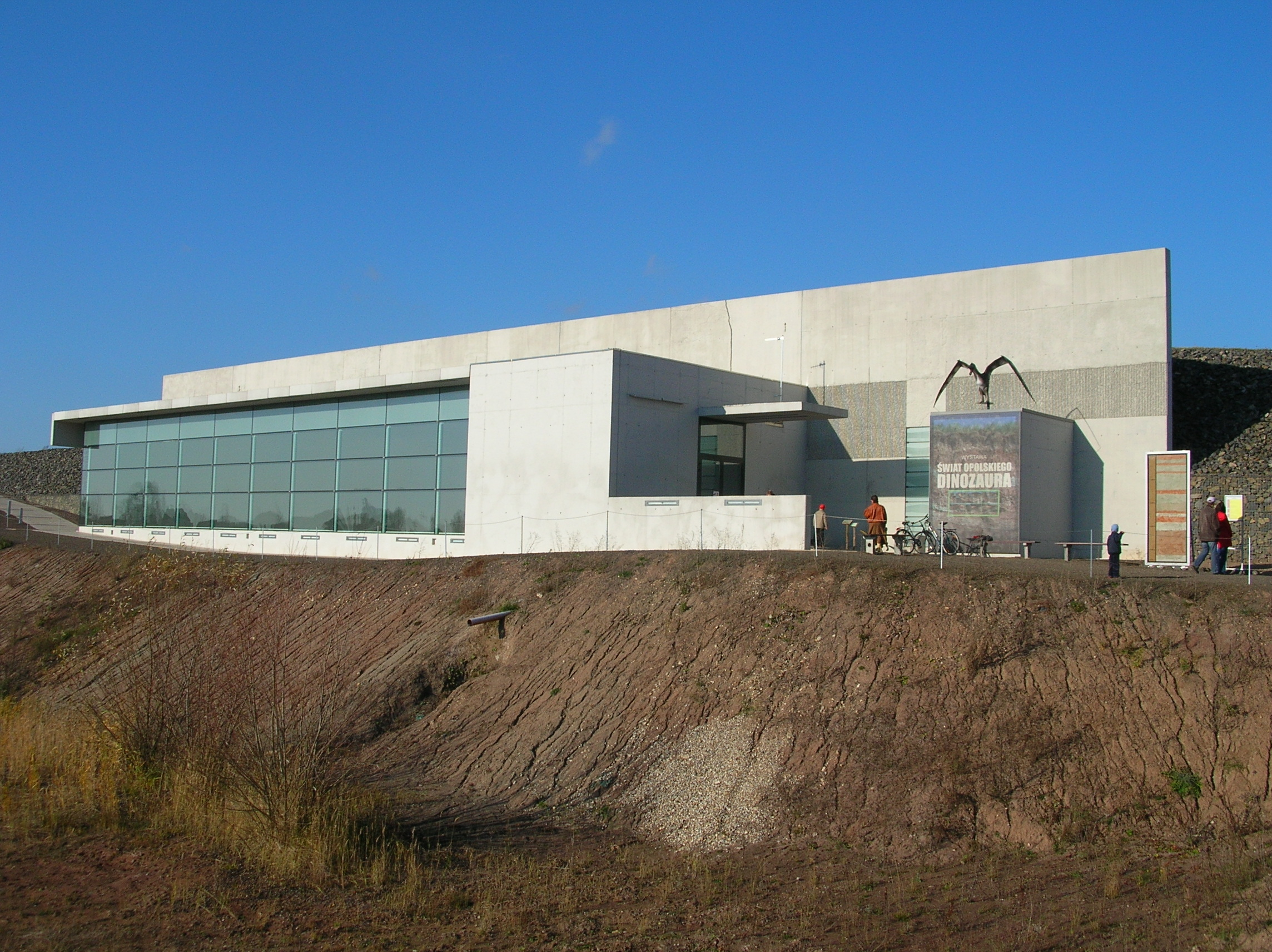
Museum of Triassic tetrapods at Krasiejów.

== History ==
The village was first mentioned in the 13th century, when it was part of Piast-ruled Poland. Its name is of Polish origin, and comes from the Old Polish words kraszenie or krasny. Later on, the village was also part of Bohemia (Czechia), Prussia and Germany. After the restoration of independent Poland after World War I in 1918, the Silesian Uprisings were fought in the area, with the aim of reintegrating the region with Poland, however, the village was assigned to Germany. There is a mass grave of Polish insurgents in the village. In 1936, the Germans changed the name to Schönhorst to erase traces of Polish origin. During World War II the Germans operated the E799 forced labour subcamp of the Stalag VIII-B/344 prisoner-of-war camp in the village. After Germany's defeat in the war, in 1945, the village became again part of Poland, and its historic name was restored.
