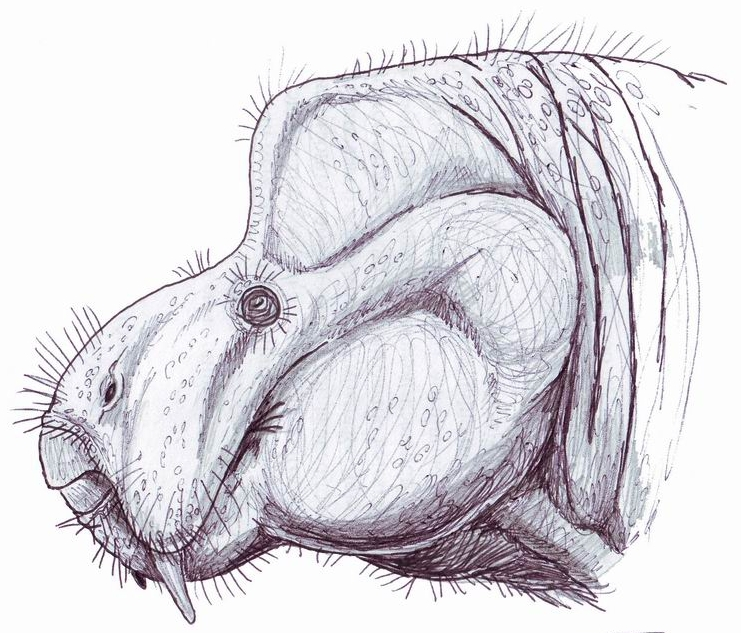

Scientific classification
- Kingdom: Animalia
- Phylum: Chordata
- Clade: Synapsida
- Clade: Therapsida
- Clade: †Anomodontia
- Clade: †Dicynodontia
- Family: †Stahleckeriidae
- Subfamily: †Placeriinae
- Genus: †Moghreberia; Dutuit 1980

Type species
- Moghreberia nmachouensis Dutuit 1980

Synonyms
- Azarifeneria Dutuit 1989

= Moghreberia =

Moghreberia Temporal range: Carnian ~235–222 Ma

Extinct genus of dicynodonts

Moghreberia is an extinct genus of dicynodont predicted to have lived only in the mid-Triassic, primarily during the early middle Carnian and found only in the Argana Basin of Morocco. Moghreberia belonged to the Stahleckeriidae family, a group of anomodont therapsids and is most commonly known by its species Moghreberia nmachouensis. Its name is derived from the Arabic phrase al-Maghrib al-Aqsa meaning "the far west", a term used by Arabic scholars to refer to the approximate region of Morocco, the area in which this animal's fossil was first discovered. The extinction of many dicynodonts has been attributed to pressures of the Carnian Pluvial Episode, which occurred around 234-232 Ma and generated major ecological and climate changes for years to come.

== Geological and paleoenvironmental information ==
The first remains of Moghreberia included two poorly preserved skulls discovered in the Irohalene Member, a section of the Timezgadiouine Formation in the Argana Basin of modern-day Morocco. The Irohalene Member is characterized by abundant vertebrate fauna remains and footprints including members of Dinosauromorpha, crocodilian-stem archosaurs, phytosaurs, lepidosauromorphs and archosauromorphs as well as actinopterygians and dipnoi. The Argana Basin is in the western part of the High Atlas of Morocco and consists of three distinct formations known as the Timezgadiouine, Ikakern and the Bigoudine formations. Like Moghreberia nmachouensis, most dicynodont remains in this region were found in the Timezgadiouine formation. Geology of this formation suggests a dry and humid climate with shallow, still-bodied water.

== Historical information and discovery ==
After discovery of the initial two skulls in the Argana Basin, these remains were first detailed, and the genus and species named, by JM Dutuit in 1980, in which he emphasized similarities to other kannemeyerids. Dutuit further detailed the genus using more well-preserved partial cranial remains discovered in the Argana Basin as well in 1988. It was using this new fossil that he initially categorized Moghreberia into Kannemeyeridae. Dutuit did, however, recognize similarities between Moghreberia and the North American genus Placerias within the family Stahleckeriidae. This observation was later supported by computer-assisted phylogenetic analysis by Kammerer et al. which concluded Moghreberia was most closely related to Placerias, placing it in Stahleckeriidae as opposed to Kannemeyeridae. This established Moghreberia as a close relative to Stahleckeria, Ischigualastia, and Angonisaurus in addition to Placerias. Based on these few isolated cranial elements and the complete lack of postcranial remains, the taxonomic validity of Moghreberia was highly debated. Some authors claimed it was a sister taxon of Placerias, as previously mentioned, whereas others claimed it was merely a synonym of Placerias and that they were one and the same. It wasn't until 2020 that its taxonomic validity was reanalyzed and the gap in phylogenetic positioning closed with the first postcranial analysis of Moghreberia nmachouensis, which was made possible due to the discovery of a nearly complete skeleton of the individual. This analysis concluded that Moghreberia was in fact phylogenetically unique and is likely more closely related to Lisowicia of Poland than to North American Placerias.

== Description ==
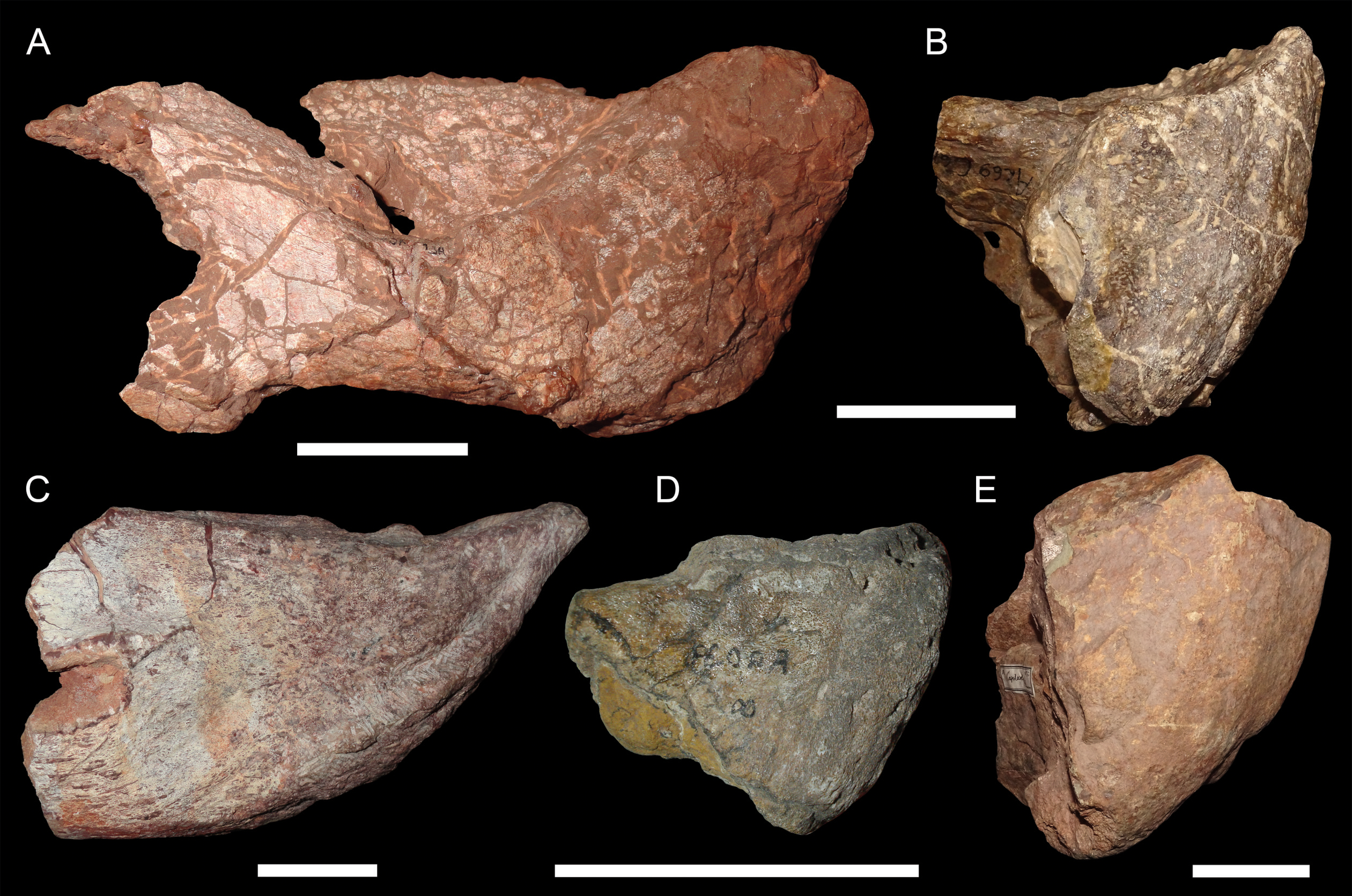
Stahleckeriid mandibles

Various examinations and analyses of both cranial and postcranial elements have outlined the characteristics displayed in Moghreberia fossils.

=== Cranial elements ===
==== Skull ====
In the initial primary analysis of Moghreberia skulls, Dutuit listed multiple unique features of Moghreberia cranial elements helping to distinguish it from other dicynodonts. This genus was characterized by a low, dorsoventrally, and laterally expanded occipital surface as well as primarily horizontal lateral mandibular branches. Dutuit also noted a highly pointed tip of the snout and a dorsal margin of the erupted portion of the canine tusk anterior to the nasal cavity. The skull overall was relatively large and narrow for a dicynodont, measuring over 40 cm. Small lateral expansion of the squamosals is evident. This genus can also be characterized by a highly angled intertemporal bar, elongate posterior parietal processes, and a deeply depressed preparietal. Two cranial elements helping to distinguish Moghreberia from Placerias include a lack of caniniform depression and elongate postnarial excavation.

Being of the Stahleckeriidae family, Moghreberia exhibits a blunt snout as opposed to the rounded snouts of Kennemeyeriidae. The former shape, the one seen in Moghreberia, was more common among dicynodonts than the latter.

==== Dentition ====
Despite the fact that the family, Stahleckeriidae, is defined as tuskless, Moghreberia, like its close relative Placerias, did in fact have large tusks protruding anterior to the naval cavity on the skull. In fact, Moghreberia had a complete absence of teeth besides these paired maxillary tusks. Dicynodont tusks have been hypothesized to be for display purposes, but this is unconfirmed. Being a Triassic dicynodont implies that these were likely ever-growing and composed of thick dentine walls, an enamel cap and roots growing deep into the maxilla. Larger individuals, like Moghreberia, exhibit narrowing of the pulp cavity as well.

=== Postcranial elements ===
With the discovery of a nearly complete skeleton of Moghreberia, postcranial elements could finally be observed and were officially detailed in 2020 by Chloe Olivier. Moghreberia was overall a large dicynodont.

==== Vertebrae ====
The vertebrae of Moghreberia were determined to be amphicoelous being both antiorly and posteriorly concave. Due to decreased obtuse angles between the zygopophyses of the dorsal vertebrae, this genus would be less flexible in lateral movement. It has also been confirmed that Moghreberia has five sacral vertebrae accompanied by five sacral ribs. Due to the large size difference between the first and fifth caudal vertebrae, it is predicted that caudal vertebrae size rapidly decreases towards the posterior.

==== Scapulacoracoid and sternum ====
The scapula of the specimen is elongate with enlarged dorsal and even more enlarged ventral regions. The precoracoid and coracoid are anteriorly fused with the scapula. A coracoid foramen is clearly noticeable. The interclavicle is characterized by a triangular anterior region and a longer posterior region. The sternum exhibits sternal bosses presenting an anterodorsal rounded surface. Moghreberia, being a member of Placeriinae, displayed a distinct posterior projection on the posterior surface of the scapula.

==== Pelvis ====
An isolated, unfused ilium, ischium and pubis indicate a very flexible pelvis in Moghreberia. The articular process of the ischia is described as stout and ventrally constricted. The pubic tubercle is made of a thick process extending from the pubis anteroventrally.

== Paleobiology ==
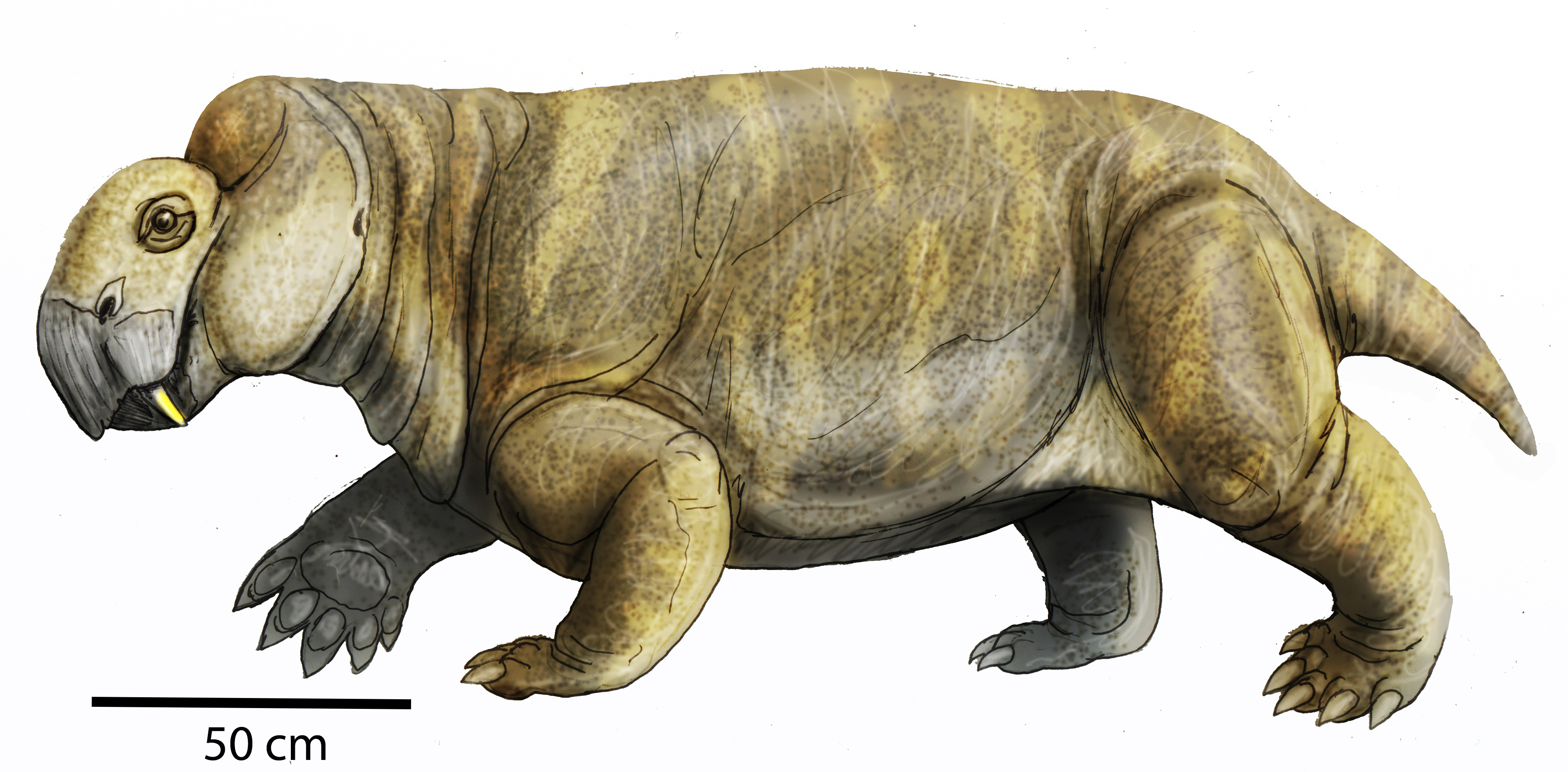
Life restoration

Members of Stahlekeriidae, like all dicynodonts, were herbivorous. It is postulated that Stahlekeriidae were also browsers, as opposed to grazers, feeding at head height. The characteristic broad snout of Moghreberia and other Stahlekeriidae implies a lack of precision and selectivity in feeding that was possible with the narrow snouts of Kannemeyeridae. The tusks of Moghreberia are thought to serve display purposes rather than any feeding purposes.

It has also been hypothesized that Moghreberia was endothermic, making it one of the earliest endotherms discovered. Studies by Rey et al. focused on oxygen isotopes and fibrolamellar bone to make this determination. Oxygen occurs in two isotopes in the tissue and is temperature dependent. Oxygen isotope 18 occurs in greater amounts in greater body temperatures. Moghreberia was found to have high relative levels of this isotope, implying increased body temperature and increased metabolic activity. Additionally, fibrolamellar bone can be used as evidence of sustained fast growth. Moghreberia was found to possess fibrolamellar bone, further suggesting a relatively high metabolic rate able to support endothermy. Olivier conducted a similar analysis of fibrolamellar bone in the femur and humerus and again found relatively high levels which were used to further compute relatively high metabolic rates.

== Sources ==
- Olivier, Chloé (2020). Phylogeny, paleobiogeography, and paleophysiology of the Triassic dicynodonts (Therapsida, Anomodontia): contributions of the Laotian and Moroccan forms (Thesis).
