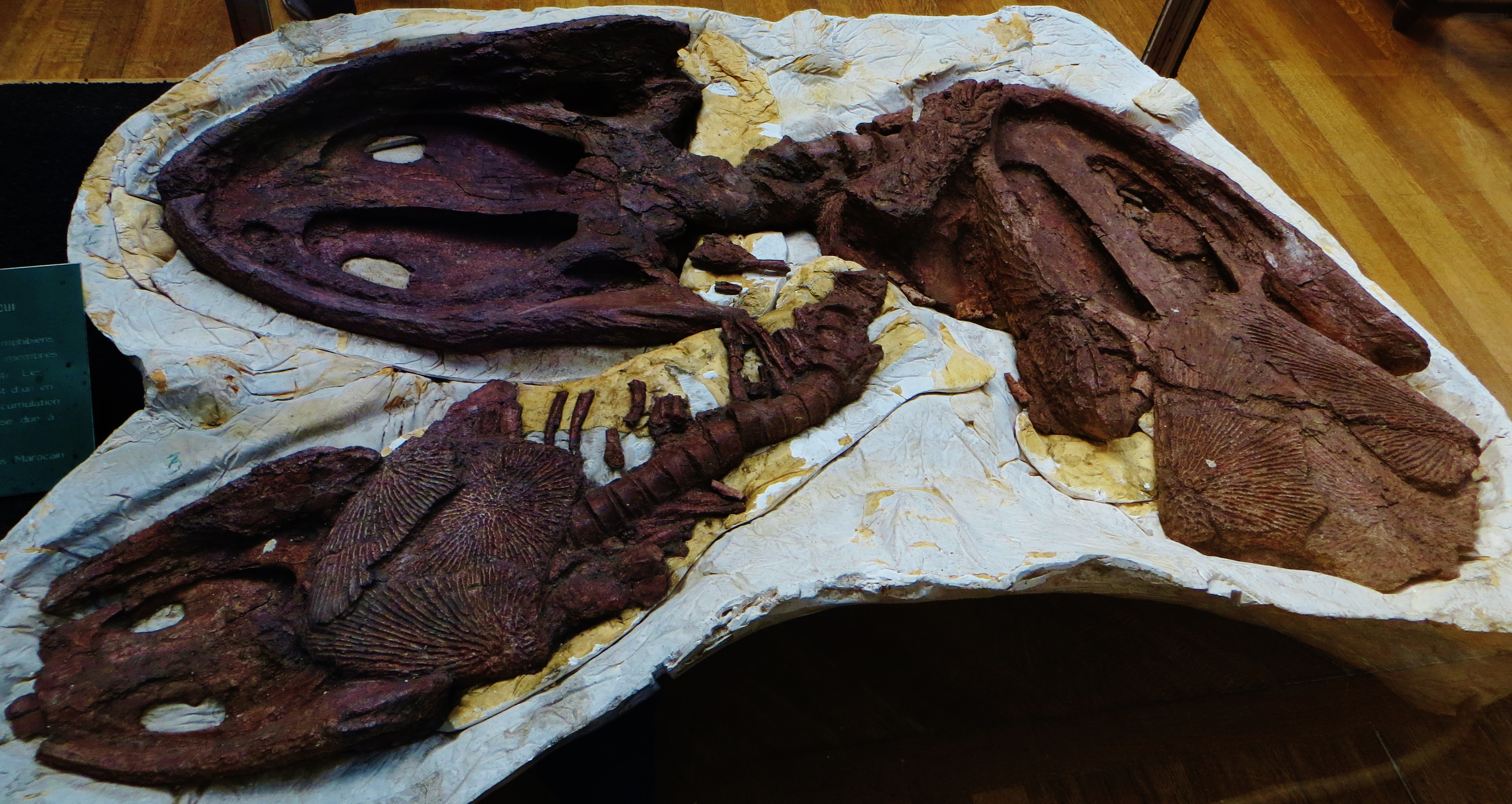
- Lower side of two D. ouazzoui.
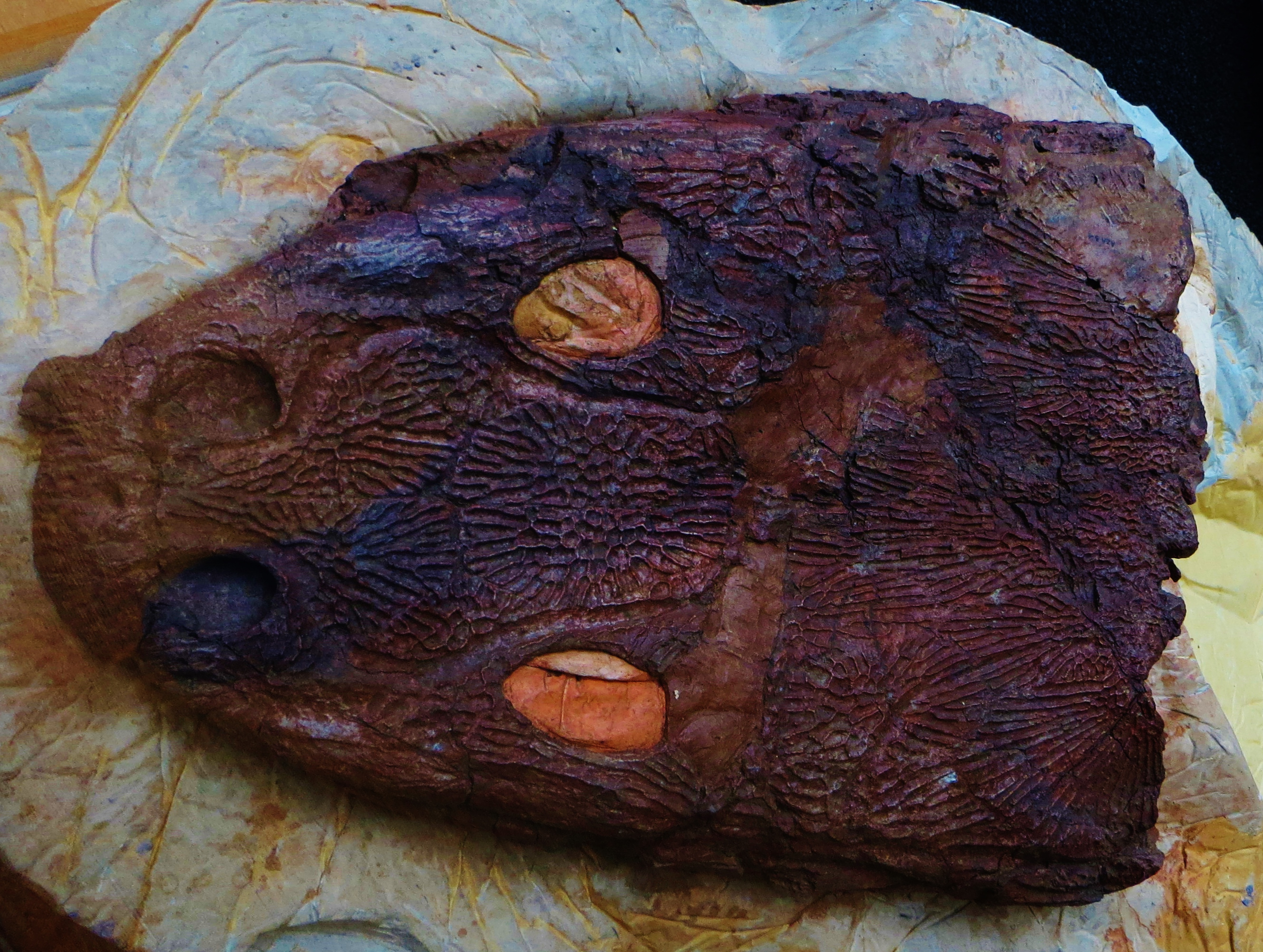
- Skull of D. ouazzoui

Scientific classification
- Kingdom: Animalia
- Phylum: Chordata
- Clade: Tetrapoda
- Order: †Temnospondyli
- Suborder: †Stereospondyli
- Family: †Metoposauridae
- Genus: †Dutuitosaurus; Hunt, 1993

Type species
- †Dutuitosaurus ouazzoui Dutuit, 1976

Synonyms
- Metoposaurus ouazzoui Dutuit, 1976

= Dutuitosaurus =

Dutuitosaurus Temporal range: Late Triassic, 235.0–221.5 Ma

Extinct genus of temnospondyls

Dutuitosaurus is a genus of metoposaurids, a group of temnospondyls that lived during the Late Triassic period. Dutuitosaurus was discovered in the early 1960s in Morocco and is known from the lower t5 units of the Timezgadiouine Formation exposures in the Argana Basin of the High Atlas Mountains and was first described in 1976 by French paleontologist Jean-Michel Dutuit. Material of Dutuitosaurus is currently held in the Muséum national d'histoire naturelle (MNHN) in Paris, France. It was originally placed within Metoposaurus as M. ouazzoui but was subsequently placed in its own genus, Dutuitosaurus, by Hunt (1993), who identified a number of differences between Metoposaurus (classically a European genus) and the Moroccan metoposaurids. Features that differentiate Dutuitosaurus from other metoposaurids include relative elongate intercentra and a maxilla that enters the orbit.

Although many metoposaurids are known from so-called mass death assemblages that preserve large skeletal accumulations, the deposits in which Dutuitosaurus was found are relatively unique in preserving several completely articulated skeletons (over 70 individuals are present). This is interpreted to represent a relatively in situ preservation, possibly by the drying up of a pond as was classically proposed by Romer (1939), rather than transport of large amounts of remains into another area that would have become progressively disarticulated, as is probably the case with other metoposaurid mass death assemblages. Because most other metoposaurids are only known from a collection of dissociated skeletal elements, Dutuitosaurus is frequently taken as the guide for inferring skeletal proportions and precise positions of different elements in metoposaurids.
