= Hartmut Haubold =

German paleontologist (born 1941)

- Born: 12 January 1941 (age 85); Halle (Saale), Germany
- Education: Martin Luther University of Halle-Wittenberg
- Known for: Research on fossil reptiles, dinosaur tracks, description of Emausaurus
- Scientific career
- Fields: Paleontology
- Workplaces: Martin Luther University of Halle-Wittenberg

Hartmut Haubold (born 12 January 1941) is a German paleontologist.

== Career ==
Haubold participated in excavations at the famous Geiseltal fossil site near his hometown as early as 1959–60. From 1960 to 1965 he studied geology and paleontology in Halle, completing a diploma thesis on a trackway fauna from the Buntsandstein of southern Thuringia. He then became an assistant at the Geological-Paleontological Institute of the Martin Luther University of Halle-Wittenberg. In 1968 he received his doctorate with a dissertation on the tetrapod tracks of the Germanic Buntsandstein. He habilitated in 1978 with a thesis on the biostratigraphy and fossil facies of the Permosiles in the Thuringian Forest. In 1978 he was appointed senior assistant, in 1990 lecturer in paleontology, and in 1992 professor at Halle. He became emeritus in 2006.

Haubold focused particularly on fossil reptiles, especially dinosaurs and their tracks. In his diploma work he studied early Rotodactylus tracks from the Buntsandstein of Thuringia, originally attributed to pseudosuchians but now regarded as similar to early dinosauriforms such as the South American Lagosuchus. In 1990 he described the thyreophoran dinosaur Emausaurus ernsti from the Lower Jurassic near Greifswald. Haubold also authored two widely used German-language standard works on dinosaurs and dinosaur tracks.

== Selected publications ==
- Saurierfährten. Ziemsen, Wittenberg, 1984.
- Die Dinosaurier. Ziemsen, Wittenberg, 1989 (Neue Brehm Bücherei).
- Eine Pseudosuchier-Fährtenfauna aus dem Buntsandstein Südthüringens. Hallesches Jahrbuch für mitteldeutsche Erdgeschichte 8 (1966): 12–48.
- Die Tetrapodenfährten des Buntsandstein und ihre Äquivalente in der gesamten Trias. Paläontologische Abhandlungen, Abt. A, Paläozoologie, 4 (1971): 395–548.
- Stratigraphische Grundlagen des Stefan C und Rotliegenden im Thüringer Wald. Schriftenreihe geologische Wissenschaften, Berlin 23 (1985).
- with Rudolf Daber: Lexikon der Fossilien, Minerale und geologischen Begriffe. Edition Leipzig, 1988.
- with Ludwig Rüffle and Günter Krumbiegel: Das eozäne Geiseltal: ein mitteleuropäisches Braunkohlenvorkommen und seine Pflanzen- und Tierwelt. Wittenberg: Ziemsen, 1983. (Die Neue Brehm-Bücherei, vol. 237).
- with Oskar Kuhn: Lebensbilder und Evolution fossiler Saurier, Amphibien und Reptilien. Wittenberg: Ziemsen, 1961; 2nd ed. 1981.
- with Günther Schaumberg: Die Fossilien des Kupferschiefer. (Die Neue Brehm-Bücherei). 1985; 2nd ed. 2006.
- Das Geiseltal. Lebensbilder aus der Braunkohlenzeit. In Werner K. Weidert (ed.), Klassische Fundstellen der Paläontologie, vol. 3. Goldschneck Verlag, 1995.
