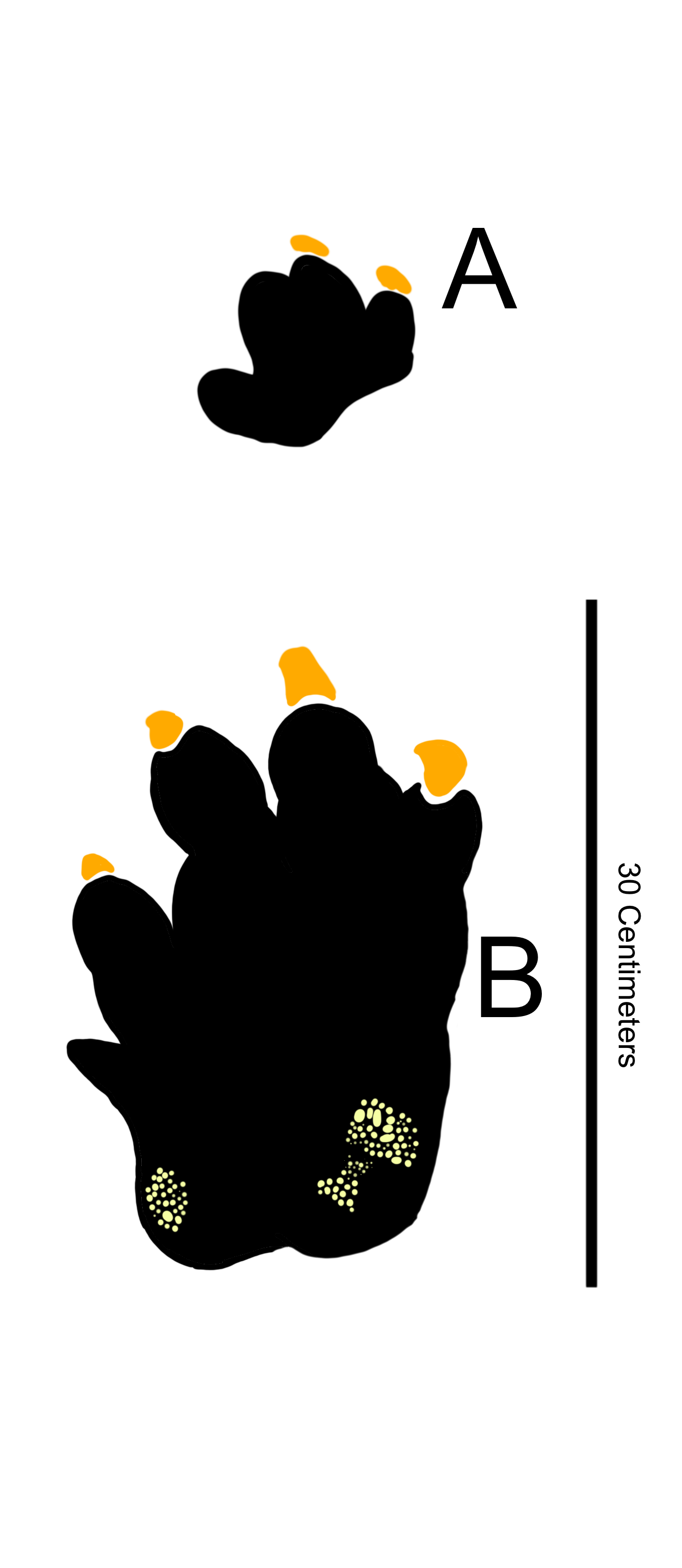
- Footprints of Isochirotherium herculis with scale

Trace fossil classification
- Kingdom: Animalia
- Phylum: Chordata
- Class: Reptilia
- Clade: Pseudosuchia
- Ichnofamily: †Chirotheriidae
- Ichnogenus: †isochirotherium Haubold, 1971

Type ichnospecies
- †Isochirotherium herculis Egerton, 1838

Ichnospecies
- †Isochirotherium bipedale Abel, 1935; †Isochirotherium circademathieui Gand, 1979; †Isochirotherium coltoni Peabody, 1948; †Isohirotherium comblei Gand, 1979; †Isochirotherium coureli Demathieu, 1970; †Isochirotherium delicatum Courel and Demathieu, 1976; †Isochirotherium demathieui Haubold, 1970; †Isochirotherium felenci Courel and Demathieu, 1976; †Isochirotherium gardettensis Petti et al., 2020; †Isochirotherium gierlinskii (Ptaszynski, 2020); †Isochirotherium herculis Egerton, 1838; †Isochirotherium hessbergense Haubold, 1970; †Isochirotherium jenense Haubold, 1970; †Isochirotherium lomasi Baird, 1954; †Isochirotherium marshalli Peabody, 1948; †Isochirotherium sanctacrucense Pstaszynski, 1990; †Isochirotherium soergeli Haubold, 1969

= Isochirotherium =

Isochirotherium Temporal range: 243.5–237 Ma

Ichnogenus of Triassic archosaurs

Isochirotherium is an ichnogenus of archosaur. The type species is Isochirotherium herculis known from the Middle Triassic of Germany, but the ichnogenus spans from the Anisian to the Carnian ages of the Triassic. It was a large animal, approximately 5-6 meters (18ft) long, that walked quadrupedally. It is thought to be a ctenosauriscid, related to, or possibly being, Arizonasaurus. Trackways now known to belong to Isochirotherium were initially thought to be Sauropodomorph footprints, due to their large size compared to other similar tracks. Subsequently, Aetosaurs were considered as a possible identity for isochirotherium, but dismissed as the earliest trackways from the taxa are far older than the oldest skeletal remains of aetosaurs and inconsistent with their foot and hand morphology. I. herculis is thought to be a Ctenosauriscid primarily because of the small forelimbs and plantigrade feet present in its trackways, known to be the ancestral condition of archosauria and therefore likely consistent with ctenosauriscid morpholoy. The trackmaker of Isochirotherium herculis was potentially the largest terrestrial animal of the Middle Triassic.

== Description ==
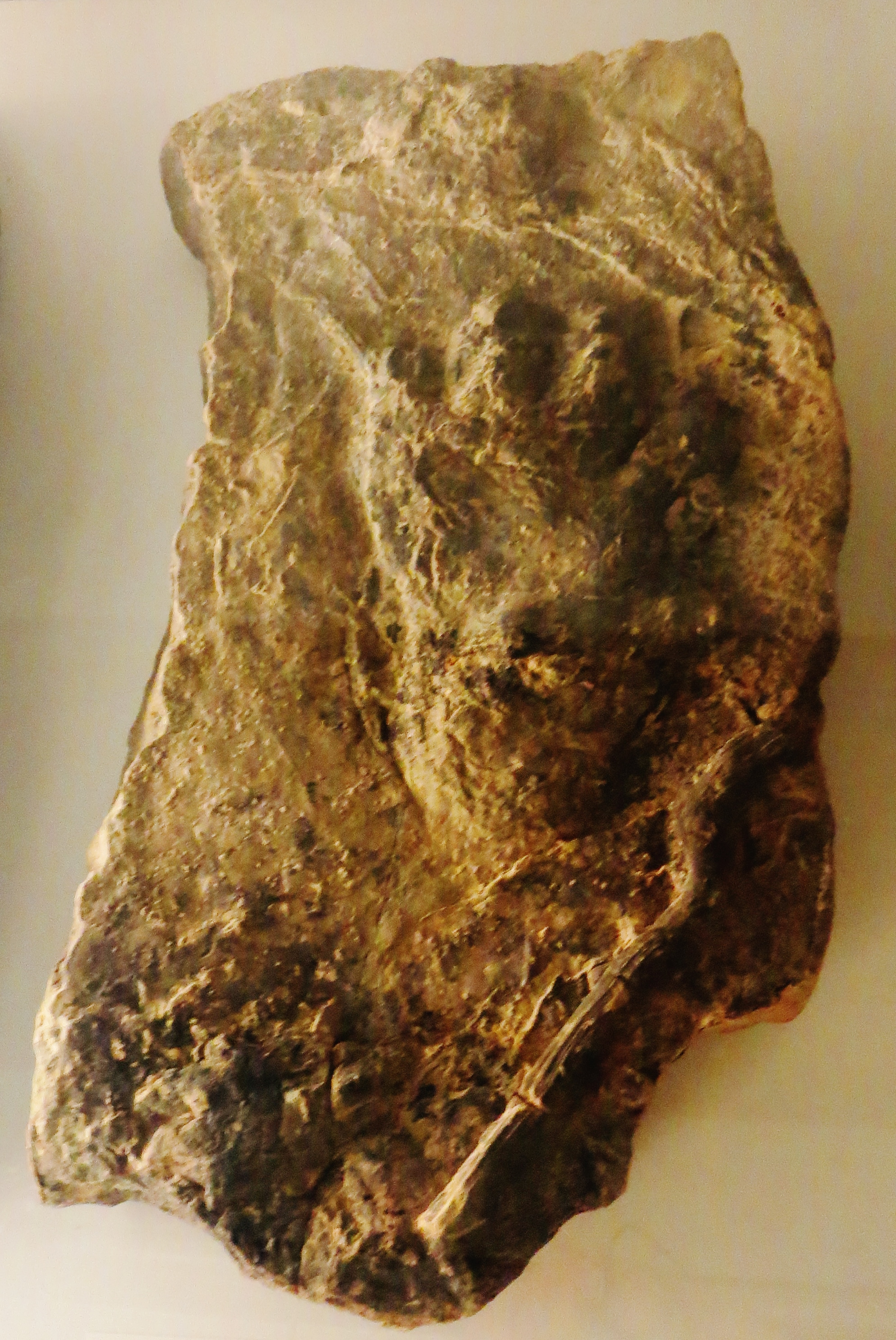
Footprint of Isochirotherium herculis

Species of Isochirotherium vary in size, with I. herculis being the largest by a wide margin. The length of the pes (foot) is approximately 300-350mm in length, correlating to an animal significantly larger than any known species of ctenosauriscid, estimated to be 5-6 meters in length. The pes has five digits, with digits I-IV being clawed and the fifth being smaller and clawless. Digits II and III are similar in length and the longest on the pes. The manus (hand) is digitigrade and the first digit is rarely preserved. Digits I-IV are clawed. The manus is much smaller than the pes, being relatively the smallest among all cheirotheriids with a length of approximately one-third of the pes on the individual preserved. Unlike Chirotherium, Isochirotherium trackways are typically straight, rather than meandering. Isochirotherium herculis trackways are narrow relative to the size of the animal, and indicate an erect stance with the limbs held below the body.

== Paleoenvironment ==
=== Isochirotherium herculis ===
Isochirotherium herculis trackways are known from the Middle Triassic, a time when the Tethys coastline was undergoing dramatic change. The uplift of mountains and marine regression made terrestrial reptile movement possible across areas previously restricted by the Tethys, and the presence of Isochirotherium herculis trackways alongside other large, terrestrial archosaurs in an intertidal flat potentially indicates migration and dispersal of large-bodied archosaurs and dinosauromorphs in Triassic Europe. The flat which preserves the longest known trackway of Isochirotherium herculis also includes a variety of other organisms, both marine and terrestrial. The footprints present were found with the remains of Nothosaurs inside them, as well as Hybodontiform fish. Additional tracks preserved alongside Isochirotherium herculis are those of Synaptichnium, Rhynchosauroides, Rotodactylus, and various Prolacertiform taxa. The Sabkha environment surrounding the trackways would have been highly saline and likely sparse or devoid of vegetation. Large-bodied predators like Isochirotherium herculis may have crossed the Sabkha following small reptile prey, which migrated to the shore during the mating season of extinct Horseshoe crabs. These intertidal flats were frequently flooded, but the tides were slow and shallow, allowing for good preservation quality of the trackways. The general ecosystem's geology and ecology has been noted as being similar to the intertidal flats of the UAE.

=== Isochirotherium delicatum ===
Isochirotherium delicatum is an ichnospecies with trackways known from the Southern Alps of Italy. It is one of the smallest ichnospecies in Isochirotherium, and is thought to represent a Proterochampsid archosaur trackmaker. Isochirotherium delicatum trackways represent animals from 40cm to 150cm in length. There are two distinct forms of I. delicatum, both of which coexisted with each other, and may represent similar species or intraspecific dimorphism. The second is more likely, as the ratio of 'slender' morph tracks to 'robust' morph tracks are almost 1:1, consistent with a large group with even numbers of male and female individuals. The distribution and number of the footprints of I. delicatum trackways have been used as evidence for social grouping and gregarious behavior, preserving the trackway of a large group composed predominantly of adult animals.
