= Argana Group =

- Stratigraphic range: Late Permian-Late Triassic
- Type: Group
- Unit of: High Atlas
- Sub-units: Irakern Formation, Timezgadiouine Formation, Bigoudine Formation

Lithology
- Primary: Sandstone
- Other: Shale, conglomerate

Location
- Coordinates: 31.0°N 9.0°W
- Approximate paleocoordinates: 7.4°N 5.9°W
- Region: Marrakesh Province
- Country: Morocco
- Argana Group (Morocco)

The Argana Group is a Permian to Triassic geological group in the western High Atlas northeast of Agadir, Morocco. Sometimes known as the Argana Formation, it contains eight geological members often divided into three formations. They include the Late Permian Ikakern Formation (members T1-T2), the Early Triassic to Carnian Timezgadiouine Formation (T3-T5), and the Late Triassic Bigoudine Formation (T6-T8). Ornithischian tracks are geographically located in Marrakesh province. Indeterminate theropod remains and tracks are geographically located in Marrakesh province.

== See also ==
- List of dinosaur-bearing rock formations
