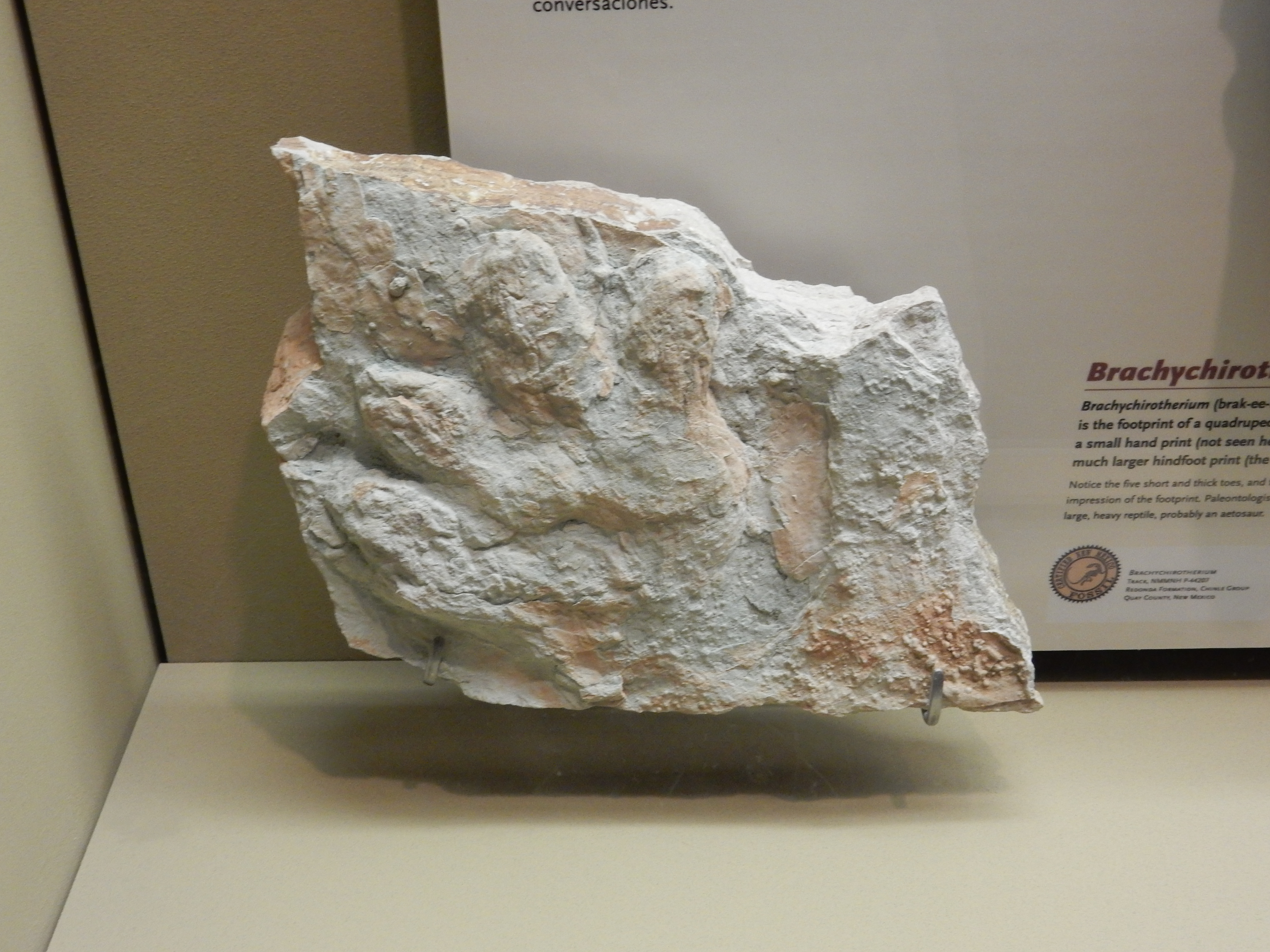
- Brachychirotherium sp. from the Redonda Formation of New Mexico (New Mexico Museum of Natural History and Science)

Trace fossil classification
- Kingdom: Animalia
- Phylum: Chordata
- Class: Reptilia
- Clade: Pseudosuchia
- Ichnofamily: †Chirotheriidae
- Ichnogenus: †Brachychirotherium; Beurlen, 1950

Ichnospecies
- See text

= Brachychirotherium =

Brachychirotherium Temporal range: Middle Triassic-Early Jurassic ~247–190 Ma

Ichnogenus of reptile footprints

Brachychirotherium is an ichnogenus, a form taxon based on footprints. It is a type of chirothere ('hand beast'), a term referring to the footprints of five-toed Triassic reptiles with a short fifth digit, leaving an appearance similar to a reverse human hand print. Brachychirotherium was first characterized from fossils found in Triassic beds in Germany, but has since been found in France, South Africa, Argentina, Greenland, Peru, Bolivia, and North America.

== Description ==
Front (manus) and rear (pes) footprints are distinguishable, though manus prints are not always preserved. The pes prints show five toes, which are proportionally shorter and stubbier than those of other chirotheres. Digit III is the longest, followed by digits II and IV, though they are all of a similar length. Digit I is notably shorter, and the impression of digit V is reduced to an oval pad at the sole. The manus prints likewise show up to five short digits, with the pad of digit V separate from the rest. The surfaces of the sole and palm are broad, and creases are indistinct. The prints were likely produced by some form of large pseudosuchian (reptiles related to crocodilians), such as aetosaurs or quadrupedal rauisuchids.

== Species ==
[incomplete list]

- B. circaparvum Willruth, 1971
- B. eyermani _{Baird, 1957}
- B. gallicum (Willruth, 1917)
- B. hassfurtenese Beurlen, 1950 (type species)
- B. lorteci Willruth, 1971
- B. thuringiacum (Ruhle von Lilienstern, 1938)
- B. tintati Willruth, 1971

== See also ==
- List of dinosaur ichnogenera
