= Protorabinae =

Protorabinae Temporal range: Hettangian–Turonian

Scientific classification
- Domain: Eukaryota
- Kingdom: Animalia
- Phylum: Arthropoda
- Class: Insecta
- Order: Coleoptera
- Suborder: Adephaga
- Family: Carabidae
- Subfamily: †Protorabinae; Ponomarenko, 1977

Subfamily of beetles

Protorabinae is an extinct subfamily of beetles in the family Carabidae. It contains 36 species in 13 genera, all extinct.

- Genus Aethocarabus Ren; Lu & Guo, 1995
  - Aethocarabus levigatus Ren; Lu & Guo, 1995
- Genus Atrirabus Hong & Wang, 1990
  - Atrirabus shandongensis Hong & Wang, 1990
  - Atrirabus tuanwangensis Hong & Wang, 1990
- Genus Cordorabus Ponomarenko, 1977
  - Cordorabus antennatus Ponomarenko, 1977 Karabastau Formation, Kazakhstan, Callovian/Oxfordian
  - Cordorabus minimus Ponomarenko, 1977 Karabastau Formation, Kazakhstan, Callovian/Oxfordian
  - Cordorabus notatus Ponomarenko, 1977 Karabastau Formation, Kazakhstan, Callovian/Oxfordian
  - Cordorabus striatus Ponomarenko, 1986 Gurvan-Eren Formation, Mongolia, Aptian
  - Cordorabus vittatus Ponomarenko, 1980 Mogotuin Formation, Mongolia, Aptian
- Genus Cretorabus Ponomarenko, 1977
  - Cretorabus capitatus Ponomarenko, 1977 Zaza Formation, Russia, Aptian
  - Cretorabus latus Ponomarenko, 1977 Zaza Formation, Russia, Aptian
  - Cretorabus medius Hong & Wang, 1990
  - Cretorabus orientalis Ponomarenko, 1989 Tsagaantsav Formation, Mongolia, Valanginian
  - Cretorabus ovalis Ponomarenko, 1989 Dzun-Bain Formation, Mongolia, Aptian
  - Cretorabus rasnitsyni Wang & Zhang, 2011 Yixian Formation, China, Aptian
  - Cretorabus sulcatus Ponomarenko, Coram & Jarzembowski, 2005 Lulworth Formation, United Kingdom, Berriasian
- Genus Denudirabus Ren; Lu & Guo, 1995
  - Denudirabus exstrius Ren; Liu & Guo, 1995
- Genus Lirabus Hong, 1992
  - Lirabus granulatus Hong, 1992
- Genus Lithorabus Ponomarenko, 1977
  - Lithorabus incertus Ponomarenko, 1977 Dzhil Formation, Kyrgyzstan Hettangian
- Genus Magnirabus Hong & Wang, 1990
  - Magnirabus furvus Hong & Wang, 1990
- Genus Mesorabus Ponomarenko, 1977
  - Mesorabus elongatus Ponomarenko, 1977
- Genus Nebrorabus Ponomarenko, 1989
  - Nebrorabus baculum Ponomarenko, 1989
  - Nebrorabus capitatus Ponomarenko, 1989
  - Nebrorabus elongatus (Ponomarenko, 1986)
  - Nebrorabus nebrioides Ponomarenko, 1989
- Genus Ovrabites Ponomarenko, 1977
  - Ovrabites incertus Ponomarenko, 1993 Emanra Formation, Russia, Turonian
  - Ovrabites jurassicus Ponomarenko, 1977 Karabastau Formation, Kazakhstan, Callovian/Oxfordian
  - Ovrabites ovalis Ponomarenko, 1977 Karabastau Formation, Kazakhstan, Callovian/Oxfordian
- Genus Penecupes Ren, 1995
  - Penecupes rapax Ren, 1995 Lushangfen Formation, China, Aptian
- Genus Protorabus Ponomarenko, 1977
  - Protorabus crassus Ponomarenko, 1989 Daya Formation, Russia, Hauterivian
  - Protorabus kobdoensis Ponomarenko, 1986 Gurvan-Eren Formation, Mongolia, Aptian
  - Protorabus magnus Ponomarenko, 1977 Karabastau Formation, Kazakhstan, Callovian/Oxfordian
  - Protorabus minisculus Zhang, 1997
  - Protorabus nigrimonticola Ponomarenko, 1977 Karabastau Formation, Kazakhstan, Callovian/Oxfordian
  - Protorabus planus Ponomarenko, 1977 Karabastau Formation, Kazakhstan, Callovian/Oxfordian
  - Protorabus polyphlebius Ren, 1995 Lushangfen Formation, China, Aptian
  - Protorabus tsaganensis Ponomarenko, 1989 Dzun-Bain Formation, Mongolia, Aptian
