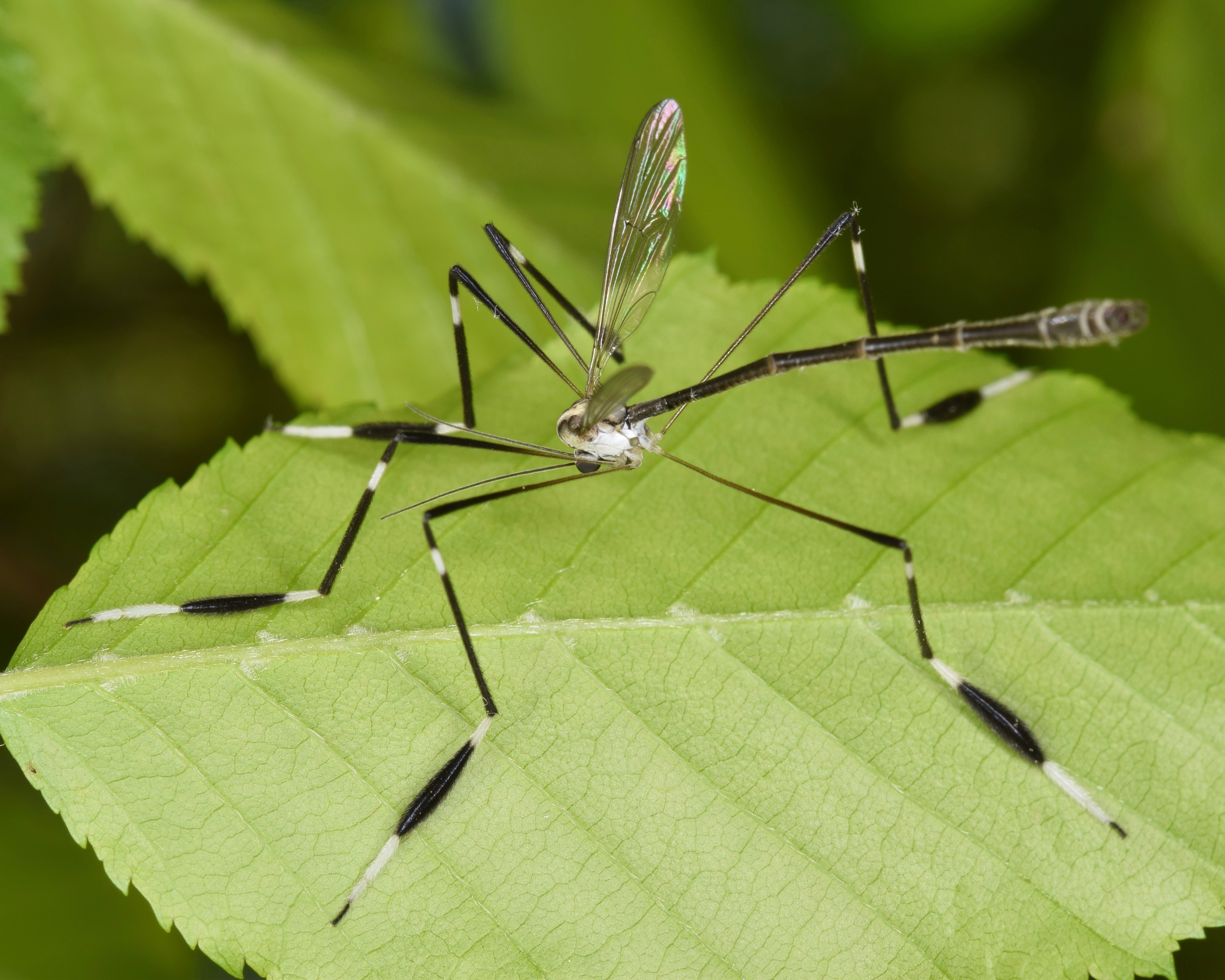

Scientific classification
- Kingdom: Animalia
- Phylum: Arthropoda
- Clade: Pancrustacea
- Class: Insecta
- Order: Diptera
- Family: Ptychopteridae
- Genus: Bittacomorpha
- Species: B. clavipes

Binomial name
- Bittacomorpha clavipes (Fabricius, 1781)

= Bittacomorpha clavipes =

Species of fly

Bittacomorpha clavipes, the eastern phantom crane fly, is a species of phantom crane fly in the family Ptychopteridae.

The eastern phantom crane fly is not to be confused with the other phantom crane flies, Bittacomorphella jonesi and Bittacomorpha occidentalis — the pygmy phantom crane fly and the western phantom crane fly.

The eastern phantom crane fly is distributed across Eastern North America, east of the Rocky Mountains, from late spring to early fall, in the fairly dense vegetation along the shady edges of wetlands.

== Anatomy and behavior ==
The eastern phantom crane fly is not large. The body is approximately a half inch long and its legs are thin and black with white sheaths near the tips.

When flying, Bittacomorpha uses the wings scarcely at all, relying in great measure upon wind currents for transportation. The legs are exceedingly light, as the exoskeleton is light and delicate, and encloses practically no tissue that can serve to increase their weight. As they expose a large surface, they offer great resistance to the air without adding appreciably to the insect’s weight.

A characteristic and unique feature of the family is a lobe at the base of the haltere called the prehaltere. The adults are found most often from late spring through to autumn in shaded, moist environments. Presumably adults feed little, if at all.

It appears to move randomly through the vegetation two or three feet off the ground. When it flies, its black tarsi will appear and disappear, leaving the white spots causing a shifting movement like a "phantom".

== Reproduction ==
Couples fly around in tandem. When both are in flight or hanging from a leaf, the male and female will mate.

After mating the female will dip the tip of her abdomen into the water, and deposit eggs (up to 300) singly or in small bunches. Duration for the eggs to hatch is reported at 7 days.

The larvae live in the top inch or so of substrate and feed on decaying material. They get the bulk of their air through a long, retractable breathing tube that they extend up through the surface film from the rear of their body.

The pupae possess a single, greatly elongated spiracular horn protruding from their thoraces. In Ptychoptera and Bittacomorpha, the right horn is elongated; in Bittacomorphella, the left. Reported times spent in this stage vary from 5 to 12 days.

There is one generation per year, and two generations per year in the northern areas of its range.

== Species comparison ==
The subfamily Bittacomorphinae (in the family Ptychopteridae) all exhibit a striking black and white coloration — hence the common name "phantom crane fly".

The eastern phantom crane fly is differentiated from the others by its range and amount of white on its thorax when compared with the western Bittacomorpha occidentalis, and has larger legs and tarsi than Bittacomorphella jonesi.

The larvae occur in wet swales and meadows for Ptychoptera; along lentic shorelines and alder swamps for Bittacomorpha.

In the pupae of Ptychoptera and Bittacomorpha, the right horn is elongated; in Bittacomorphella, the left horn is elongated.
