= Juraphididae =

Juraphididae Temporal range: Callovian–Turonian

Scientific classification
- Domain: Eukaryota
- Kingdom: Animalia
- Phylum: Arthropoda
- Class: Insecta
- Order: Hemiptera
- Suborder: Sternorrhyncha
- Infraorder: Aphidomorpha
- Superfamily: †Palaeoaphidoidea
- Family: †Juraphididae; Zyla, Blagoderov & Wegierek, 2014

Extinct family of true bugs

Juraphididae is an extinct family of aphids in the order Hemiptera. There are at least three genera and about five described species in Juraphididae. The most recent discovery in Juraphididae family was the Prolavexillapis munditia in 2018 and Isolitaphidae are synonymy with the Juraphididae

== Genera ==
These three genera belong to the family Juraphididae:

- † Aphaorus Wegierek, 1991 Tsagaantsav Formation, Mongolia, Lower Cretaceous
- †Isolitaphis Poinar 2017 Burmese amber, Myanmar, Cenomanian
- † Juraphis Shaposhnikov, 1979 Karabastau Formation, Kazakhstan, Oxfordian
- †Prolavexillaphis Liu et al. 2017 Burmese amber, Myanmar, Cenomanian
- † Pterotella Wegierek, 1991 Shar Teeg, Mongolia, Tithonian Hotont Formation, Mongolia, Lower Cretaceous
