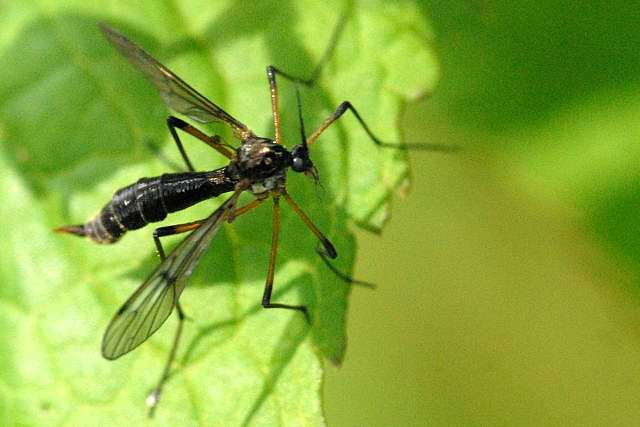
- Ptychoptera minuta, Belgium

Scientific classification
- Kingdom: Animalia
- Phylum: Arthropoda
- Class: Insecta
- Order: Diptera
- Family: Ptychopteridae
- Genus: Ptychoptera
- Species: P. minuta

Binomial name
- Ptychoptera minuta Tonnoir, 1919

= Ptychoptera minuta =

Species of fly

Ptychoptera minuta is a species of fly in the family Ptychopteridae. It is found in the Palearctic.
