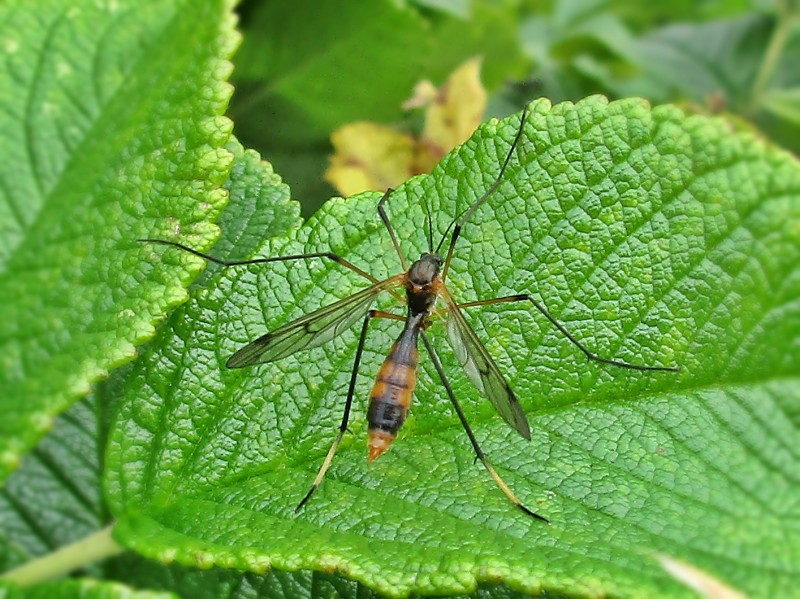
- Ptychoptera albimana Netherlands

Scientific classification
- Kingdom: Animalia
- Phylum: Arthropoda
- Class: Insecta
- Order: Diptera
- Family: Ptychopteridae
- Genus: Ptychoptera
- Species: P. albimana

Binomial name
- Ptychoptera albimana (Fabricius, 1787)

= Ptychoptera albimana =

Species of fly

Ptychoptera albimana is a species of fly in the family Ptychopteridae. It can be found throughout the Palearctic but commonly found throughout Britain.

== Description ==
The body of Ptychoptera albimana is mostly black with distinct orange marking, usually on the dorsal section. The insect is most active between spring and fall, with the female laying 500 eggs.
