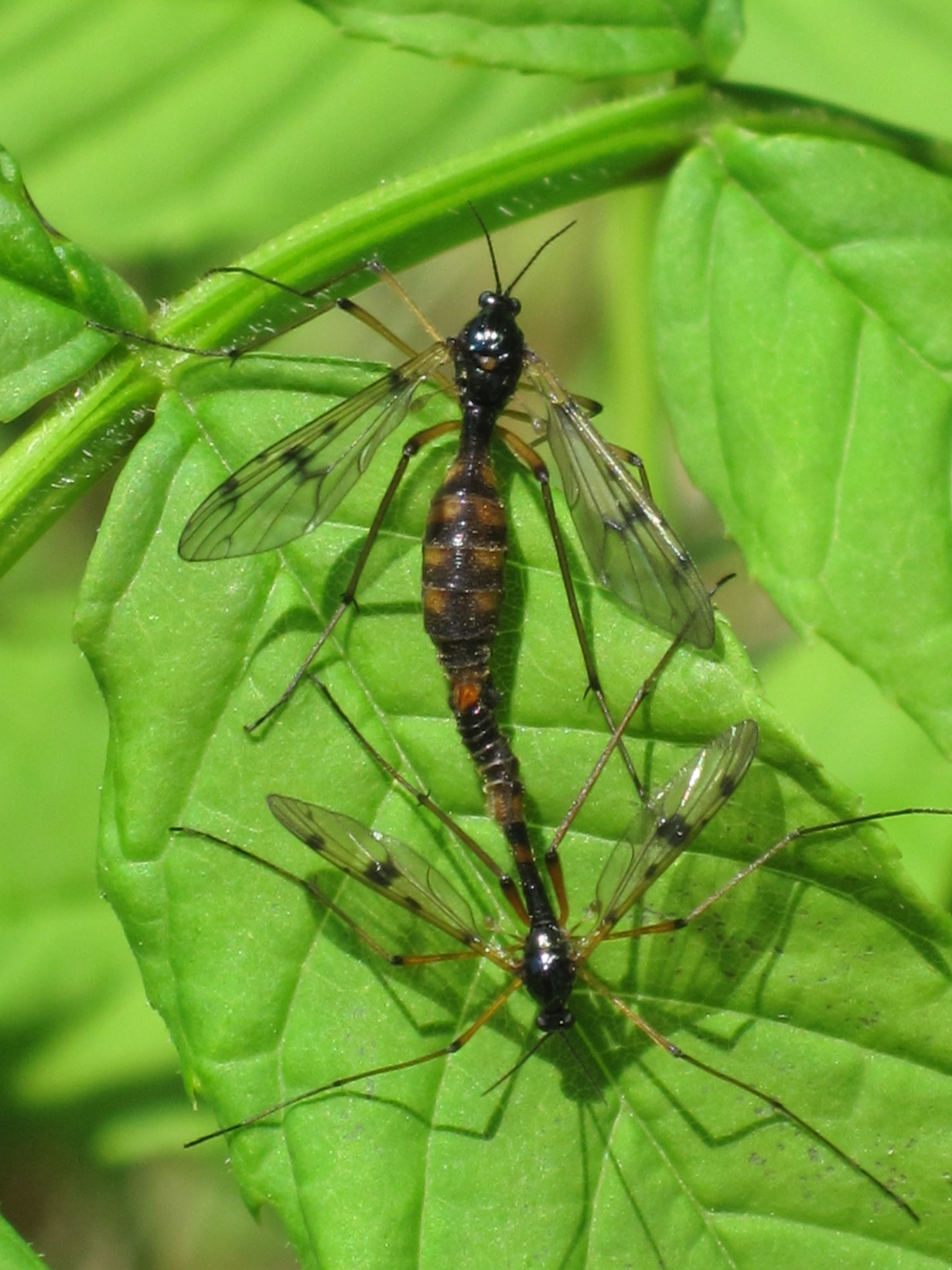
- Ptychoptera contaminata Netherlands

Scientific classification
- Kingdom: Animalia
- Phylum: Arthropoda
- Class: Insecta
- Order: Diptera
- Family: Ptychopteridae
- Genus: Ptychoptera
- Species: P. contaminata

Binomial name
- Ptychoptera contaminata (Linnaeus, 1758)

= Ptychoptera contaminata =

Species of fly

Ptychoptera contaminata, commonly known as the orange-marked cranefly, is a species of fly in the family Ptychopteridae. It is found in the Palearctic.
