= Protoplasa =

Scientific classification
- Kingdom: Animalia
- Phylum: Arthropoda
- Class: Insecta
- Order: Diptera
- Family: Tanyderidae
- Genus: Protoplasa; Osten-Sacken, 1859
- Species: P. fitchii

Binomial name
- Protoplasa fitchii Osten Sacken, 1859

Genus of flies

Protoplasa is a genus of primitive crane flies in the family Tanyderidae. There is one described species in Protoplasa, P. fitchii.
