= Tsagaantsav Formation =

Early Cretaceous geologic formation in Mongolia

- Stratigraphic range: Hauterivian-Barremian; 131–126 Ma
- Type: Geological formation
- Underlies: Zuunbayan Formation, Shinekhudag Formation
- Overlies: Basement

Lithology
- Primary: Sandstone, siltstone

Location
- Coordinates: 44.9°N 110.4°E
- Approximate paleocoordinates: 46.7°N 112.3°E
- Region: Khovd, Uvs, Dornogovi & Övörkhangai Provinces
- Country: Mongolia

Type section
- Named for: Tsagan-Tsab well
- Tsagaantsav Formation (Mongolia)

The Tsagaantsav Formation, Tsagantsab Formation or Tsagan-Tsab Formation (Russian: Tsagaantsav Svita) is an Early Cretaceous (Hauterivian to Barremian) geologic formation in Mongolia. Indeterminate sauropod and psittacosaurid remains have been recovered from the formation. Remains of the pterosaur Noripterus, which were originally given their own genus, "Phobetor" have also been recovered from the formation.

Graham et al. 2001 reported radiometric dates of 131 and 126 Ma from the formation.

== Fossil content ==
The following fossils were reported from the fluvial to lacustrine sandstones and siltstones of the formation:

- Pterosaurs
  - Noripterus complicidens
- Dinosaurs
  - Psittacosaurus sp.
  - Sauropoda indet.
  - Theropoda indet.
- Lizards
  - Dorsetisauridae indet.

Insects

- Khutelchalcis gobiensis
- Eopelecinus fragilis
- E. minutus
- Praeichneumon townesi
- Eobraconus inopinatus
- Westratia femorata
- W. pachygaster
- W. pentadecamera
- Langtonius cynaricaudatus
- Eugenodiamesa makarchenkoi
- Jurochlus adustus
- Ellia khara
- Protanyderus mesozoicus
- Metatrichopteridium cladistorum
- Plectrocentropus sulis
- Eoclipsis mongolica
- Coptoclavisca nigricollinus
- Cretorabus orientalis
- Mesaclopus mongolicus
- Chinocimberis dispersus
- Megametrioxenoides longus
- Uroperla lacerata
- Trianguliperla quassa
- Aphaorus curtipes
- Juleyrodes ?gilli
- Izinabis kerzhneri
- Siberiogenites medius
- Torephemera longipes
- Leptoneta calyptrata
- Albisca tracheata
- Epeoromimus infractus
- Osmylogramma martinsoni
- Juraphididae indet.

== See also ==
- List of dinosaur-bearing rock formations
  - List of stratigraphic units with indeterminate dinosaur fossils
- List of pterosaur-bearing stratigraphic units
- Andaikhudag Formation
