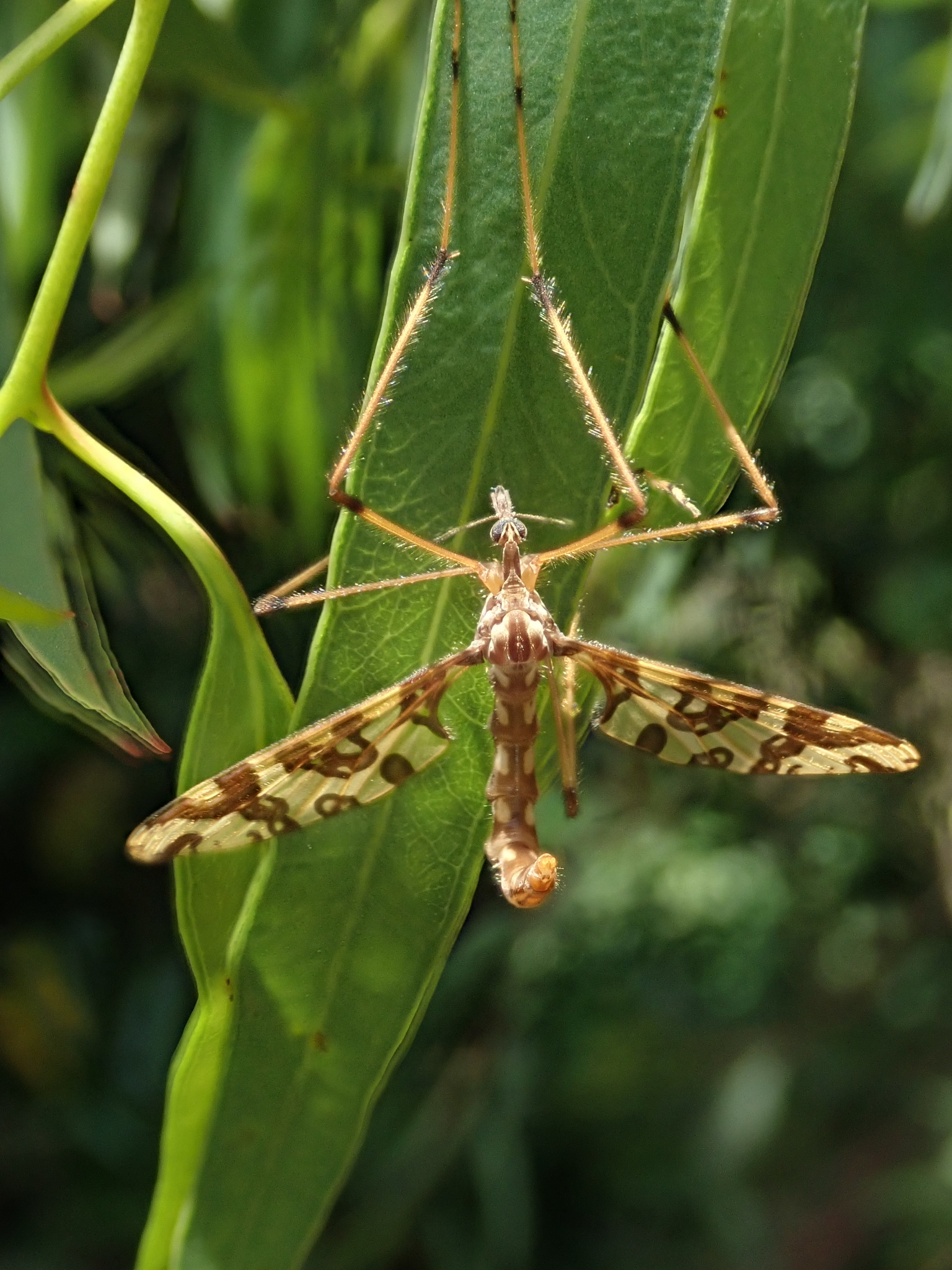
- Mischoderus annuliferus

Scientific classification
- Kingdom: Animalia
- Phylum: Arthropoda
- Class: Insecta
- Order: Diptera
- Infraorder: Psychodomorpha
- Family: Tanyderidae; Osten-Sacken, 1880

Genera
- †Espanoderus; Protanyderus; Protoplasa; †Nannotanyderus; †Similinannotanyderus; Tanyderus

Synonyms
- Macrochilidae

= Tanyderidae =

Tanyderidae Temporal range: Norian–Recent

Family of flies

Tanyderidae, sometimes called primitive crane flies, are long, delicate flies with spotted or mottled wings, superficially resembling true crane flies (Tipulidae). Adults are typically found resting on vegetation near streams, while larvae occur in wet, decaying wood or along sandy and gravelly stream margins. Several fossil species are also known.

== Description and distribution ==
Members of the family Tanyderidae resemble medium- to large-sized crane flies but retain a number of primitive features, including the full complement of five branches of the radial wing vein—structures that have been lost in most modern flies. These characteristics, combined with their limited diversity of about forty known species, suggest that the group represents a relict lineage within the Nematocera.

Their distribution is fragmented across temperate regions of both hemispheres, with species recorded from southern Africa, Australia, New Zealand, and both North and South America. Tanyderidae are relatively common in southern Chile and New Zealand, where larvae inhabit submerged wood or coarse gravel in flowing streams, but are infrequently encountered elsewhere.

Adult tanyderids are easily recognized by their patterned wings and are often found hanging beneath bridges or from streamside vegetation. Like many lower Diptera, they are frequently attracted to artificial lights at night.

== Taxonomy ==
Based on

- Nannotanyderinae
  - †Coramus
    - Coramus gedanensis Baltic amber, Eocene 37.2 - 33.9 Ma
  - †Dacochile Poinar & Brown, 2004
    - Dacochile microsoma, Burmese amber, Myanmar, Late Cretaceous (Cenomanian), 99 Ma
  - †Nannotanyderus
    - Nannotanyderus ansorgei Lebanese amber, Early Cretaceous (Barremian), 130-125 Ma
    - Nannotanyderus grimmenensis "Green Series", Germany, Early Jurassic (Toarcian) 183 - 182 Ma
    - Nannotanyderus incertus Shar-Teg, Mongolia, Late Jurassic (Tithonian), 150.8 - 145.5 Ma
    - Nannotanyderus krzeminskii "Green Series", Germany, Toarcian, 183 - 182 Ma
    - Nannotanyderus kubekovensis Karabastau Formation, Kazakhstan Middle/Late Jurassic (Callovian/Oxfordian) 164.7 - 155.7 Ma
    - Nannotanyderus oliviae Charmouth Mudstone Formation, United Kingdom, Early Jurassic (Sinemurian), 196.5 - 189.6 Ma
  - Peringueyomyina
    - Peringueyomyina barnardi South Africa
- Tanyderinae
  - †Espanoderus
    - Espanoderus barbarae Alava amber (Escucha Formation), Spain, Early Cretaceous (Albian) 105.3 - 99.7 Ma
    - Espanoderus orientalis Burmese amber, Myanmar, Cenomanian, 99 Ma
  - †Similinannotanyderus
    - Similinannotanyderus lii Burmese amber, Myanmar, Cenomanian, 99 Ma
    - Similinannotanyderus longitergata Burmese amber, Myanmar, Cenomanian, 99 Ma
    - Similinannotanyderus zbigniewi Burmese amber, Myanmar, Cenomanian, 99 Ma
  - †Macrochile
    - Macrochile spectrum Baltic amber, Eocene 37.2 - 33.9 Ma
    - Macrochile hornei Baltic amber, Eocene 37.2 - 33.9 Ma
  - †Podemacrochile
    - Podemacrochile baltica Baltic amber, Eocene 37.2 - 33.9 Ma
  - †Praemacrochile
    - Praemacrochile ansorgei Daohugou, China, Karabastau Formation, Kazakhstan Shar-Teg, Mongolia, Middle-Late Jurassic 164.7 to 145.5 Ma
    - Praemacrochile chinensis Daohugou, China, Callovian/Oxfordian ~ 160 Ma
    - Praemacrochile decipiens Posidonia Shale, Germany, Toarcian 183.0 to 182.0 Ma
    - Praemacrochile dobbertinensis, "Green Series", Germany, Toarcian 183.0 to 182.0 Ma
    - Praemacrochile dryasis Daohugou, China, Callovian/Oxfordian ~ 160 Ma
    - Praemacrochile kaluginae Karabastau Formation, Kazakhstan Callovian/Oxfordian 164.7 to 155.7 Ma
    - Praemacrochile ovalum Daohugou, China, Callovian/Oxfordian ~ 160 Ma
    - Praemacrochile stackelbergi Ichetuy Formation, Russia, Late Jurassic (Oxfordian) 159-156 Ma
  - Protanyderus (extinct) Note: Lukashevich (2018) considers the assignation of these species to the living genus to be "in doubt" due to differing morphological characters
    - Protanyderus astictum Daohugou, China, Callovian/Oxfordian ~ 160 Ma
    - Protanyderus invalidus Itat Formation, Russia, Middle Jurassic (Bajocian-Bathonian) 171.6 - 164.7 Ma
    - Protanyderus mesozoicus Tsagaantsav Formation, Mongolia, Barremian, 130-125 Ma
    - Protanyderus nebulosus Shar-Teg, Mongolia, Tithonian, 150.8 - 145.5 Ma
    - Protanyderus savtchenkoi Karabastau Formation, Kazakhstan Callovian/Oxfordian 164.7 to 155.7 Ma
    - Protanyderus senilis Shar-Teg, Mongolia, Tithonian, 150.8 - 145.5 Ma
    - Protanyderus vetus Shar-Teg, Mongolia, Tithonian, 150.8 - 145.5 Ma
    - Protanyderus vulcanium Daohugou, China, Callovian/Oxfordian ~ 160 Ma
  - Araucoderus
    - Araucoderus gloriosus, Chile
  - Eutanyderus
    - Eutanyderus oreonympha Australia
    - Eutanyderus wilsoni Australia
  - Mischoderus
    - Mischoderus annuliferus (Hutton, 1901), New Zealand
    - Mischoderus forcipatus (Osten Sacken, 1880) New Zealand
    - Mischoderus marginatus (Edwards 1923), New Zealand
    - Mischoderus neptunus (Edwards 1923), New Zealand
    - Mischoderus varipes (Edwards 1923), New Zealand
  - Neoderus
    - Neoderus chonos Chile
    - Neoderus patagonicus Chile
  - Nothoderus
    - Nothoderus australiensis Tasmania
  - Protoplasa
    - Protoplasa fitchii, United States
  - Protanyderus (extant) Note: Villanueva (2017) considers Protanyderus to be a junior synonym of Protoplasa
    - Protanyderus alexanderi Kariya 1935 Japan (Shimajima-Dani)
    - Protanyderus beckeri (Riedel), 1920. Turkestan (Osch-Fergana)
    - Protanyderus esakii Alexander 1932 . Japan (Kyushu)
    - Protanyderus margarita Alexander 1948 USA (Rocky Mountains).
    - Protanyderus redeli Savchenko 1974 USSR (Gissar Range).
    - Protanyderus schmidi Alexander 1959 India (Uttar Pradesh)
    - Protanyderus sikkimensis Alexander 1961 India (Ramtang).
    - Protanyderus stackelbergi Savchenko 1971 Mongolia (Gatsur)
    - Protanyderus vanduzeei (Alexander 1918) USA (California).
    - Protanyderus venustipes Alexander 1961 India (Ramtang).
    - Protanyderus vipio (Osten Sacken 1877) USA (California).
    - Protanyderus yankovskyi Alexnder 1938 North Korea
  - Radinoderus
    - Radinoderus caledoniana Hynes, 1993 (New Caledonia)
    - Radinoderus dorrigensis Alexander, 1930. Australia (New South Wales).
    - Radinoderus holwai Alexander, 1946. Solomon Islands.
    - Radinoderus mirabilis (De Meijere), 1915a. Papua New Guinea.
    - Radinoderus occidentalis (Alexander), 1925. Australia (West Australia).
    - Radinoderus ochroceratus Colless, 1962. Papua New Guinea (Bouganville Island).
    - Radinoderus oculatus (Riedel), 1921. Papua New Guinea (PNG)
    - Radinoderus ornatissimus (Doleschall), 1858. Indonesia (Maluku).
    - Radinoderus pictipes Alexander, 1946. Indonesia (Irian Jaya).
    - Radinoderus solomonis (Alexander), 1924. Solomon Islands.
    - Radinoderus supernumerarius Alexander, 1953. Indonesia (Irian Jaya).
    - Radinoderus terrae-reginae (Alexander), 1924. Australia (Queensland)
    - Radinoderus toxopei Alexander, 1959a. Indonesia (Irian Jaya).
  - Tanyderus
    - Tanyderus pictus Philippi 1865 Chile, Concepcion
- not assigned to a subfamily
  - †Larvaderus
    - Larvaderus triassicus Upper Keuper, Germany, Late Triassic (Norian)
