= Khutelchalcis =

Khutelchalcis Temporal range: 140.2–125.45 Ma

Scientific classification
- Kingdom: Animalia
- Phylum: Arthropoda
- Class: Insecta
- Order: Hymenoptera
- Family: †Khutelchalcididae; Rasnitsy et al., 2004
- Genus: †Khutelchalcis; Rasnitsyn et al., 2004
- Species: †K. gobiensis

Binomial name
- †Khutelchalcis gobiensis Rasnitsyn et al., 2004

Extinct family of chalcid wasp

Khutelchalcis was an extinct genus of apocritan wasp, and the only member of the family Khutelchalcididae. It is only known from a single species, (Khutelchalcis gobiensis) described from the Early Cretaceous Tsagaantsav Formation of Mongolia.
