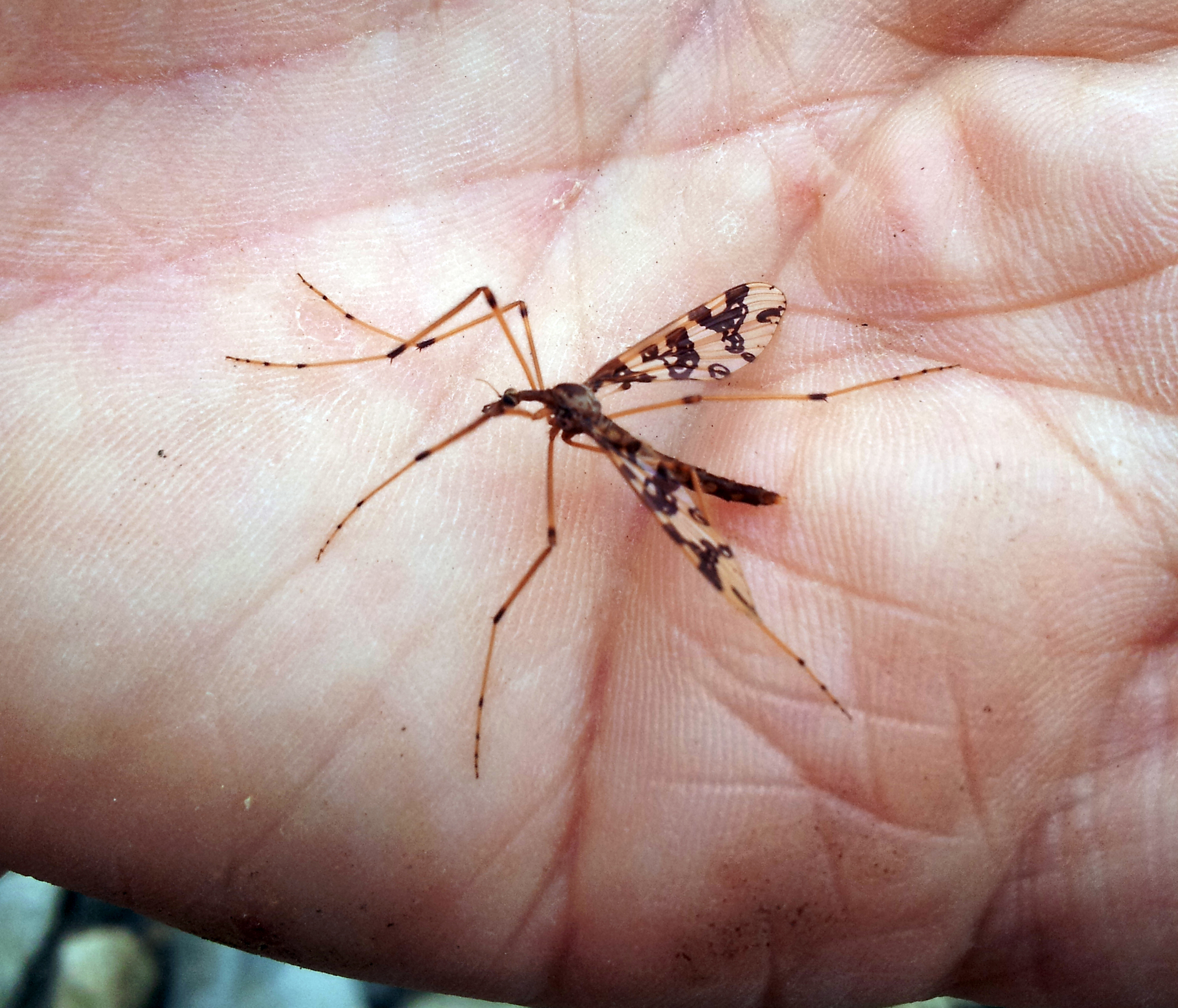
- Mischoderus annuliferus

Scientific classification
- Kingdom: Animalia
- Phylum: Arthropoda
- Clade: Pancrustacea
- Class: Insecta
- Order: Diptera
- Family: Tanyderidae
- Genus: Mischoderus; Handlirsch, 1909

= Mischoderus =

Genus of insects

Mischoderus is a genus of primitive craneflies that are native to New Zealand. They lie in the family Tanyderidae.

== Description ==
Mischoderus larvae differ from Tipulidae craneflies in that their head is outside of their body, instead of being retracted. Thoracic prolegs are not present in this genus. There are prolegs present at the end of the abdomen. The larvae also do not have a spiracular disk, but instead they have tentacle-like filaments. Some have only two filaments, while others have a large cluster.

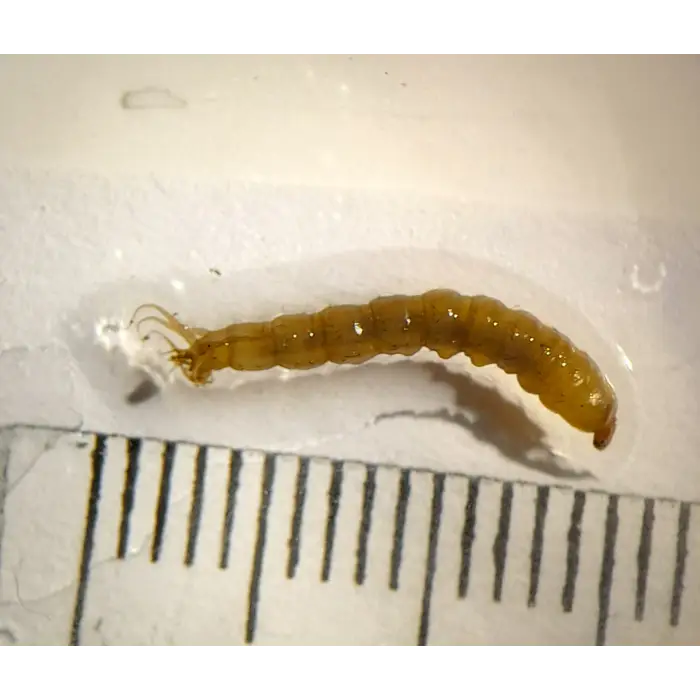
Mischoderus larva © Auckland Museum

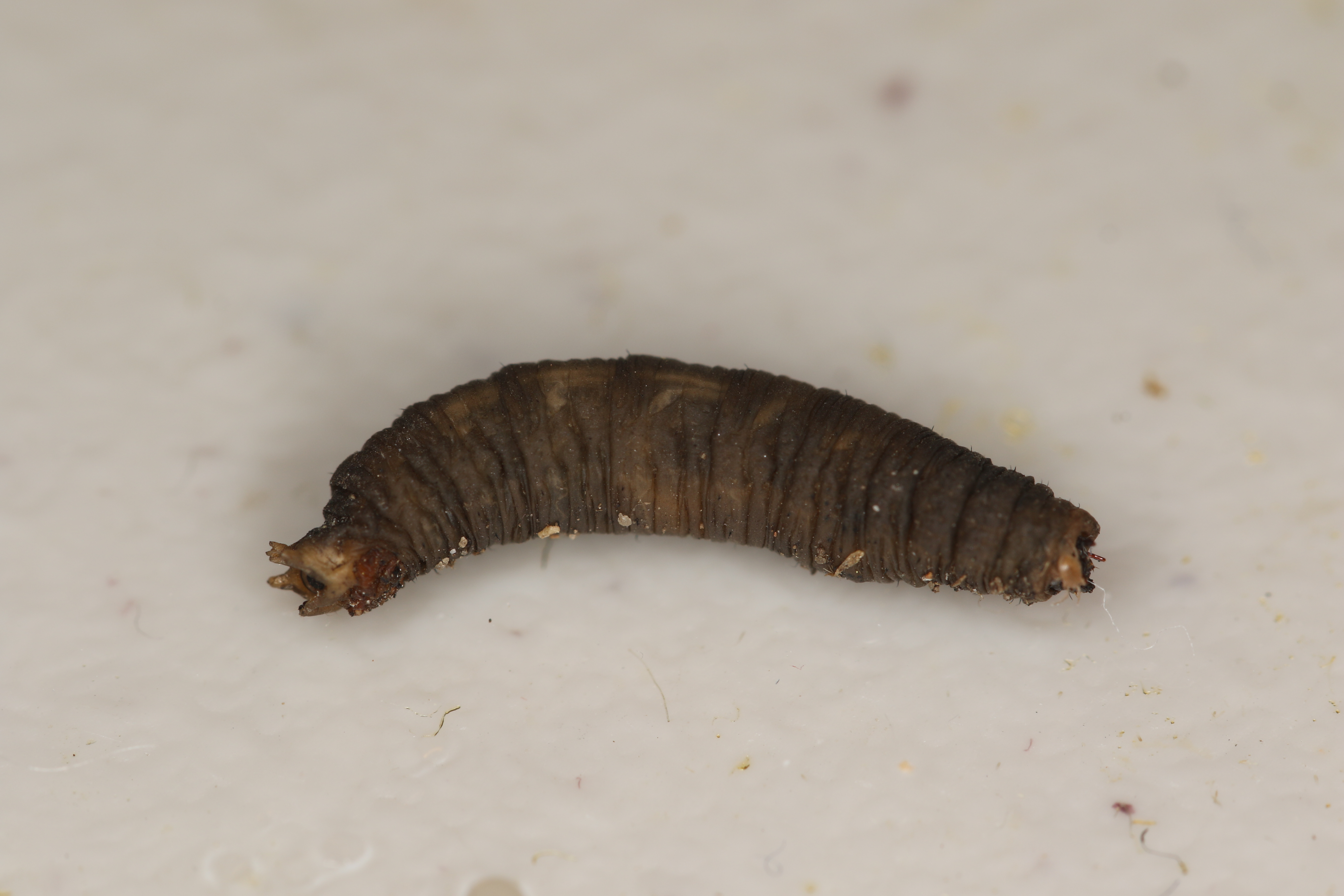
A Tipulidae larva, to compare to the Mischoderus larva

== Taxonomy ==
There are five species in the genus Mischoderus:

- Mischoderus annuliferus
- Mischoderus forcipatus
- Mischoderus marginatus
- Mischoderus neptunus
- Mischoderus varipes
