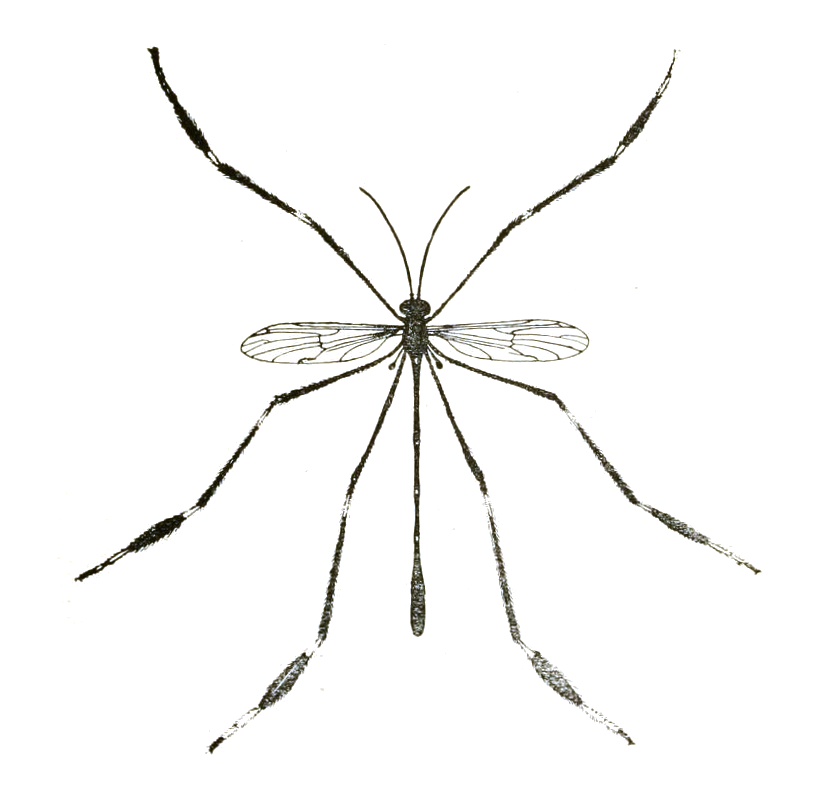
- Bittacomorpha clavipes

Scientific classification
- Domain: Eukaryota
- Kingdom: Animalia
- Phylum: Arthropoda
- Class: Insecta
- Order: Diptera
- Family: Ptychopteridae
- Genus: Bittacomorpha; Westwood, 1835

= Bittacomorpha =

Genus of flies

Bittacomorpha is a genus of phantom crane flies in the family Ptychopteridae. There are about 11 described species in Bittacomorpha.

== Species ==
These 11 species belong to the genus Bittacomorpha:

- Bittacomorpha affinis
- Bittacomorpha cinctellus
- Bittacomorpha clavipes (Fabricius, 1781) (phantom crane fly)
- Bittacomorpha leachi
- Bittacomorpha occidentalis Aldrich, 1895
- Bittacomorpha ornatellus
- Bittacomorpha pictodes
- Bittacomorpha plicipennis
- Bittacomorpha quadripustulatus
- Bittacomorpha subplicatus
- Bittacomorpha subtilis
