= Bittacomorphella =

Scientific classification
- Kingdom: Animalia
- Phylum: Arthropoda
- Class: Insecta
- Order: Diptera
- Family: Ptychopteridae
- Genus: Bittacomorphella; Alexander, 1916

Genus of flies

Bittacomorphella is a genus of pygmy phantom crane flies in the family Ptychopteridae. There are about 11 described species in Bittacomorphella.

== Species ==
These 11 species belong to the genus Bittacomorphella:

- Bittacomorphella esakii Tokunaga, 1938
- Bittacomorphella fenderiana Alexander, 1947
- Bittacomorphella furcata Fasbender & Courtney, 2017
- Bittacomorphella gongshana
- Bittacomorphella jonesi (Johnson, 1905) (pygmy phantom crane fly)
- Bittacomorphella lini Young & Fang, 2011
- Bittacomorphella nipponensis Alexander, 1924
- Bittacomorphella pacifica Alexander, 1958
- Bittacomorphella sackenii (Roder, 1890)
- Bittacomorphella thaiensis Alexander, 1953
- Bittacomorphella zhaotongensis
