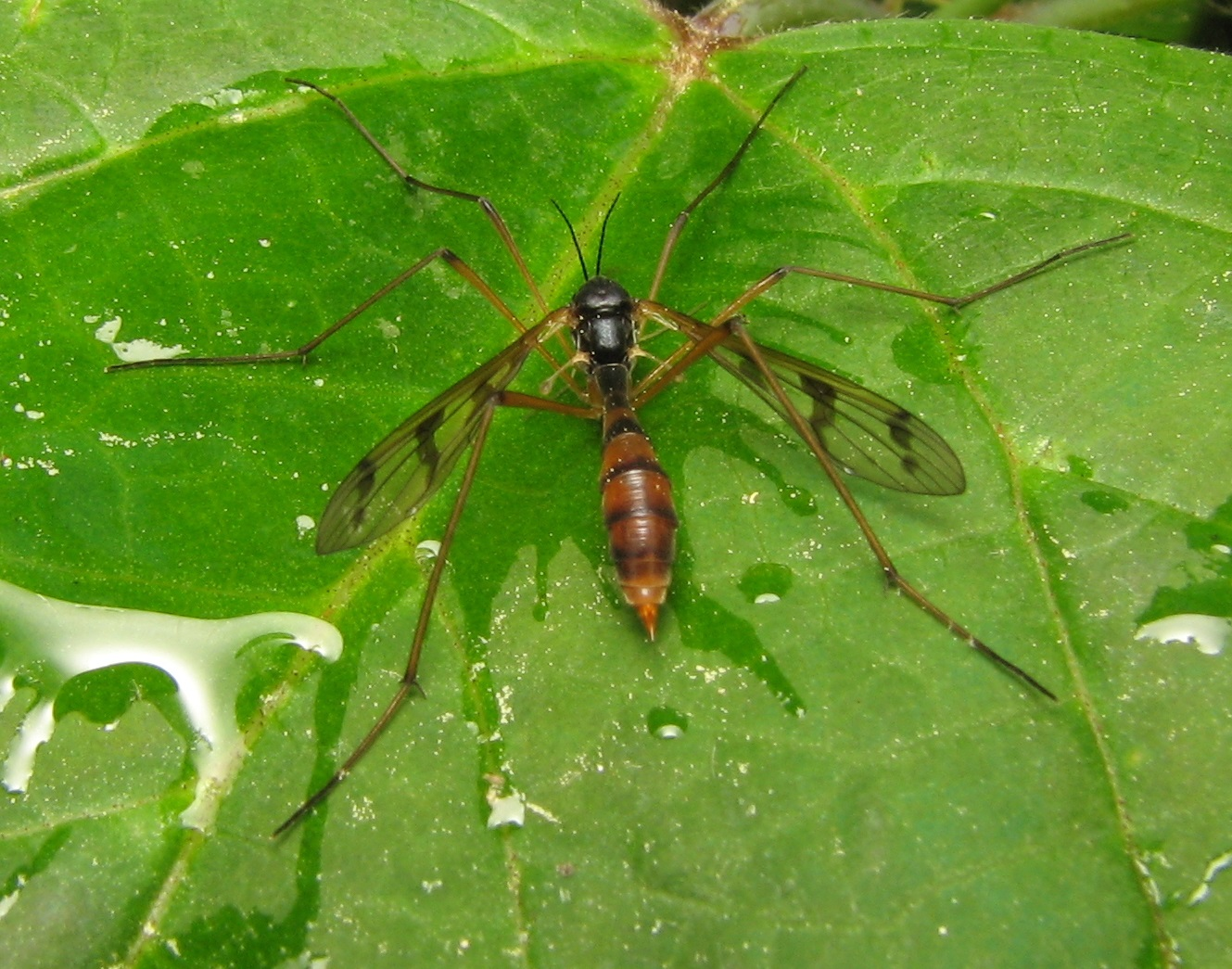

Scientific classification
- Domain: Eukaryota
- Kingdom: Animalia
- Phylum: Arthropoda
- Class: Insecta
- Order: Diptera
- Family: Ptychopteridae
- Genus: Ptychoptera
- Species: P. quadrifasciata

Binomial name
- Ptychoptera quadrifasciata Say, 1824

Synonyms
- Ptychoptera rufocincta Osten Sacken, 1859

= Ptychoptera quadrifasciata =

Species of fly

Ptychoptera quadrifasciata is a species of phantom crane flies in the family Ptychopteridae.
