= Ptychoptera townesi =

Scientific classification
- Domain: Eukaryota
- Kingdom: Animalia
- Phylum: Arthropoda
- Class: Insecta
- Order: Diptera
- Family: Ptychopteridae
- Genus: Ptychoptera
- Species: P. townesi

Binomial name
- Ptychoptera townesi Alexander, 1943

Species of fly

Ptychoptera townesi is a species of phantom crane flies in the family Ptychopteridae.
