= Ptychoptera sculleni =

Scientific classification
- Kingdom: Animalia
- Phylum: Arthropoda
- Class: Insecta
- Order: Diptera
- Family: Ptychopteridae
- Genus: Ptychoptera
- Species: P. sculleni

Binomial name
- Ptychoptera sculleni Alexander, 1943

Species of fly

Ptychoptera sculleni is a species of phantom crane flies in the family Ptychopteridae. It can be found in the far western portion of the United States, namely the states of California, Oregon, and Washington.
