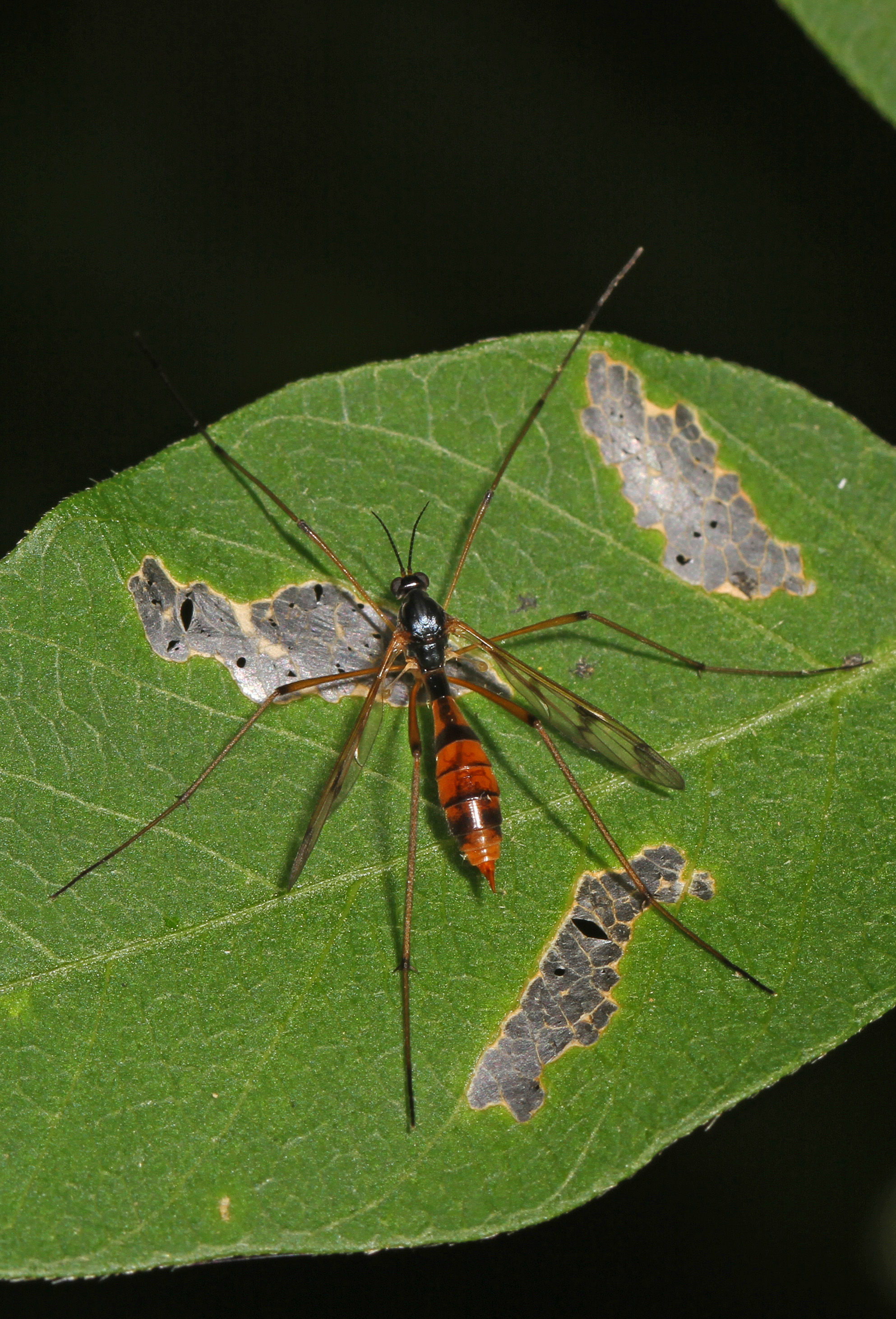

Scientific classification
- Kingdom: Animalia
- Phylum: Arthropoda
- Class: Insecta
- Order: Diptera
- Family: Ptychopteridae
- Genus: Ptychoptera; Meigen, 1803

= Ptychoptera =

Genus of flies

Ptychoptera is a genus of phantom crane flies in the family Ptychopteridae. There are at least 70 described species in Ptychoptera.

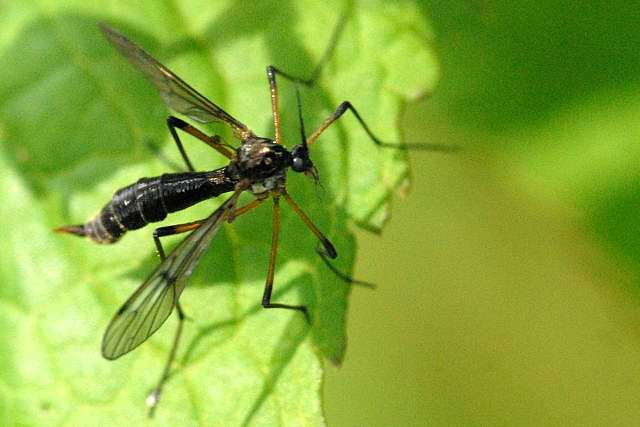
Ptychoptera minuta

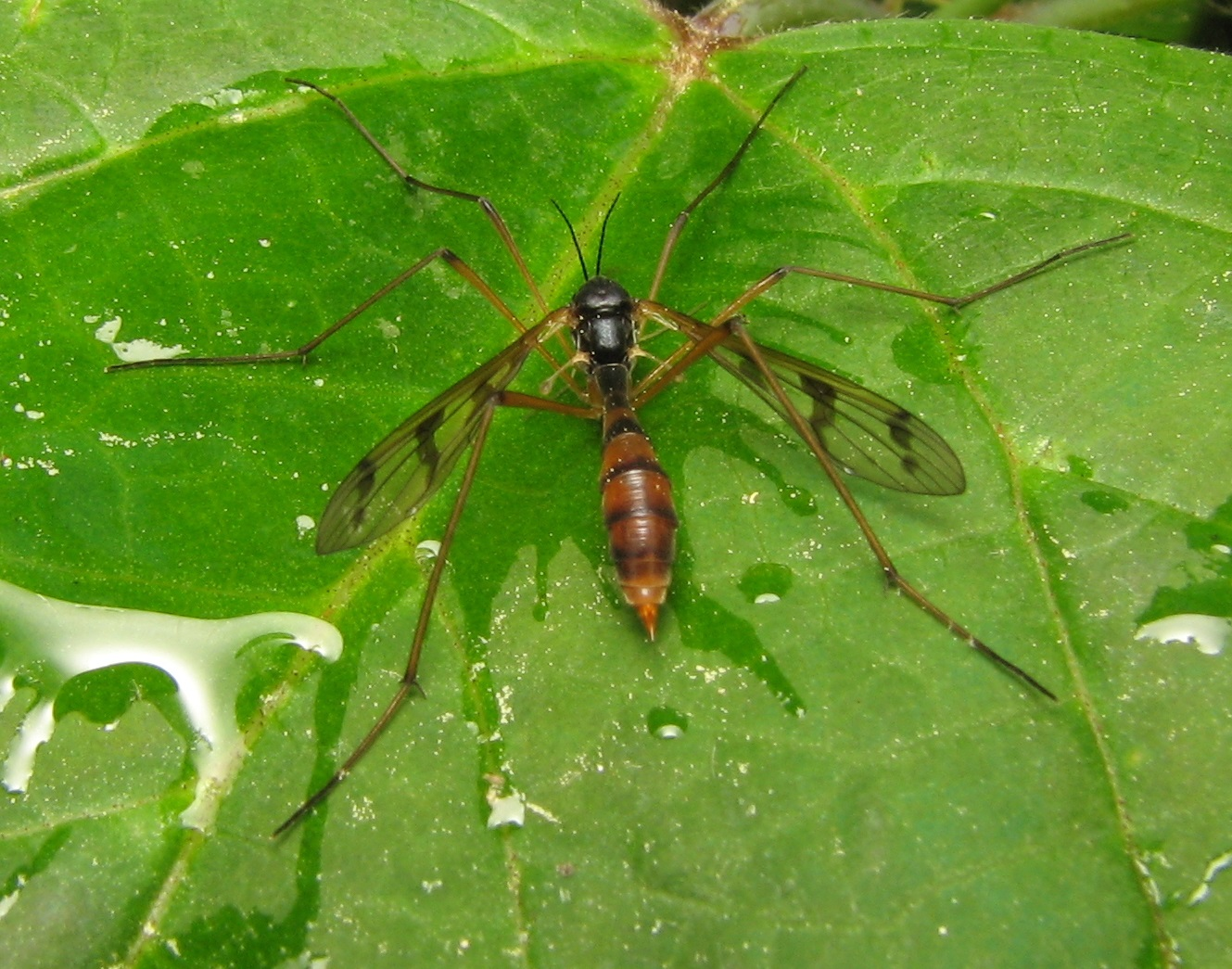
Ptychoptera quadrifasciata

== Species ==
These 76 species belong to the genus Ptychoptera:

- Ptychoptera africana Alexander, 1920^{c g}
- Ptychoptera agnes Krzeminski & Zwick, 1993^{c g}
- Ptychoptera albimana (Fabricius, 1787)^{c g}
- Ptychoptera alexanderi Hancock, Marcos-Garcia & Rotheray, 2006^{c g}
- Ptychoptera alina Krzeminski & Zwick, 1993^{c g}
- Ptychoptera annandalei Brunetti, 1918^{c g}
- Ptychoptera bannaensis^{g}
- Ptychoptera bellula Alexander, 1937^{c g}
- Ptychoptera byersi Alexander, 1966^{i c g}
- Ptychoptera camerounensis Alexander, 1921^{c g}
- Ptychoptera capensis Alexander, 1917^{c g}
- Ptychoptera chalybeata Alexander, 1956^{c g}
- Ptychoptera clitellaria Alexander, 1935^{c g}
- Ptychoptera coloradensis Alexander, 1937^{i c g}
- Ptychoptera contaminata (Linnaeus, 1758)^{c g}
- Ptychoptera daimio Alexander, 1921^{c g}
- Ptychoptera deleta Novak, 1877^{g}
- Ptychoptera delmastroi Zwick & Stary, 2002^{c g}
- Ptychoptera distincta Brunetti, 1911^{c g}
- Ptychoptera formosensis Alexander, 1924^{c g}
- Ptychoptera garhwalensis Alexander, 1959^{c g}
- Ptychoptera gutianshana Yang & Chen, 1995^{c g}
- Ptychoptera handlirschi (Czizek, 1919)^{c g}
- Ptychoptera helena (Peus, 1958)^{c g}
- Ptychoptera hugoi Tjeder, 1968^{c g}
- Ptychoptera ichitai Nakamura & Saigusa, 2009^{c g}
- Ptychoptera ichneumonoidea Alexander, 1946^{c g}
- Ptychoptera japonica Alexander, 1913^{c g}
- Ptychoptera javensis Alexander, 1937^{c g}
- Ptychoptera kosiensis Stuckenberg, 1983^{c g}
- Ptychoptera kyushuensis Nakamura & Saigusa, 2009^{c g}
- Ptychoptera lacustris Meigen, 1830^{c g}
- Ptychoptera lenis Osten Sacken, 1877^{c g}
- Ptychoptera lenta (Harris, 1776)^{c g}
- Ptychoptera lii^{g}
- Ptychoptera longicauda (Tonnoir, 1919)^{c g}
- Ptychoptera longwangshana Yang & Chen, 1998^{c g}
- Ptychoptera lushuiensis^{g}
- Ptychoptera madagascariensis Alexander, 1937^{c g}
- Ptychoptera malaisei Alexander, 1946^{c g}
- Ptychoptera matongoensis Alexander, 1958^{c g}
- Ptychoptera metallica Walker, 1848^{i c g}
- Ptychoptera minor Alexander, 1920^{i c g}
- Ptychoptera minuta Tonnoir, 1919^{c g}
- Ptychoptera monoensis Alexander, 1947^{i c g}
- Ptychoptera obscura (Peus, 1958)^{c g}
- Ptychoptera osccola Alexander, 1959^{i g}
- Ptychoptera osceola Alexander, 1959^{c g}
- Ptychoptera pallidicostalis Nakamura & Saigusa, 2009^{c g}
- Ptychoptera paludosa Meigen, 1804^{c g}
- Ptychoptera pauliani Alexander, 1957^{c g}
- Ptychoptera pectinata Macquart, 1834^{c g}
- Ptychoptera pendula Alexander, 1937^{i c g}
- Ptychoptera perbona Alexander, 1946^{c g}
- Ptychoptera persimilis Alexander, 1947^{c g}
- Ptychoptera peusi Joost, 1974^{c g}
- Ptychoptera praescutellaris Alexander, 1946^{c g}
- Ptychoptera qinggouensis^{g}
- Ptychoptera quadrifasciata Say, 1824^{i c g b}
- Ptychoptera ressli Theischinger, 1978^{c g}
- Ptychoptera robinsoni Alexander, 1957^{c g}
- Ptychoptera sculleni Alexander, 1943^{i c g b}
- Ptychoptera scutellaris Meigen, 1818^{c g}
- Ptychoptera sikkimensis Alexander, 1965^{c g}
- Ptychoptera silvicola Zwyrtek & Rozkosny, 1967^{c g}
- Ptychoptera subscutellaris Alexander, 1921^{c g}
- Ptychoptera sumatrensis Alexander, 1936^{c g}
- Ptychoptera surcoufi (Seguy, 1925)^{c g}
- Ptychoptera takeuchii Tokunaga, 1938^{c g}
- Ptychoptera tibialis Brunetti, 1911^{c g}
- Ptychoptera townesi Alexander, 1943^{i c g b}
- Ptychoptera uelensis Alexander, 1928^{c g}
- Ptychoptera uta Alexander, 1947^{i c g}
- Ptychoptera wangae^{g}
- Ptychoptera yamato Nakamura & Saigusa, 2009^{c g}
- Ptychoptera yasumatsui Tokunaga, 1939^{c g}

Data sources: i = ITIS, c = Catalogue of Life, g = GBIF, b = Bugguide.net
