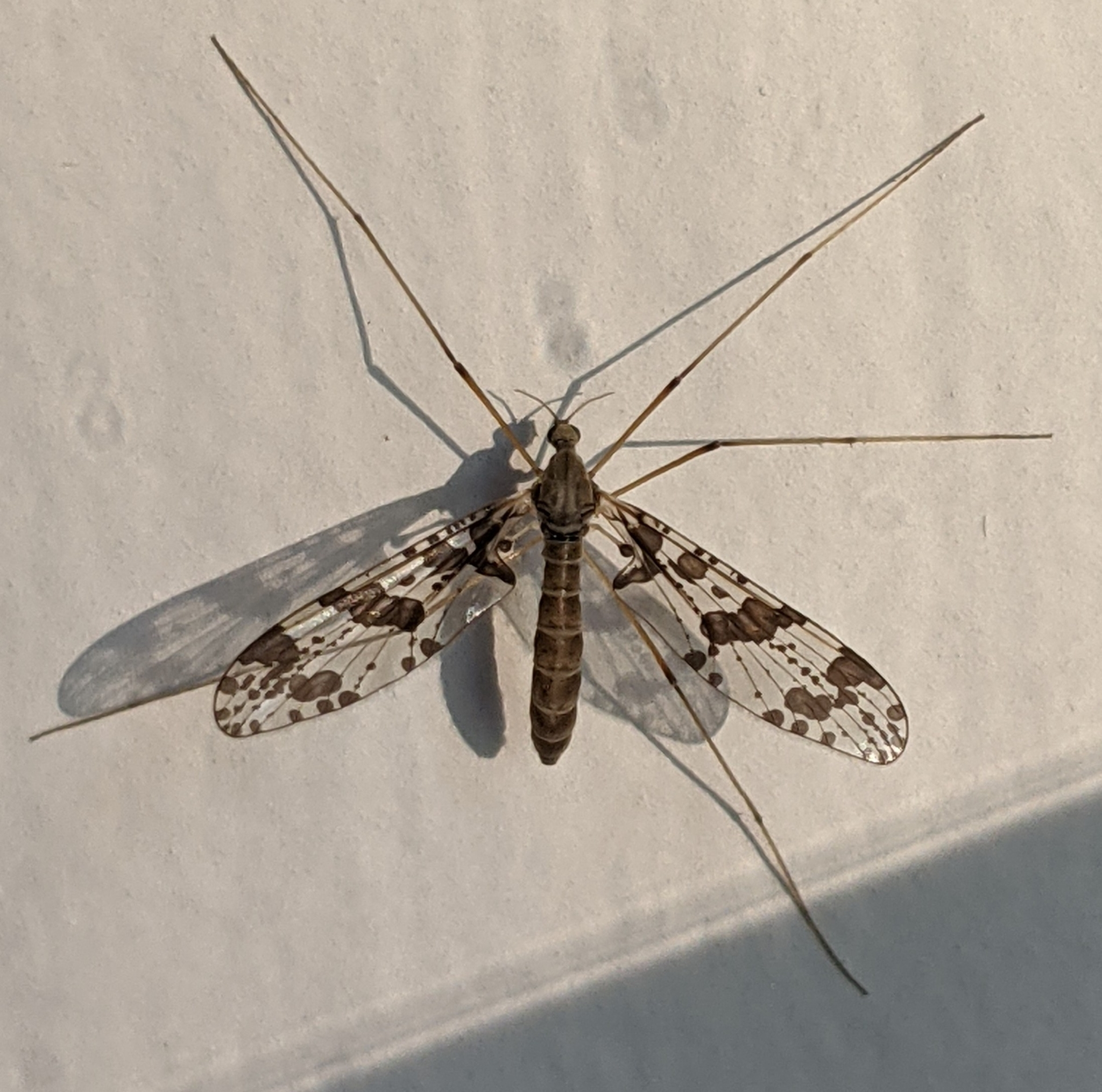
- Female Protanyderus margarita

Scientific classification
- Kingdom: Animalia
- Phylum: Arthropoda
- Clade: Pancrustacea
- Class: Insecta
- Order: Diptera
- Family: Tanyderidae
- Genus: Protanyderus; Handlirsch, 1909

Species
- See text

= Protanyderus =

Protanyderus Temporal range: Bajocian–Recent

Genus of flies

Protanyderus is a genus of crane flies in the family Tanyderidae

== Taxonomy ==
Protanyderus contains the following species:

- Protanyderus vanduzeei
- Protanyderus vipio
- Protanyderus alexanderi
- Protanyderus stackelbergi
- Protanyderus margarita
- Protanyderus esakii
