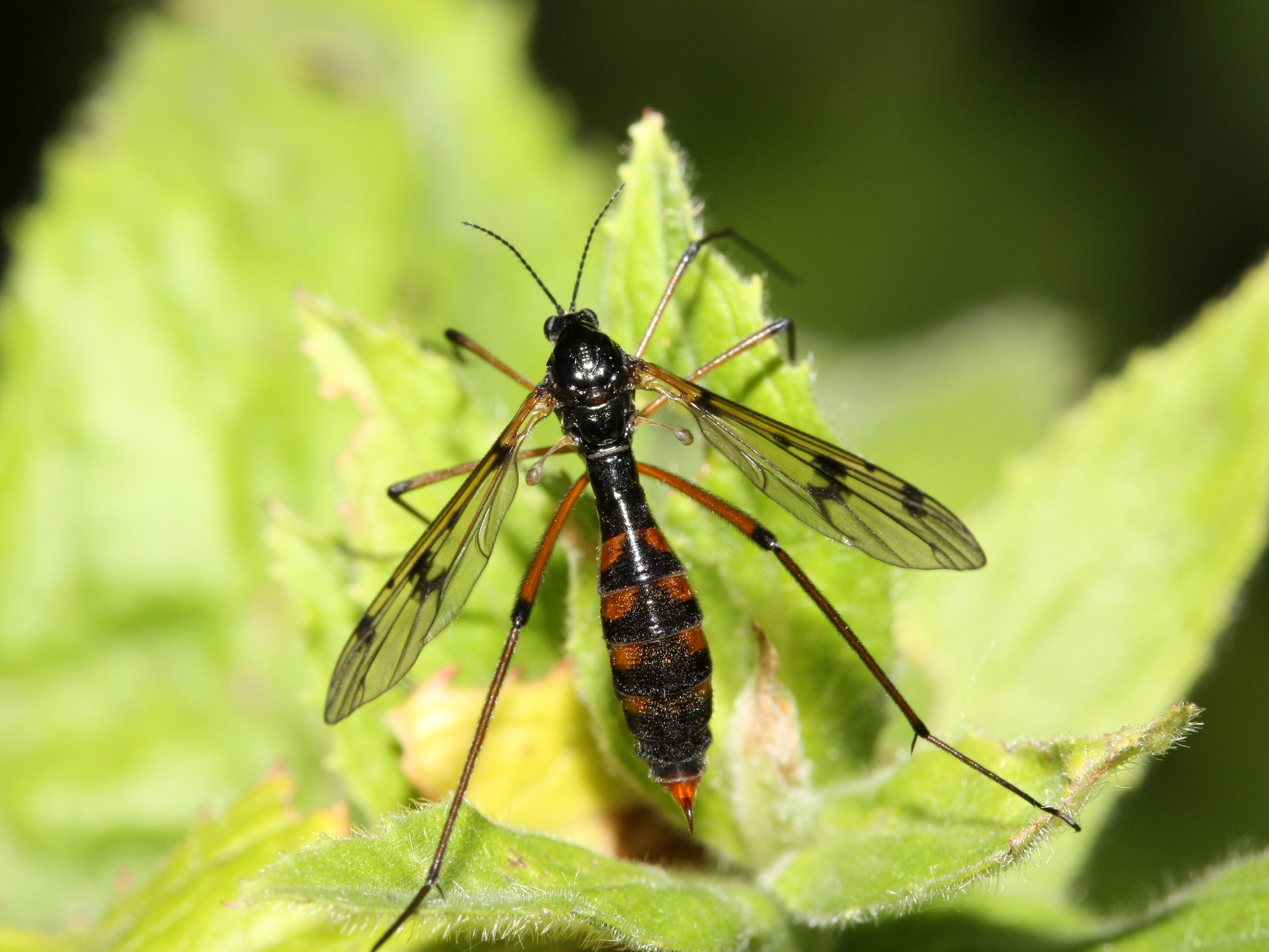
- Ptychoptera contaminata

Scientific classification
- Kingdom: Animalia
- Phylum: Arthropoda
- Class: Insecta
- Order: Diptera
- Suborder: Nematocera
- Infraorder: Ptychopteromorpha
- Family: Ptychopteridae; Osten-Sacken, 1862

Genera
- Ptychoptera; Bittacomorpha; Bittacomorphella

= Ptychopteridae =

Ptychopteridae Temporal range: Early Jurassic–Present

Family of flies

The Ptychopteridae, phantom crane flies, are a small family (three extant genera) of nematocerous Diptera. Superficially similar in appearance to other "tipuloid" families, they lack the ocelli of the Trichoceridae, the five-branched radial vein of the Tanyderidae, and the two anal veins that reach the wing margins of the Tipulidae. They are usually allied with the Tanyderidae based on similarities of the mesonotal suture, this group being called the Ptychopteromorpha.

== Life history ==
=== Egg ===
Ptychoptera albimana (Palearctic) has a mean of 554 eggs laid. The shape is slightly arcuated, "curiously ornamented", and roughly 0.8 mm × 0.2 mm (0.0315 in × 0.0079 in). Duration is reported at 7 days.

=== Larvae ===
The larvae are eucephalous and distinctive for the long, caudal respiratory siphon they possess. At hatching, they measure just under 4 mm (0.16 in) in P. albimana, quickly growing to nearly 80 mm (3.1 in). They occur in moist habitats (described as "wet swales and meadows" for Ptychoptera; along lentic shorelines and alder swamps for Bittacomorpha) where they feed as collector-gatherers on decaying organic matter.

=== Pupae ===
The pupae possess a single, greatly elongated spiracular horn protruding from their thoraces. In Ptychoptera and Bittacomorpha, the right horn is elongated; in Bittacomorphella, the left. Reported times spent in this stage vary from 5 to 12 days.

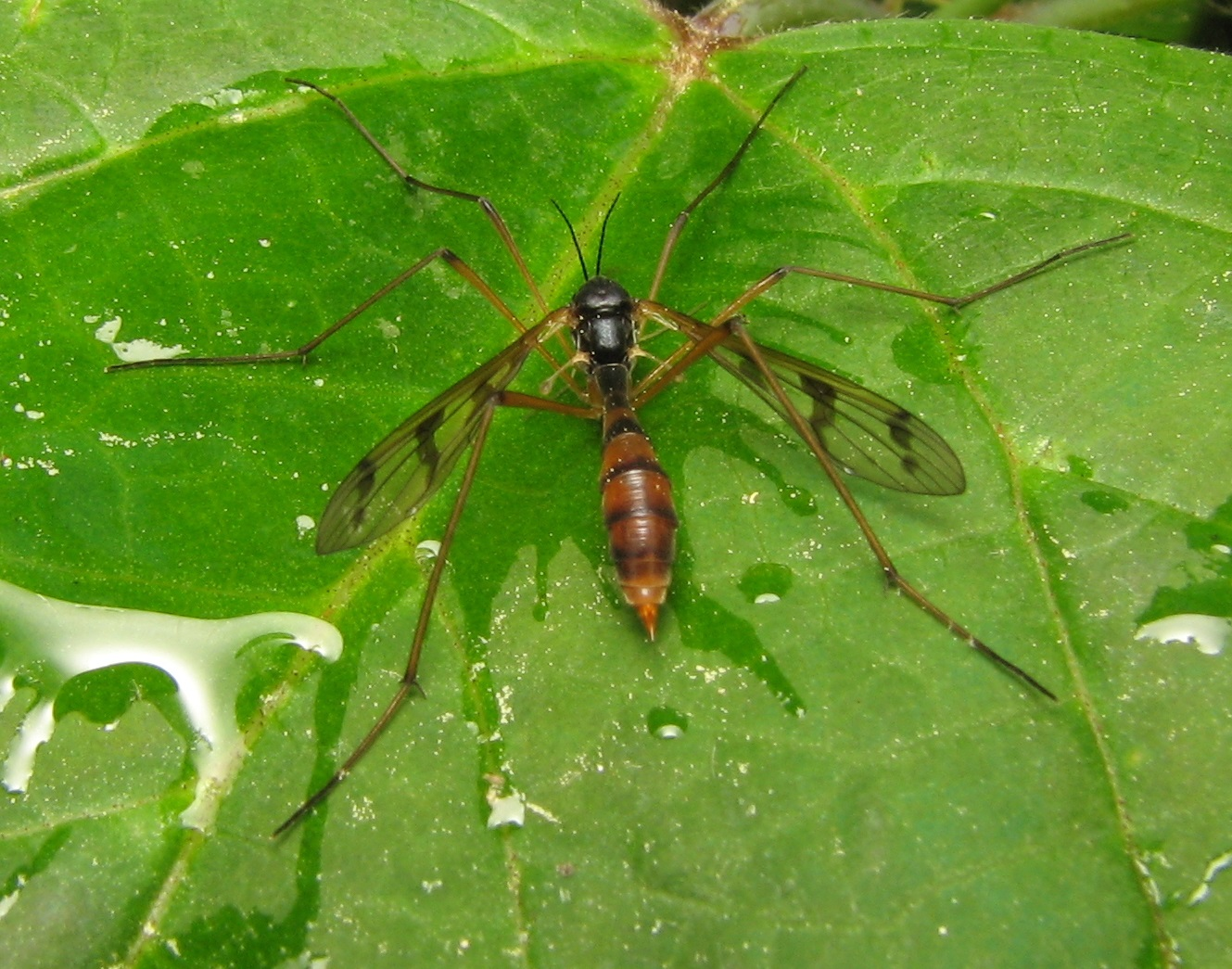
Ptychoptera quadrifasciata

=== Adult ===
The characteristic and unique feature of the family is a lobe at the base of the haltere called the prehaltere. The adults are found most often from late spring through to autumn in shaded, moist environs. Presumably, adults feed little, if at all. Two generations occur per year.

The common species of Eastern North America (Bittacomorpha clavipes) is known for the odd habit of spreading out its legs while flying, using expanded, trachea-rich tarsi to waft along on air currents.

Why they are called “phantom” crane flies: Their legs are thin and black with white sheaths near the tips, and when they fly under a shady tree, everything disappears except the white spots, appearing and disappearing like a “phantom”.

== Evolution and relationships ==
The family Ptychopteridae is generally regarded as one of the most basal or primitive groups within the order Diptera, retaining several ancestral features shared with early fly lineages. Despite their apparent antiquity, their precise relationships within the nematocerous flies remain unresolved. Morphological similarities link them to the Tanyderidae, and together these families are sometimes grouped as the Ptychopteromorpha. However, molecular and anatomical studies have yet to confirm whether this association represents a true evolutionary relationship or a convergence of structural traits.

Ptychopterids provide important insight into early dipteran evolution, preserving features that bridge the transition between primitive aquatic forms and the more derived higher flies. Their characteristic larval morphology—particularly the elongated respiratory siphon—and their simple adult structures may reflect an ecological continuity from ancestral aquatic dipterans.

== Subfamilies ==
The general appearance of the two forms is strikingly different. The species of the Bittacomorphinae are similar in size and shape to the Tipulidae, but exhibit a striking black and white coloration — hence the common name "phantom crane flies". The two genera differ as adults in their size and the extent of white coloration on the legs. The larvae of Bittacomorphella possess unique protuberances not seen in the other two genera. Ptychoptera species resemble large mycetophilids, being generally a shiny black and often with patterned wings.

Ptychopterinae – 16 antennomeres; M_{1} cell present

- Ptychoptera Meigen, 1803

Bittacomorphinae – 20 antennomeres; M_{1} & M_{2} veins fused, thus without M_{1} cell

- Bittacomorpha Westwood, 1835
- Bittacomorphella Alexander, 1916
- Bittacomorphinae
  - Bittacomorpha Westwood, 1835
    - Bittacomorpha clavipes Fabricius, 1781 - Eastern NA to the edge of the Rocky Mountains (though not as abundant in the Plains states)
    - Bittacomorpha occidentalis Aldrich, 1895 - Pacific Northwest
  - Bittacomorphella Alexander, 1916
    - Bittacomorphella jonesi Johnson, 1905 - New England down to North Carolina, west to Minnesota and Michigan
    - Bittacomorphella esakii Tokunaga, 1938 - Japan
    - Bittacomorphella fenderiana Alexander, 1947 - Queen Charlotte Island down to Northern Oregon.
    - Bittacomorphella nipponensis Alexander, 1924 -
    - Bittacomorphella pacifica Alexander, 1958 - Northern California up through Oregon (possibly Washington?)
    - Bittacomorphella sackenii Röder, 1890 - Sierra Nevadas
    - Bittacomorphella thaiensis Alexander, 1953 -
- Ptychopterinae
  - Ptychoptera Meigen 1803
    - Ptychoptera byersi Alexander, 1966 - California
    - Ptychoptera lenis Osten Sacken, 1877
      - P. l. lenis - Pacific Northwest
      - P. l. coloradensis - Colorado/Utah
    - Ptychoptera metallica Walker, 1848 - Central Canada, Minnesota & Michigan
    - Ptychoptera minor Alexander, 1920 - California/Idaho
    - Ptychoptera monoensis Alexander, 1947 - Northern California
    - Ptychoptera osceola Alexander, 1959 - Florida
    - Ptychoptera pendula Alexander, 1937 - British Columbia to Utah & Colorado
    - Ptychoptera quadrifasciata Say, 1824 - Eastern North America (Syn P. rufocinctus)
    - Ptychoptera sculleni Alexander, 1943 - Pacific Northwest
    - Ptychoptera townesi Alexander, 1943 - Washington & Oregon
    - Ptychoptera uta Alexander, 1947 - Utah

=== Fossil Subfamilies and genera ===
- Subfamily Bittacomorphinae Alexander, 1919
  - †Probittacomorpha Freiwald & Willmann, 1992
    - †Probittacomorpha brisaci Krzemiński et al., 2012 - Montagne d'Andance Miocene (Turolian), France
    - †Probittacomorpha christenseni Freiwald & Willmann, 1992 - Fur Formation Eocene (Ypresian), Denmark;
  - †Zhiganka Lukashevich, 1995
    - †Zhiganka comitans Lukashevich, 1995 - Batylykh Formation Early Cretaceous (Neocomian), Russia
    - †Zhiganka longialata Lukashevich, 2019 - Khasurty locality Early Cretaceous (Aptian), Russia
    - †Zhiganka woolgari Lukashevich et al., 2001 - Weald Clay Early Cretaceous (Hauterivian), England
- Subfamily. †Eoptychopterinae Handlirsch 1906
  - †Architendipes Rohdendorf 1962
    - †Architendipes tshernovskiji Rohdendorf, 1962 - Dzhil Formation Early Jurassic (Hettangian), Kyrgyzstan
  - †Doptychoptera Lukashevich, 1998
    - †Doptychoptera baisicaLukashevich, 1998 - Zaza Formation Early Cretaceous (Aptian), Russia
  - †Eolimnobia Handlirsch, 1906
    - †Eolimnobia geinitzi Handlirsch, 1906 - Grimmen Formation Early Jurassic (Toarcian), Germany
  - †Eoptychoptera Handlirsch 1906
    - †Eoptychoptera aequidistans Lukashevich, 1998 - Dzhil Formation Early Jurassic (Hettangian), Kyrgyzstan
    - †Eoptychoptera altaica Kalugina, 1988 - Ortsog Formation Middle Jurassic (Bajocian), Mongolia
    - †Eoptychoptera ansorgei Ren & Krzemiński, 2002 - Daohugou Formation Middle Jurassic (Callovian), China
    - †Eoptychoptera asiatica Lukashevich, 1993 - Karabastau Formation Late Jurassic, Kazakhstan
    - †Eoptychoptera aucta Lukashevich, 1993 - Karabastau Formation Late Jurassic, Kazakhstan
    - †Eoptychoptera braziliana Krzemiński et al., 2015 - Crato Formation Early Cretaceous (Aptian), Brazil
    - †Eoptychoptera britannica Lukashevich et al., 2001 - Weald Clay Early Cretaceous (Hauterivian), England
    - †Eoptychoptera cantabrica Lukashevich & Arillo, 2016 - Spanish amber (Albian), Spain
    - †Eoptychoptera cretacea Kalugina, 1989 - Zaza Formation Early Cretaceous (Aptian), Russia
    - †Eoptychoptera elevata Lukashevich, 2000 - Khaya Formation Late Jurassic (Tithonian), Russia
    - †Eoptychoptera eximia Bode, 1953 - Ciechocinek Formation Early Jurassic (Toarcian), Germany
    - †Eoptychoptera jurassica Ren & Krzemiński, 2002 - Daohugou Formation Middle Jurassic (Callovian), China
    - †Eoptychoptera longifurcata Lukashevich et al., 2001 - Lulworth Formation Early Cretaceous (Berriasian), England
    - †Eoptychoptera magna Lukashevich, 1993 - Karabastau Formation Late Jurassic, Kazakhstan
    - †Eoptychoptera maxima Kalugina, 1985 - Itat Formation Middle Jurassic (Bathonian), Russia
    - †Eoptychoptera modica Lukashevich, 1993 - Itat Formation (Middle Jurassic (Bathonian), Russia
    - †Eoptychoptera paramaculata Kalugina, 1985 - Itat Formation (Middle Jurassic (Bathonian), Russia
    - †Eoptychoptera shurabica Lukashevich, 2000 - Sagul Formation Early Jurassic (Toarcian), Kyrgyzstan
    - †Eoptychoptera simplex Handlirsch, 1906 - Ciechocinek Formation Early Jurassic (Toarcian), Germany
    - †Eoptychoptera spectra Whalley, 1985 - Charmouth Mudstone Formation (Sinemurian), United Kingdom
    - †Eoptychoptera tempestilla Lukashevich, 1998 - Ulan Malgait Formation Late Jurassic (Tithonian), Mongolia
    - †Eoptychoptera vitrea Lukashevich, 1998 - Dzhil Formation Early Jurassic (Hettangian), Kyrgyzstan
  - †Eoptychopterina Kalugina 1985
    - †Eoptychopterina adnexa Hao et al. 2009 - Daohugou Formation Middle Jurassic (Callovian), China
    - †Eoptychopterina angularis Lukashevich, 1993 - Karabastau Formation Late Jurassic, Kazakhstan
    - †Eoptychopterina antica Hao et al. 2009 - Daohugou Formation Middle Jurassic (Callovian), China
    - †Eoptychopterina baisica Kalugina, 1989 - Zaza Formation Early Cretaceous (Aptian), Russia
    - †Eoptychopterina camura Lukashevich et al., 2001 - Weald Clay Early Cretaceous (Hauterivian), United Kingdom
    - †Eoptychopterina daiensis Kalugina, 1989 - Glushkovo Formation Late Jurassic (Tithonian), Russia
    - †Eoptychopterina demissa Lukashevich et al., 2001 - Durlston Formation Early Cretaceous (Berriasian), United Kingdom
    - †Eoptychopterina dimidiata Lukashevich et al., 2001 - Durlston Formation Early Cretaceous (Berriasian), United Kingdom
    - †Eoptychopterina elenae Ren & Krzemiński 2002 - Daohugou Formation Middle Jurassic (Callovian), China
    - †Eoptychopterina glabra Lukashevich, 1993 - Itat Formation Middle Jurassic (Bathonian), Russia
    - †Eoptychopterina kaluginae Lukashevich, 2004 - Ulan Malgait Formation Late Jurassic (Tithonian), Mongolia
    - †Eoptychopterina karatavica Lukashevich, 1993 - Karabastau Formation Late Jurassic, Kazakhstan
    - †Eoptychopterina mediata Hao et al. 2009 - Daohugou Formation Middle Jurassic (Callovian), China
    - †Eoptychopterina omissa Lukashevich, 2004 - Karabastau Formation Late Jurassic, Kazakhstan
    - †Eoptychopterina petri Lukashevich, 2004 - Glushkovo Formation Late Jurassic (Tithonian), Russia
    - †Eoptychopterina postica Liu et al. 2012 - Daohugou Formation Middle Jurassic (Callovian), China
    - †Eoptychopterina rohdendorphi Kalugina, 1985 - Ichetuy Formation Late Jurassic (Oxfordian), Russia
    - †Eoptychopterina transbaicalica Kalugina, 1985 - Uda Formation Late Jurassic (Oxfordian/Kimmeridgian), Russia
    - †Eoptychopterina undensis Kalugina, 1989 - Glushkovo Formation Late Jurassic (Tithonian), Russia
  - †Leptychoptera Lukashevich & Azar 2003
    - †Leptychoptera subgenus (Burmaptychoptera) Lukashevich, 2004
      - †Leptychoptera (Burmaptychoptera) calva Lukashevich, 2004 - Burmese amber Mid Cretaceous (latest Albian-earliest Cenomanian), Myanmar
      - †Leptychoptera (Burmaptychoptera) reburra Lukashevich, 2004 - Burmese amber Mid Cretaceous (latest Albian-earliest Cenomanian), Myanmar
    - †Leptychoptera subgenus (Leptychoptera) Lukashevich & Azar, 2003
      - †Leptychoptera (Leptychoptera) dimkina Lukashevich & Azar, 2003 - Lebanese amber Early Cretaceous (Barremian) Lebanon
      - †Leptychoptera (Leptychoptera) vovkina Lukashevich & Azar, 2003 - Lebanese amber Early Cretaceous (Barremian) Lebanon
  - †Nedoptychoptera Lukashevich 1998
    - †Nedoptychoptera karatavica - Karabastau Formation Late Jurassic, Kazakhstan
  - †Neuseptychoptera Szadziewski et al. 2017
    - †Neuseptychoptera carolinensis - Neuse River amber Late Cretaceous (Campanian), North Carolina,
- †subfamily Proptychopterininae Lukashevich, 1995
  - †Proptychopterina Kalugina, 1985
    - †Proptychopterina amota Lukashevich, 1993 - Itat Formation Middle Jurassic (Bathonian) Russia
    - †Proptychopterina evecta Lukashevich, 1993 - Karabastau Formation Late Jurassic Kazakhstan
    - †Proptychopterina gracilis Lukashevich, 1993 - Karabastau Formation Late Jurassic Kazakhstan
    - †Proptychopterina handlirschi Kalugina, 1985 - Itat Formation Middle Jurassic (Bathonian) Russia
    - †Proptychopterina immensa Lukashevich, 2000 - Khaya Formation Late Jurassic (Tithonian), Russia
    - †Proptychopterina makarova Lukashevich, 2000 - Makarova Formation Early Jurassic (Toarcian), Russia
    - †Proptychopterina mongolica Kalugina, 1988 - Ulaan-Ereg Formation Late Jurassic (Tithonian), Mongolia
    - †Proptychopterina oleynikovi Kalugina, 1989 - Glushkovo Formation Late Jurassic (Tithonian), Russia
    - †Proptychopterina opinata Lin & Lukashevich, 2006 -Daohugou Formation Middle Jurassic (Callovian), China
    - †Proptychopterina sharategica Kalugina, 1992 - Ulan Malgait Formation Late Jurassic (Tithonian), Mongolia
    - †Proptychopterina tenera Lukashevich, 2000 - Khaya Formation Late Jurassic (Tithonian), Russia
    - †Proptychopterina yeniseica Lukashevich, 1993 - Itat Formation Middle Jurassic (Bathonian) Russia
- Subfamily Ptychopterinae Schiner 1864
  - †Brodilka Lukashevich et al. 2001
    - †Brodilka mitchelli Lukashevich et al. 2001 - Lulworth Formation Early Cretaceous (Berriasian) United Kingdom
  - Ptychoptera Meigen, 1803
    - †Ptychoptera deleta Novák, 1878 - Cypris Formation (Miocene), Czech Republic
    - †Ptychoptera eocenica Podenas, 2007 - Baltic amber (Priabonian), Russia
    - †Ptychoptera mesozoica Kalugina, 1989 - Zaza Formation Early Cretaceous (Aptian), Russia
    - †Ptychoptera miocenica Cockerell, 1910 - Florissant Formation (Priabonian), Colorado
  - †Sinoptychopterites Hong, 2002
    - †Sinoptychopterites paludus Hong, 2002 - Fushin amber (Ypresian), China
- Subfamily incertae sedis
  - †Bolboia Kalugina, 1989
    - †Bolboia mira Kalugina, 1989 - Byankino Formation Late Jurassic (Tithonian), Russia
  - †Crenoptychoptera Kalugina, 1985
    - †Crenoptychoptera antica Kalugina, 1985 - Itat Formation Middle Jurassic (Bathonian) Russia
    - †Crenoptychoptera bavarica Krzemiński & Ansorge, 1995 - Solnhofen Formation Late Jurassic (Tithonian), Germany
    - †Crenoptychoptera conspecta Lukashevich, 1995 - Cheremkhovskaya Formation, Early Jurassic (Toarcian), Russia
    - †Crenoptychoptera decorosa Hao et al. 2009 - Daohugou Formation Middle Jurassic (Callovian), China
    - †Crenoptychoptera defossa Kalugina, 1985 - Itat Formation Middle Jurassic (Bathonian) Russia
    - †Crenoptychoptera dobbertinensis Ansorge, 1998 - Ciechocinek Formation Early Jurassic (Toarcian), Germany
    - †Crenoptychoptera gronskayae Kalugina, 1989 - Khaya Formation Late Jurassic (Tithonian), Russia
    - †Crenoptychoptera liturata Lukashevich, 2011 - Ulan Malgait Formation Late Jurassic (Tithonian), Mongolia
  - †Etoptychoptera Handlirsh 1910
    - †Etoptychoptera tertiaria Handlirsh 1910 - Allenby Formation (Ypresian), Canada
