= Bittacomorpha occidentalis =

Scientific classification
- Domain: Eukaryota
- Kingdom: Animalia
- Phylum: Arthropoda
- Class: Insecta
- Order: Diptera
- Family: Ptychopteridae
- Genus: Bittacomorpha
- Species: B. occidentalis

Binomial name
- Bittacomorpha occidentalis Aldrich, 1895

Species of fly

Bittacomorpha occidentalis is a species of phantom crane flies in the family Ptychopteridae.
