= Isolitaphididae =

Scientific classification
- Domain: Eukaryota
- Kingdom: Animalia
- Phylum: Arthropoda
- Class: Insecta
- Order: Hemiptera
- Suborder: Sternorrhyncha
- Infraorder: Aphidomorpha
- Superfamily: †Palaeoaphidoidea
- Family: †Isolitaphididae; Poinar, 2017

Extinct family of true bugs

Isolitaphididae is an extinct family of aphids in the order Hemiptera. There are at least three genera in Isolitaphididae.

== Genera ==
These three genera belong to the family Isolitaphididae:

- † Hormatalis Wegierek & Wang, 2018
- † Isolitaphis Poinar, 2017
- † Prolavexillaphis Liu, Qiao & Yao, 2017
