= Bittacomorphella jonesi =

Scientific classification
- Domain: Eukaryota
- Kingdom: Animalia
- Phylum: Arthropoda
- Class: Insecta
- Order: Diptera
- Family: Ptychopteridae
- Genus: Bittacomorphella
- Species: B. jonesi

Binomial name
- Bittacomorphella jonesi (Johnson, 1905)

Synonyms
- Bittacomorpha jonesi Johnson, 1905

Species of fly

Bittacomorphella jonesi, the pygmy phantom crane fly, is a species of phantom crane fly in the family Ptychopteridae.
