= Cretorabus =

Scientific classification
- Kingdom: Animalia
- Phylum: Arthropoda
- Class: Insecta
- Order: Coleoptera
- Suborder: Adephaga
- Family: Carabidae
- Genus: †Cretorabus

Type species
- Cretorabus capitatus Ponomarenko 1977

Genus of ground beetle

Cretoabus is a genus of ground beetle (Carabidae) that lived during the Lower Cretaceous epoch in the Cretaceous period inside modern day Inner Mongolia, China. This genus contains several species such as Cretorabus capitatus, Cretorabus latus, Cretorabus medius, Cretobus orientalis, Cetorbus ovalis, Cretorabus rasnitsyni and Cretorabus sulcatus.
