= A. femoralis =

A. femoralis may refer to:

- Abacetus femoralis, a ground beetle
- Aciura femoralis, a synonym of Aciura coryli, a fruit fly found in Europe
- Agamura femoralis, a synonym of Rhinogekko femoralis, a gecko found in Pakistan and Iran
- Ahrensia femoralis, a synonym of Microsoma exiguum, a tachinid fly found in Europe and Asia
- Allobates femoralis, the brilliant-thighed poison frog, found in South America
- Arizelopsar femoralis, Abbott's starling, a bird found in Kenya and Tanzania
- Atherix femoralis, a synonym of Atherix ibis, the yellow-legged water-snipefly, an ibis fly found in Europe and the Palearctic
- Aulicus femoralis, a checkered beetle found in North America
