= Euoestrophasia aperta =

Scientific classification
- Kingdom: Animalia
- Phylum: Arthropoda
- Class: Insecta
- Order: Diptera
- Family: Tachinidae
- Subfamily: Dexiinae
- Tribe: Dufouriini
- Genus: Euoestrophasia
- Species: E. aperta

Binomial name
- Euoestrophasia aperta (Brauer & von Berganstamm, 1889)

Synonyms
- Oestrophasia aperta Brauer & von Berganstamm, 1889

Species of fly

Euoestrophasia aperta is a species of fly in the family Tachinidae.

== Distribution ==
Argentina, Brazil, Uruguay.
