= Comyops nigripennis =

Scientific classification
- Kingdom: Animalia
- Phylum: Arthropoda
- Class: Insecta
- Order: Diptera
- Family: Tachinidae
- Subfamily: Dexiinae
- Tribe: Dufouriini
- Genus: Comyops
- Species: C. nigripennis

Binomial name
- Comyops nigripennis Wulp, 1891

Species of fly

Comyops nigripennis is a species of fly in the family Tachinidae.

== Distribution ==
Mexico, Trinidad and Tobago.
