= Oestrophasia clausa =

Scientific classification
- Kingdom: Animalia
- Phylum: Arthropoda
- Class: Insecta
- Order: Diptera
- Family: Tachinidae
- Subfamily: Dexiinae
- Tribe: Dufouriini
- Genus: Oestrophasia
- Species: O. clausa

Binomial name
- Oestrophasia clausa Brauer & von Berganstamm, 1889

Synonyms
- Oestrophasia setosa Coquillett, 1902

Species of fly

Oestrophasia clausa is a species of bristle fly in the family Tachinidae.

== Distribution ==
Canada, United States.
