= Atherix variegata =

Scientific classification
- Kingdom: Animalia
- Phylum: Arthropoda
- Class: Insecta
- Order: Diptera
- Family: Athericidae
- Subfamily: Athericinae
- Genus: Atherix
- Species: A. variegata

Binomial name
- Atherix variegata Walker, 1848

Species of fly

Atherix variegata is a species of watersnipe fly in the family Athericidae. It is found in Canada and the United States.
