= Rondania cucullata =

Scientific classification
- Kingdom: Animalia
- Phylum: Arthropoda
- Class: Insecta
- Order: Diptera
- Family: Tachinidae
- Subfamily: Dexiinae
- Tribe: Dufouriini
- Genus: Rondania
- Species: R. cucullata

Binomial name
- Rondania cucullata Robineau-Desvoidy, 1850

Synonyms
- Dysthrixa notiventris Pandellé, 1896; Rondania notata Robineau-Desvoidy, 1863; Xysta rufitibia Strobl, 1894

Species of fly

Rondania cucullata is a species of fly in the family Tachinidae.

== Distribution ==
Czech Republic, Hungary, Poland, Slovakia, Croatia, Italy, Austria, France, Germany, Netherlands, Switzerland, Russia, China.
