= Atherix pachypus =

Scientific classification
- Kingdom: Animalia
- Phylum: Arthropoda
- Class: Insecta
- Order: Diptera
- Family: Athericidae
- Subfamily: Athericinae
- Genus: Atherix
- Species: A. pachypus

Binomial name
- Atherix pachypus Bigot, 1887

Species of fly

Atherix pachypus is a species of watersnipe fly in the family Athericidae.

== Distribution ==
United States.
