= Chetoptilia puella =

Scientific classification
- Kingdom: Animalia
- Phylum: Arthropoda
- Class: Insecta
- Order: Diptera
- Family: Tachinidae
- Subfamily: Dexiinae
- Tribe: Dufouriini
- Genus: Chetoptilia
- Species: C. puella

Binomial name
- Chetoptilia puella (Rondani, 1862)

Synonyms
- Ptilops puella Rondani, 1862

Species of fly

Chetoptilia puella is a species of fly in the family Tachinidae.

== Distribution ==
Czech Republic, Hungary, Poland, Sweden, Bulgaria, Italy, France, Germany, Switzerland, Russia, Georgia.
