= Oestrophasia calva =

Scientific classification
- Kingdom: Animalia
- Phylum: Arthropoda
- Clade: Pancrustacea
- Class: Insecta
- Order: Diptera
- Family: Tachinidae
- Subfamily: Dexiinae
- Tribe: Dufouriini
- Genus: Oestrophasia
- Species: O. calva

Binomial name
- Oestrophasia calva Coquillett, 1902

Species of fly

Oestrophasia calva is a species of fly in the family Tachinidae.

== Distribution ==
Canada, United States, Mexico.
