= Rondania fasciata =

Scientific classification
- Kingdom: Animalia
- Phylum: Arthropoda
- Class: Insecta
- Order: Diptera
- Family: Tachinidae
- Subfamily: Dexiinae
- Tribe: Dufouriini
- Genus: Rondania
- Species: R. fasciata

Binomial name
- Rondania fasciata (Macquart, 1834)

Synonyms
- Hyalomyia fasciata Macquart, 1834; Phasia fasciola Zetterstedt, 1838; Phasia zonella Zetterstedt, 1838

Species of fly

Rondania fasciata is a species of fly in the family Tachinidae.

== Distribution ==
British Isles, Belarus, Czech Republic, Hungary, Lithuania, Poland, Romania, Slovakia, Ukraine, Denmark, Finland, Norway, Sweden, Andorra, Greece, Italy, Spain, Austria, France, Germany, Netherlands, Switzerland, Russia.
