= Microsoma vicinum =

Scientific classification
- Kingdom: Animalia
- Phylum: Arthropoda
- Class: Insecta
- Order: Diptera
- Family: Tachinidae
- Subfamily: Dexiinae
- Tribe: Dufouriini
- Genus: Microsoma
- Species: M. vicinum

Binomial name
- Microsoma vicinum (Mesnil, 1970)

Synonyms
- Campogaster vicina Mesnil, 1970

Species of fly

Microsoma vicinum is a species of fly in the family Tachinidae.

== Distribution ==
Japan, Russia.
