= Eugymnopeza braueri =

Scientific classification
- Kingdom: Animalia
- Phylum: Arthropoda
- Clade: Pancrustacea
- Class: Insecta
- Order: Diptera
- Family: Tachinidae
- Subfamily: Dexiinae
- Tribe: Dufouriini
- Genus: Eugymnopeza
- Species: E. braueri

Binomial name
- Eugymnopeza braueri Townsend, 1933

Species of fly

Eugymnopeza braueri is a fly species in the family Tachinidae.

== Distribution ==
Hungary, Romania, Italy, Austria, Azerbaijan.
