= Chetoptilia burmanica =

Scientific classification
- Kingdom: Animalia
- Phylum: Arthropoda
- Class: Insecta
- Order: Diptera
- Family: Tachinidae
- Subfamily: Dexiinae
- Tribe: Dufouriini
- Genus: Chetoptilia
- Species: C. burmanica

Binomial name
- Chetoptilia burmanica (Baranov, 1938)

Synonyms
- Chaetoptiliopsis burmanica Baranov, 1938

Species of fly

Chetoptilia burmanica is a species of fly in the family Tachinidae.

== Distribution ==
Myanmar, China.
