= Ebenia claripennis =

Scientific classification
- Kingdom: Animalia
- Phylum: Arthropoda
- Class: Insecta
- Order: Diptera
- Family: Tachinidae
- Subfamily: Dexiinae
- Tribe: Dufouriini
- Genus: Ebenia
- Species: E. claripennis

Binomial name
- Ebenia claripennis Macquart, 1846

Species of fly

Ebenia claripennis is a species of fly in the family Tachinidae. Pupae has been found within an unidentified Hispinae beetle specimen, likely the host of E. claripennis.

== Distribution ==
Trinidad and Tobago, Brazil.
