= Atrichops crassipes =

Scientific classification
- Kingdom: Animalia
- Phylum: Arthropoda
- Clade: Pancrustacea
- Class: Insecta
- Order: Diptera
- Family: Athericidae
- Subfamily: Athericinae
- Genus: Atrichops
- Species: A. crassipes

Binomial name
- Atrichops crassipes Meigen, 1820

Synonyms
- Atherix crassipes Meigen, 1820

Species of fly

Atrichops crassipes is a species of watersnipe fly in the family Athericidae.

== Description ==
The thorax is shining black in male, more brownish with black stripes in female. The wing has vague clouds and a prominent stigma. The radial fork is elongateLength 6 mm Legs elongate and slender, hind tarsi a little in flated in both sexes.The abdomen is elongate-cylindrical, with yellow-brown and black bands, more yellowish towards base, especially in male. Legs elongate and slender, hind tarsi a little in flated in both sexes.Length 6 mm It resembles the fly Sylvicola or a small ichneumon, for which it could easily be mistaken. Image

== Distribution ==
Europe.
