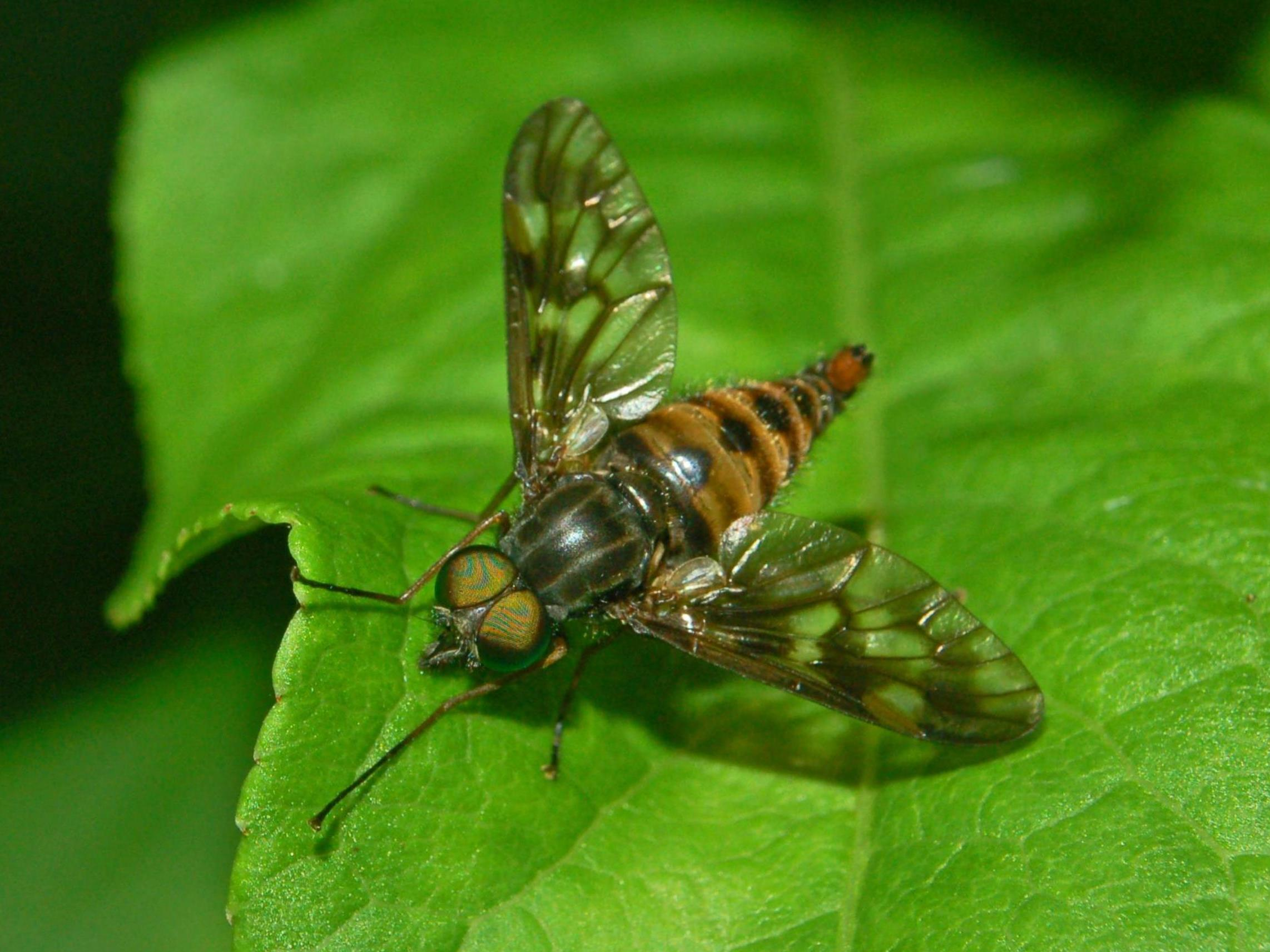
- Male

Scientific classification
- Kingdom: Animalia
- Phylum: Arthropoda
- Class: Insecta
- Order: Diptera
- Family: Athericidae
- Subfamily: Athericinae
- Genus: Atherix
- Species: A. ibis

Binomial name
- Atherix ibis (Fabricius, 1798)

Synonyms
- Rhagio ibis Fabricius, 1798; Anthrax titanus Fabricius, 1798; Atherix femoralis Loew, 1869; Atherix japonica Nagatomi, 1958; Atherix maculata Meigen, 1804; Atherix trifasciata Roser, 1840; Musca atherix Donovan, 1813

= Atherix ibis =

Species of fly

Atherix ibis, the yellow-legged water-snipefly, is a species of ibis flies belonging to the family Athericidae, a small family very similar to Rhagionidae (Snipe Flies).

== Distribution and habitat ==
This species is present in most of Europe and in the Palearctic realm up to Japan. These flies inhabit rivers with a clean and gentle to fast-flowing current.

== Description ==
Atherix ibis can reach a length of 9–11 millimetres (0.35–0.43 in). These flies have a broad-built and slightly hairy body. The thorax is black and has two gray, narrow longitudinal stripes and a gray lateral band. In the male the abdomen is orange-brown with black markings, The female has a black abdomen with gray margins. The wings are large and strongly patterned, with dark brown veins. The legs are slim and yellow-brown colored. At the head there are the short, thick proboscis as well as the green compound eyes. Females of this species are very similar to Atherix marginata, but the latter has entirely black legs.

The larvae of these flies are greenish-brown and reach a length of up to 20 millimeters. They have seven pairs of abdominal prolegs on the last segment.

== Biology ==
Adults can be found from May to July. Oviposition begins in early June. The females, after mating, aggregate in large clumps and lay egg masses on tree branches overhanging rivers or under bridges over flowing waters. After a female has started laying eggs, the others follow soon. In such a way the first stage larvae will fall into the water, where they will start their life cycle.

After oviposition, the females die, causing lumps of thousands of dead flies and their eggs. The larvae are predators. In fact a few days after oviposition, the larvae hatch and at first feed on the dead parents. Later, they fall into the water and feed on carrion, detritus and small invertebrates such as stoneflies, mayflies and caddisflies. They usually kill their preys with a venomous bite. The larvae occur mainly in clean, moderate to fast-flowing waters with stony or gravelly ground. Whether the adult flies are predators, feed on nectar or whether they are bloodsucking, it is not completely clear.

== Bibliography ==
- A. Minelli – La fauna in Italia – Touring Editore
- Di Paul S. Giller, Björn Malmqvist - The biology of streams and rivers – Oxford University Press
- Heiko Bellmann: Leben im Bach und Teich. Mosaik-Verlag, München 1998.
- Stubbs, A. and Drake, M - British Soldierflies and Their Allies: A Field Guide to the Larger British Brachycera, pp. 512 - British Entomological & Natural History Society
- Wesenberg-Lund: Biologie der Süßwasserinsekten, S. 550–552, Nordisk Forlag, Kopenhagen 1943
