= Rondania rubens =

Scientific classification
- Kingdom: Animalia
- Phylum: Arthropoda
- Class: Insecta
- Order: Diptera
- Family: Tachinidae
- Subfamily: Dexiinae
- Tribe: Dufouriini
- Genus: Rondania
- Species: R. rubens

Binomial name
- Rondania rubens Herting, 1969

Species of fly

Rondania rubens is a species of fly in the family Tachinidae.

== Distribution ==
Andorra, Italy, Portugal, Spain.
