= Oestrophasia uncana =

Scientific classification
- Kingdom: Animalia
- Phylum: Arthropoda
- Class: Insecta
- Order: Diptera
- Family: Tachinidae
- Subfamily: Dexiinae
- Tribe: Dufouriini
- Genus: Oestrophasia
- Species: O. uncana

Binomial name
- Oestrophasia uncana (Fabricius, 1805)

Synonyms
- Dictya uncana Fabricius, 1805

Species of fly

Oestrophasia uncana is a species of fly in the family Tachinidae.

== Distribution ==
Brazil.
