= Oestrophasia signifera =

Scientific classification
- Kingdom: Animalia
- Phylum: Arthropoda
- Class: Insecta
- Order: Diptera
- Family: Tachinidae
- Subfamily: Dexiinae
- Tribe: Dufouriini
- Genus: Oestrophasia
- Species: O. signifera

Binomial name
- Oestrophasia signifera (Wulp, 1890)

Species of fly

Oestrophasia signifera is a species of fly in the family Tachinidae.

== Distribution ==
Canada, United States Mexico, Trinidad and Tobago, Costa Rica.
