= Euoestrophasia townsendi =

Scientific classification
- Kingdom: Animalia
- Phylum: Arthropoda
- Class: Insecta
- Order: Diptera
- Family: Tachinidae
- Subfamily: Dexiinae
- Tribe: Dufouriini
- Genus: Euoestrophasia
- Species: E. townsendi

Binomial name
- Euoestrophasia townsendi Guimarães, 1977

Species of fly

Euoestrophasia townsendi is a species of fly in the family Tachinidae.

== Distribution ==
Brazil.
