= Atherix lantha =

Scientific classification
- Kingdom: Animalia
- Phylum: Arthropoda
- Class: Insecta
- Order: Diptera
- Family: Athericidae
- Subfamily: Athericinae
- Genus: Atherix
- Species: A. lantha

Binomial name
- Atherix lantha Webb, 1977

Species of fly

Atherix lantha is a species of watersnipe fly in the family Athericidae.

== Distribution ==
Canada, United States.
