= Jamacaria =

Scientific classification
- Kingdom: Animalia
- Phylum: Arthropoda
- Class: Insecta
- Order: Diptera
- Family: Tachinidae
- Subfamily: Dexiinae
- Tribe: Dufouriini
- Genus: Jamacaria; Curran, 1928

Type species
- Jamacaria albofenestrata Curran, 1928

Synonyms
- Jamaicaria Townsend, 1936

Genus of flies

Jamacaria is a genus of flies in the family Tachinidae.

== Species ==
- Jamacaria albofenestrata Curran, 1928

== Distribution ==
Jamaica.
