= Pachybates =

Scientific classification
- Kingdom: Animalia
- Phylum: Arthropoda
- Class: Insecta
- Order: Diptera
- Family: Athericidae
- Subfamily: Athericinae
- Genus: Pachybates; Bezzi, 1926

Type species
- Atherix braunsi Bequaert, 1921

Genus of flies

Pachybates is a genus of flies in the family Athericidae.

== Species ==
- Pachybates adeps Stuckenberg, 1961
- Pachybates braunsi (Bequaert, 1921)
- Pachybates incompletus (Bezzi, 1926)
