= Comyops =

Scientific classification
- Kingdom: Animalia
- Phylum: Arthropoda
- Class: Insecta
- Order: Diptera
- Family: Tachinidae
- Subfamily: Dexiinae
- Tribe: Dufouriini
- Genus: Comyops; Wulp, 1891

Type species
- Comyops nigripennis Wulp, 1891

Genus of flies

Comyops is a genus of bristle flies in the family Tachinidae.

== Species ==
- Comyops nigripennis Wulp, 1891
- Comyops striaticollis Wulp, 1891
