= Atrichops =

Scientific classification
- Kingdom: Animalia
- Phylum: Arthropoda
- Class: Insecta
- Order: Diptera
- Family: Athericidae
- Subfamily: Athericinae
- Genus: Atrichops; Verrall, 1909

Type species
- Atherix crassipes Meigen, 1820

Synonyms
- Heterosuragina Nagatomi, 1958

Genus of flies

Atrichops is a genus of flies in the family Athericidae.

== Species ==
- Atrichops apollinis Lindner, 1923
- Atrichops basiflava Yang, Dong & Zhang, 2016
- Atrichops chakratongi Nagatomi, 1979
- Atrichops chotei Nagatomi, 1979
- Atrichops crassipes (Meigen, 1820)
- Atrichops fontinalis (Nagatomi, 1958)
- Atrichops fulvithorax Nagatomi, 1984
- †Atrichops hesperius Cockerell, 1914
- Atrichops morimotoi (Nagatomi, 1953)
- Atrichops numidicus Thomas & Gagnéur, 1982
- Atrichops singularis Yang, Dong & Zhang, 2016
- Atrichops stuckenbergi Nagatomi, 1984
- Atrichops zhangae Yang, Dong & Zhang, 2016
