= Microphora =

Scientific classification
- Kingdom: Animalia
- Phylum: Arthropoda
- Class: Insecta
- Order: Diptera
- Family: Athericidae
- Subfamily: Athericinae
- Genus: Microphora; Kröber, 1912

Type species
- Microphora angustifrons Kröber, 1912

Synonyms
- Microphorina Strand, 1932

Genus of flies

Microphora is a genus of flies in the family Athericidae.

== Species ==
- Microphora angustifrons Kröber, 1912
