= Aciura =

Scientific classification
- Kingdom: Animalia
- Phylum: Arthropoda
- Class: Insecta
- Order: Diptera
- Family: Tephritidae
- Subfamily: Tephritinae
- Tribe: Tephrellini
- Genus: Aciura; Robineau-Desvoidy, 1830

Type species
- Aciura femoralis (= Musca coryli Rossi, 1794) Robineau-Desvoidy, 1830

Genus of flies

Aciura is a genus of tephritid or fruit flies in the family Tephritidae.

== Species ==
- Aciura afghana (Hering, 1961) (Synonym: Tephrella afghana Hering, 1961)
- Aciura coryli (Rossi, 1794)(Synonyms: Aciura femoralis Robineau-Desvoidy, 1830, Aciura powelli Seguy, 1930, Musca coryli Rossi, 1794)
