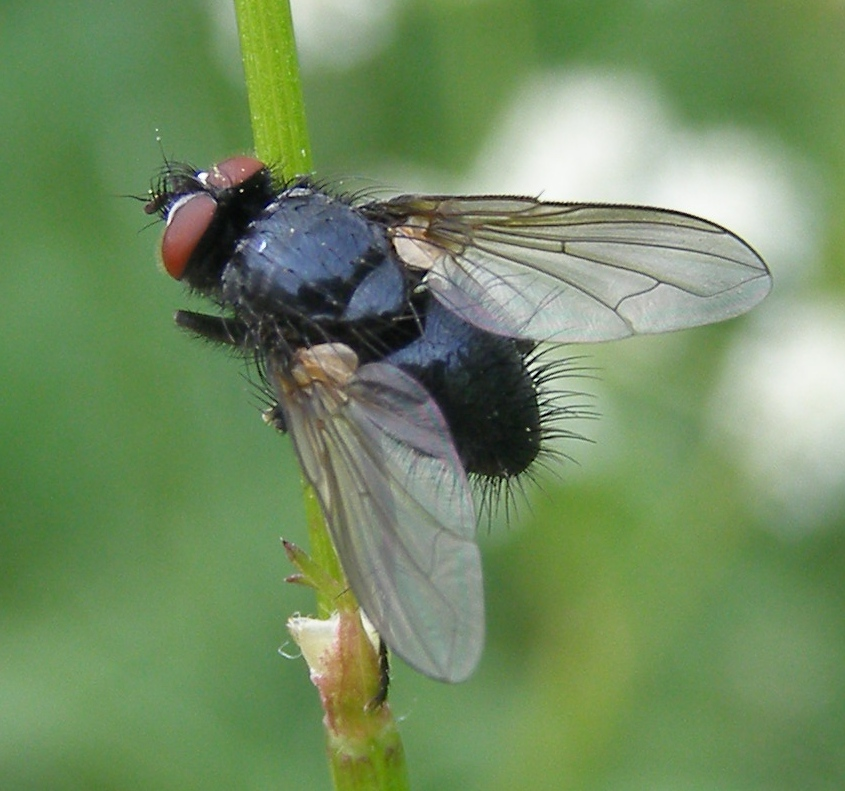
- Dufouria sp

Scientific classification
- Kingdom: Animalia
- Phylum: Arthropoda
- Class: Insecta
- Order: Diptera
- Family: Tachinidae
- Subfamily: Dexiinae
- Tribe: Dufouriini
- Genus: Dufouria; Robineau-Desvoidy, 1830

Type species
- Dufouria aperta Robineau-Desvoidy, 1830

Synonyms
- Ptilops Rondani, 1857; Calyptidia Robineau-Desvoidy, 1863; Phericia Robineau-Desvoidy, 1863; Silbermania Robineau-Desvoidy, 1863; Pseudoptilops Stein, 1924; Paramedoria Enderlein, 1934

= Dufouria =

Genus of flies

Dufouria is a genus of flies in the family Tachinidae.

== Species ==
- Dufouria americana (Reinhard, 1943)
- Dufouria canescens Herting, 1981
- Dufouria chalybeata (Meigen, 1824)
- Dufouria nigrita (Fallén, 1810)
- Dufouria nova Mesnil, 1968
- Dufouria occlusa (Robineau-Desvoidy, 1863)
