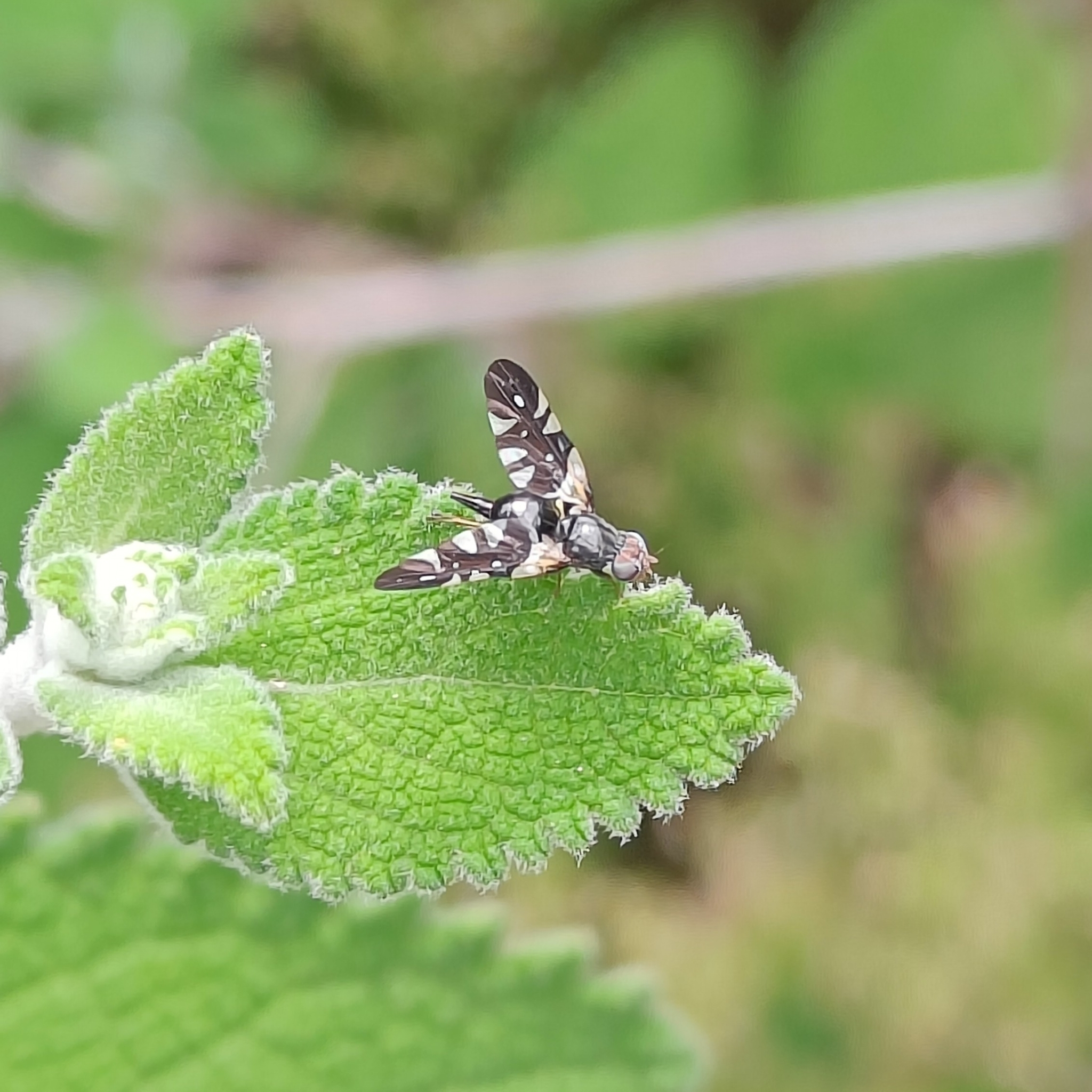

Scientific classification
- Kingdom: Animalia
- Phylum: Arthropoda
- Class: Insecta
- Order: Diptera
- Family: Tephritidae
- Subfamily: Tephritinae
- Tribe: Tephrellini
- Genus: Aciura
- Species: A. afghana

Binomial name
- Aciura afghana (Hering, 1961)

Synonyms
- Tephrella afghana Hering, 1961

= Aciura afghana =

Species of insect

Aciura afghana is a species of tephritid or fruit flies in the genus Aciura of the family Tephritidae.

It is found in Asia, Afghanistan, and Kabul.
