= Microsoma exiguum =

Scientific classification
- Kingdom: Animalia
- Phylum: Arthropoda
- Class: Insecta
- Order: Diptera
- Family: Tachinidae
- Subfamily: Dexiinae
- Tribe: Dufouriini
- Genus: Microsoma
- Species: M. exiguum

Binomial name
- Microsoma exiguum (Meigen, 1824)

Synonyms
- Tachina exiguum Meigen, 1824; Ahrensia femoralis Robineau-Desvoidy, 1863; Campogaster debilis Rondani, 1861; Campogaster parvula Rondani, 1861; Lythia flavicornis Robineau-Desvoidy, 1863; Megaera angustifrons Macquart, 1834; Megaera incurva Macquart, 1834; Microsoma nigra Macquart, 1855; Microsoma pannonica Herting & Dely-Draskovits, 1993; Phania flavipalpis Macquart, 1835; Plesionevra incisuralis Macquart, 1855; Stephensia ciligera Robineau-Desvoidy, 1863; Strongylogaster pannonius Loew, 1873; Syntomogaster singularis Egger, 1860; Syntomogaster vidua Egger, 1860; Tachina computa Walker, 1853; Tachina delicata Meigen, 1824

Species of fly

Microsoma exiguum is a species of fly in the family Tachinidae. It is a parasitoid of Sitona.

== Distribution ==
British Isles, Czech Republic, Hungary, Moldova, Poland, Romania, Slovakia, Ukraine, Finland, Sweden, Bulgaria, Croatia, Greece, Italy, Portugal, Slovenia, Spain, Turkey, Austria, Belgium, France, Germany, Netherlands, Switzerland, Japan, Iran, Israel, Palestine, Russia, Transcaucasia.
