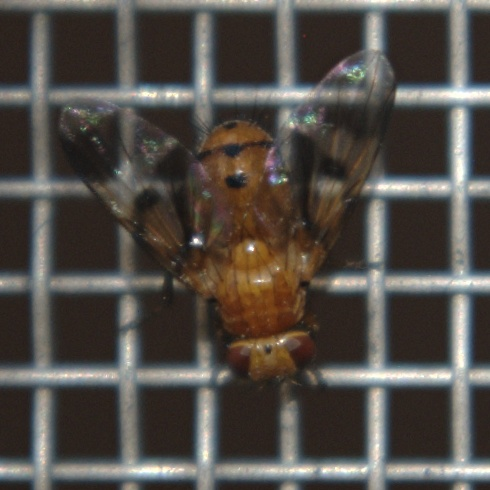

Scientific classification
- Kingdom: Animalia
- Phylum: Arthropoda
- Clade: Pancrustacea
- Class: Insecta
- Order: Diptera
- Family: Tachinidae
- Subfamily: Dexiinae
- Tribe: Dufouriini
- Genus: Oestrophasia; Brauer & von Bergenstamm, 1889

Type species
- Oestrophasia clausa Brauer & von Bergenstamm, 1889

Synonyms
- Cenosoma Wulp, 1890; Oestrophasiana Townsend, 1931

= Oestrophasia =

Genus of flies

Oestrophasia is a genus of bristle flies in the family Tachinidae.

== Species ==
- Oestrophasia calva Coquillett, 1902
- Oestrophasia clausa Brauer & von Bergenstamm, 1889
- Oestrophasia sabroskyi (Guimarães, 1977)
- Oestrophasia signifera (Wulp, 1890)
- Oestrophasia thompsoni Guimaraes, 1977
- Oestrophasia uncana (Fabricius, 1805)
