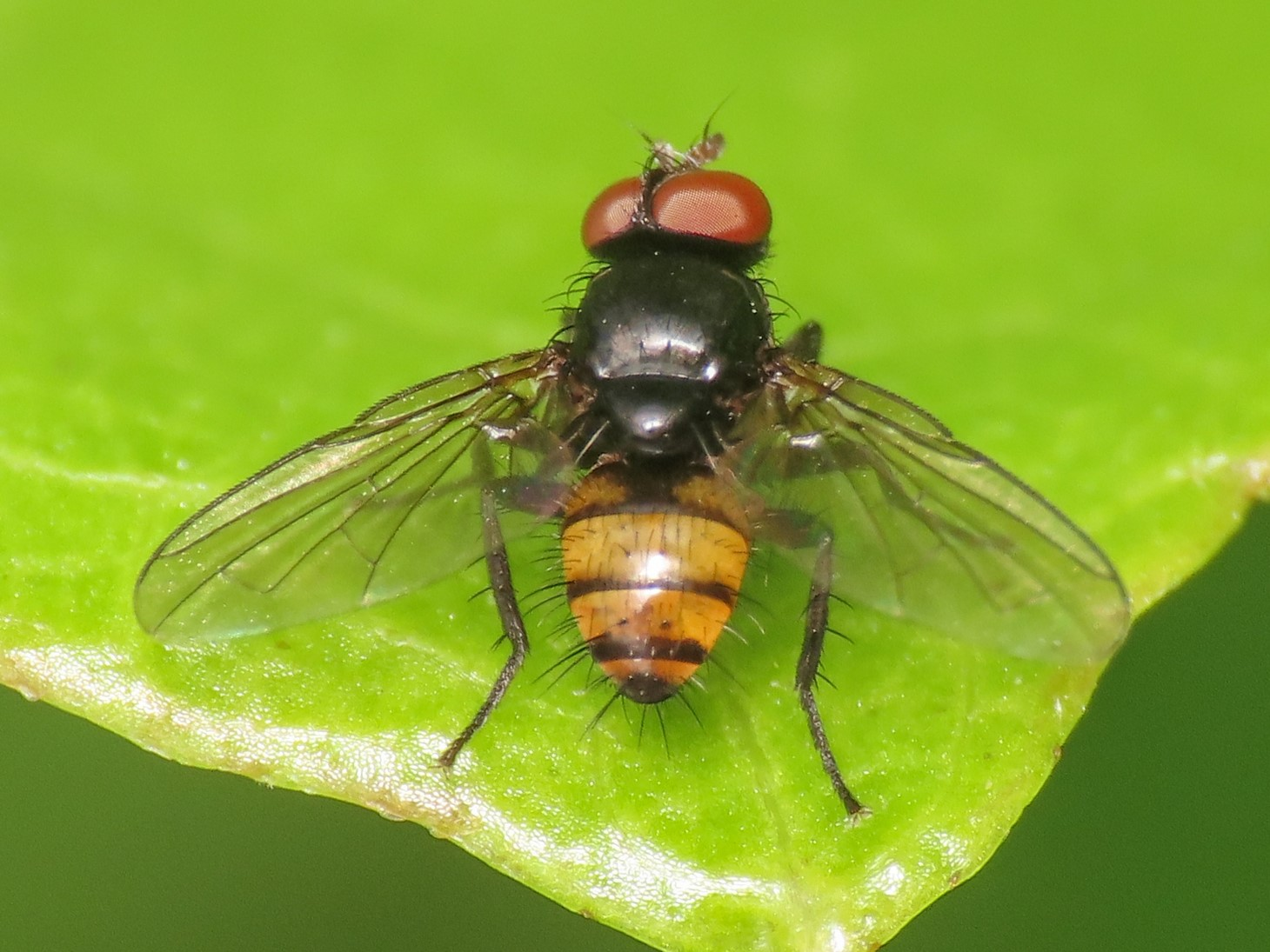
- Pandelleia crosskeyi

Scientific classification
- Kingdom: Animalia
- Phylum: Arthropoda
- Clade: Pancrustacea
- Class: Insecta
- Order: Diptera
- Family: Tachinidae
- Subfamily: Dexiinae
- Tribe: Dufouriini
- Genus: Pandelleia; Villeneuve, 1907

Type species
- Etheria sexpunctata Pandellé, 1896

Synonyms
- Afrophasia Curran, 1939; Xanthosyntomogaster Rohdendorf, 1923

= Pandelleia =

Genus of flies

Pandelleia is a genus of flies in the family Tachinidae.

== Species ==
- Pandelleia albipennis Villeneuve, 1934
- Pandelleia crosskeyi Santis & Nihei, 2021
- Pandelleia dimorphia (Curran, 1939)
- Pandelleia ornata (Rohdendorf, 1923)
- Pandelleia otiorrhynchi Villeneuve, 1922
- Pandelleia pilicauda (Mesnil, 1975)
- Pandelleia pilicauda Mesnil, 1975
- Pandelleia pschorni Mesnil, 1963
- Pandelleia sexpunctata (Pandellé, 1896)
- Pandelleia translucens (Mesnil, 1959)
