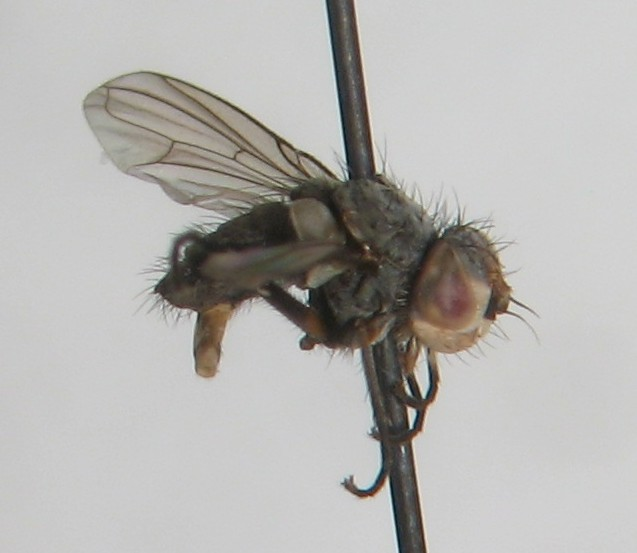
- Rondania dimidiata

Scientific classification
- Kingdom: Animalia
- Phylum: Arthropoda
- Class: Insecta
- Order: Diptera
- Family: Tachinidae
- Subfamily: Dexiinae
- Tribe: Dufouriini
- Genus: Rondania
- Species: R. dimidiata

Binomial name
- Rondania dimidiata (Meigen, 1824)

Synonyms
- Phasia opaca Zetterstedt, 1838; Phasia ruficeps Zetterstedt, 1838; Tachina dimidiata Meigen, 1824

= Rondania dimidiata =

Species of fly

Rondania dimidiata is a species of fly in the family Tachinidae.

== Distribution ==
Czech Republic, Hungary, Poland, Ukraine, Finland, Norway, Sweden, Bulgaria, Croatia, Italy, Slovenia, Spain, Austria, France, Germany, Switzerland, Russia.
