= Xeritha =

Scientific classification
- Kingdom: Animalia
- Phylum: Arthropoda
- Class: Insecta
- Order: Diptera
- Family: Athericidae
- Subfamily: Athericinae
- Genus: Xeritha; Stuckenberg, 1966

Type species
- Xeritha plaumanni Stuckenberg, 1966

Genus of flies

Xeritha is a genus of flies in the family Athericidae.

== Species ==
- Xeritha plaumanni Stuckenberg, 1966
