= Microsoma =

Scientific classification
- Kingdom: Animalia
- Phylum: Arthropoda
- Class: Insecta
- Order: Diptera
- Family: Tachinidae
- Subfamily: Dexiinae
- Tribe: Dufouriini
- Genus: Microsoma; Macquart, 1855

Type species
- Microsoma nigra Macquart, 1855

Synonyms
- Ahrensia Robineau-Desvoidy, 1863; Andrina Lioy, 1864; Campogaster Rondani, 1856; Campylura Rondani, 1860; Lythia Robineau-Desvoidy, 1863; Plesionevra Macquart, 1855; Stephensia Robineau-Desvoidy, 1863; Syntomogaster Egger, 1860; Syntomogaster Schiner, 1861

Genus of flies

Microsoma is a genus of flies in the family Tachinidae.

== Species ==
- Microsoma exiguum (Meigen, 1824)
- Microsoma vicinum (Mesnil, 1970)
