= Dasyomma =

Scientific classification
- Kingdom: Animalia
- Phylum: Arthropoda
- Clade: Pancrustacea
- Class: Insecta
- Order: Diptera
- Family: Athericidae
- Subfamily: Dasyommatinae
- Genus: Dasyomma; Macquart, 1840

Genus of flies

Dasyomma is a genus of flies in the family Athericidae.

== Species ==
- Dasyomma fulvum (Philippi, 1865)
- Dasyomma poecilogaster (Philippi, 1865)
- Dasyomma cinerascens (Philippi, 1865)
- Dasyomma abdominale Hardy, 1933
- Dasyomma atratulum Malloch, 1932
- Dasyomma atribasis Malloch, 1932
- Dasyomma atritarsis Malloch, 1932
- Dasyomma basale Malloch, 1932
- Dasyomma caerulea Macquart, 1840
- Dasyomma chapelco Coscarón, 1995
- Dasyomma chrysopilum Woodley, 2007
- Dasyomma coeruleum var. impressifrons Malloch, 1932
- Dasyomma croceicornis Bigot, 1887
- Dasyomma dissimile Hardy, 1920
- Dasyomma flavum Hardy, 1933
- Dasyomma gonzalezi Coscarón, 1995
- Dasyomma hardyi Paramonov, 1962
- Dasyomma herbsti Edwards, 1934
- Dasyomma hirticeps Malloch, 1932
- Dasyomma humerale Malloch, 1932
- Dasyomma hydrophilum Paramonov, 1962
- Dasyomma immaculatum Malloch, 1932
- Dasyomma infernale Paramonov, 1962
- Dasyomma maculipenne Hardy, 1920
- Dasyomma malleco Coscarón, 1995
- Dasyomma mcalpinei Paramonov, 1962
- Dasyomma norrisi Paramonov, 1962
- Dasyomma tasmanicum Paramonov, 1962
- Dasyomma tonnoiri Paramonov, 1962
- Dasyomma trianguliferous Coscarón, 1995
- Dasyomma trivittatum Malloch, 1932
- Dasyomma univittatum Malloch, 1932
- Dasyomma vittatum Malloch, 1932
- Dasyomma wirthi Coscarón, 1995
