= Asuragina =

Scientific classification
- Kingdom: Animalia
- Phylum: Arthropoda
- Class: Insecta
- Order: Diptera
- Family: Athericidae
- Subfamily: Athericinae
- Genus: Asuragina; Yang, 1992

Genus of flies

Asuragina is a genus of flies in the family Athericidae.

== Species ==
- Asuragina yangi Yang & Nagatomi, 1992
