= Trichacantha =

Scientific classification
- Kingdom: Animalia
- Phylum: Arthropoda
- Class: Insecta
- Order: Diptera
- Family: Athericidae
- Subfamily: Athericinae
- Genus: Trichacantha; Stuckenberg, 1955

Type species
- Trichacantha atranupta

Genus of flies

Trichacantha is a genus of flies in the family Athericidae.

== Species ==
- Trichacantha atranupta Stuckenberg, 1955
