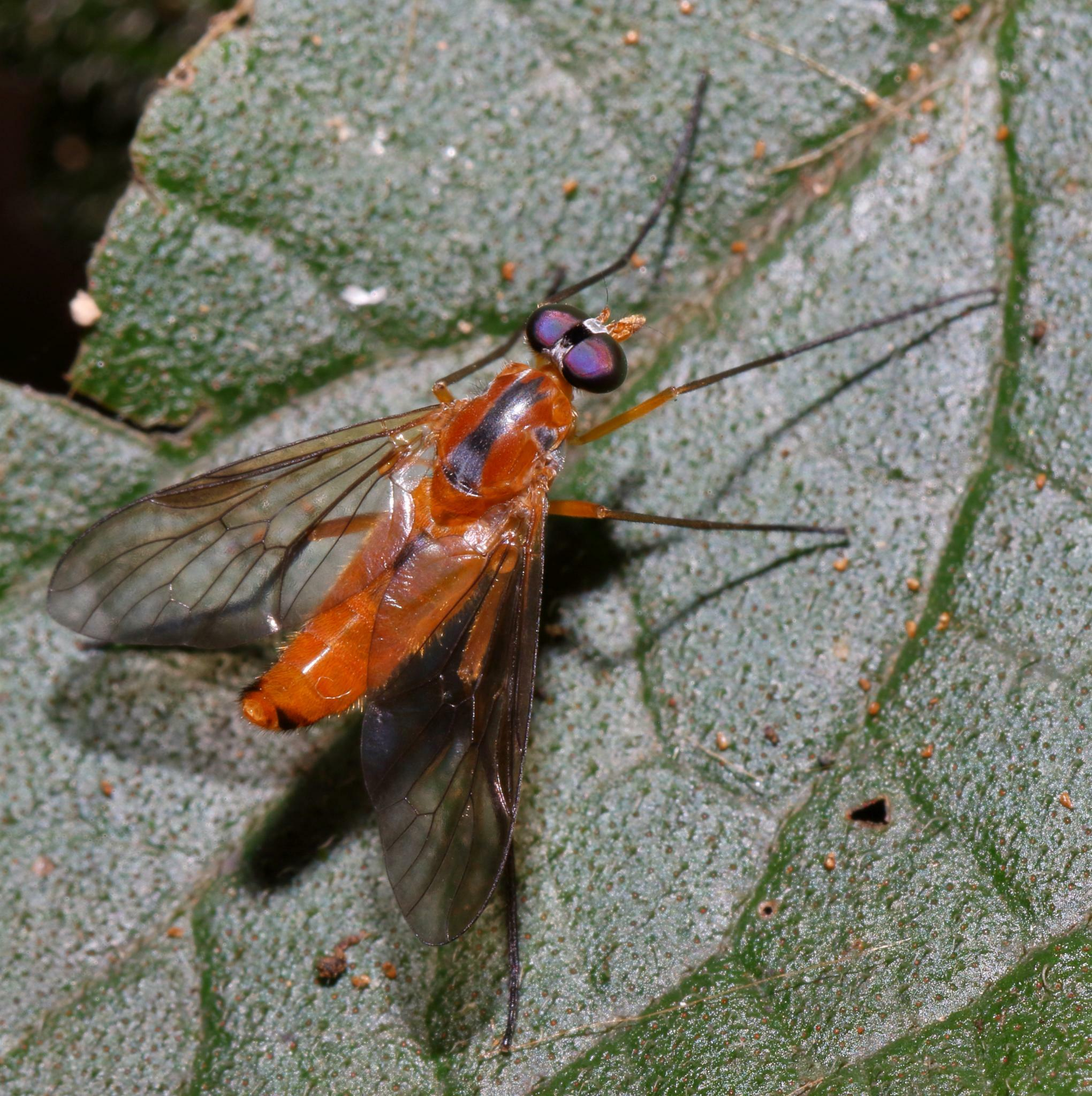
- Suragina monogramma

Scientific classification
- Kingdom: Animalia
- Phylum: Arthropoda
- Class: Insecta
- Order: Diptera
- Family: Athericidae
- Subfamily: Athericinae
- Genus: Suragina; Walker, 1859

Type species
- Suragina illucens Walker, 1859

= Suragina =

Genus of flies

Suragina is a genus of flies in the family Athericidae.

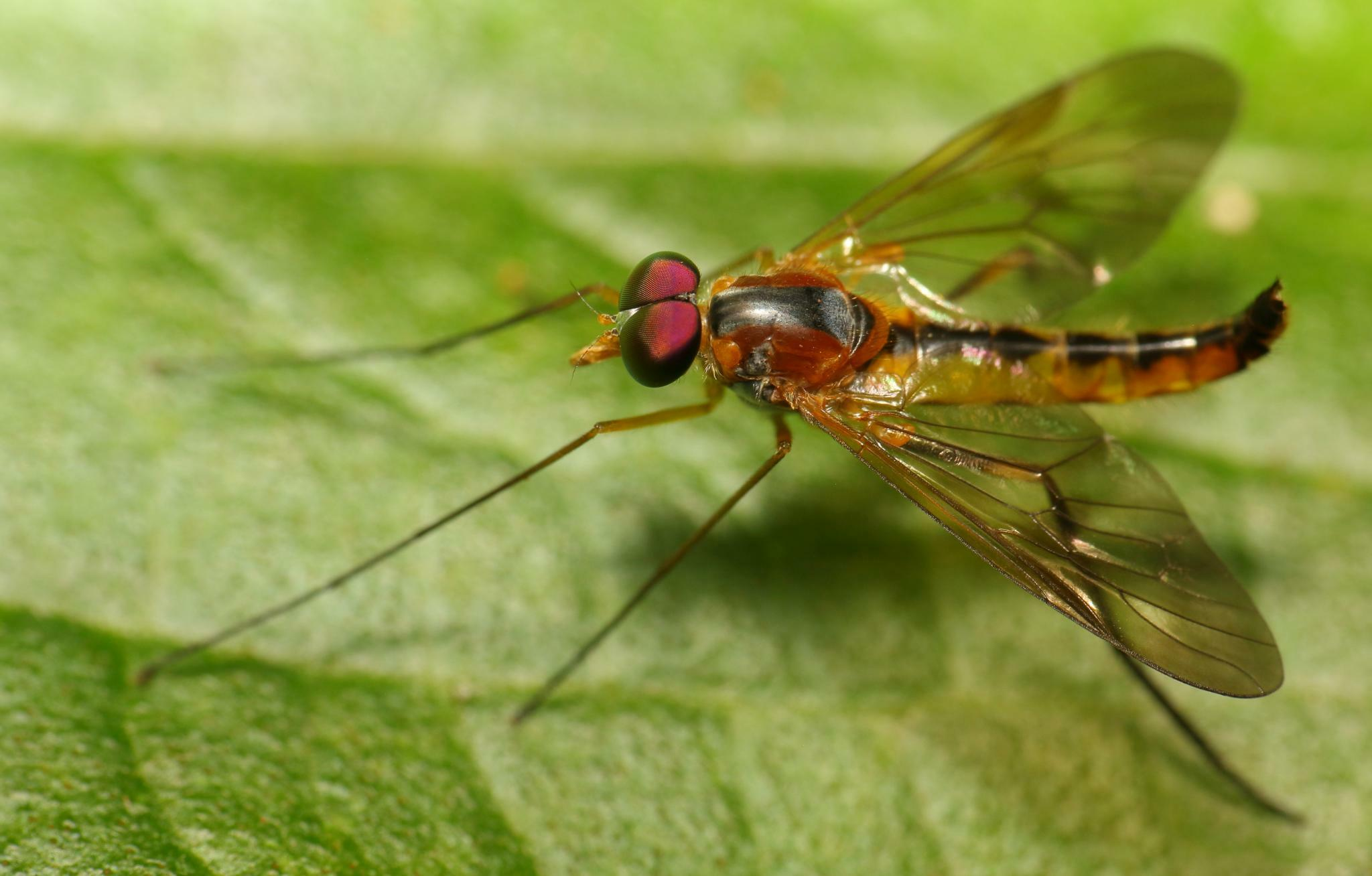
Suragina bivittata

== Species ==
- Suragina agramma (Bezzi, 1926)
- Suragina bezzii (Curran, 1928)
- Suragina bimaculata Yang, Dong & Zhang, 2016
- Suragina bivittata (Bezzi, 1926)
- Suragina brevis Yang, Dong & Zhang, 2016
- Suragina brunetti Malloch, 1932
- Suragina caerulescens (Brunetti, 1912)
- Suragina calopa (Brunetti, 1909)
- Suragina cincta (Brunetti, 1909)
- Suragina concinna (Williston, 1901)
- Suragina coomani (Séguy, 1946)
- Suragina decorata Brunetti, 1927
- Suragina dimidiatipennis (Brunetti, 1929)
- Suragina disciclara (Speiser, 1914)
- Suragina elegans Karsch, 1884
- Suragina falsa Oldroyd, 1939
- Suragina fascipennis (Bezzi, 1916)
- Suragina flavifemur Yang, Dong & Zhang, 2016
- Suragina flaviscutellum Yang & Nagatomi, 1991
- Suragina fujianensis Yang, 2003
- Suragina furcata (Meijere, 1911)
- Suragina guangxiensis Yang & Nagatomi, 1991
- Suragina illucens Walker, 1859
- Suragina intermedia (Brunetti, 1909)
- Suragina jinxiuensis Yang, Dong & Zhang, 2016
- Suragina labiata (Bigot, 1887)
- Suragina lanopyga (Brunetti, 1909)
- Suragina latipennis (Bellardi, 1861)
- Suragina limbata (Osten Sacken, 1882)
- Suragina longipes (Bellardi, 1861)
- Suragina lucens (Meijere, 1911)
- Suragina metatarsalis (Brunetti, 1909)
- Suragina milloti (Séguy, 1951)
- Suragina monogramma (Bezzi, 1926)
- Suragina nigripes Malloch, 1932
- Suragina nigriscutellum Yang, Dong & Zhang, 2016
- Suragina nigritarsis (Doleschall, 1858)
- Suragina nigromaculata (Brunetti, 1929)
- Suragina pacaraima Rafael & Henriques, 1991
- Suragina pauliani Stuckenberg, 1965
- Suragina s-fuscum (Frey, 1954)
- Suragina satsumana (Matsumura, 1916)
- Suragina shii Yang, Dong & Zhang, 2016
- Suragina signipennis Walker, 1861
- Suragina sinensis Yang & Nagatomi, 1991
- Suragina tricincta (Meijere, 1929)
- Suragina uruma Nagatomi, 1985
- Suragina varicolor (Brunetti, 1929)
- Suragina yaeyamana Nagatomi, 1979
- Suragina yaeyamana Nagatomi, 1979
- Suragina yonganensis Yang, Dong & Zhang, 2016
- Suragina yunnanensis Yang & Nagatomi, 1991
