= Kambaitimyia =

Scientific classification
- Kingdom: Animalia
- Phylum: Arthropoda
- Class: Insecta
- Order: Diptera
- Family: Tachinidae
- Subfamily: Dexiinae
- Tribe: Dufouriini
- Genus: Kambaitimyia; Mesnil, 1953

Type species
- Kambaitimyia carbonata Mesnil, 1953

Genus of flies

Kambaitimyia is a genus of flies in the family Tachinidae.

== Species ==
- Kambaitimyia carbonata Mesnil, 1953
- Kambaitimyia rufipes Mesnil, 1957

== Distribution ==
Myanmar.
