= Euoestrophasia =

Scientific classification
- Kingdom: Animalia
- Phylum: Arthropoda
- Class: Insecta
- Order: Diptera
- Family: Tachinidae
- Subfamily: Dexiinae
- Tribe: Dufouriini
- Genus: Euoestrophasia; Townsend, 1892

Type species
- Oestrophasia aperta Brauer & von Bergenstamm, 1889

Genus of flies

Euoestrophasia is a genus of flies in the family Tachinidae.

== Species ==
- Euoestrophasia aperta (Brauer & von Bergenstamm, 1889)
- Euoestrophasia crosskeyi Guimarães, 1977
- Euoestrophasia guatemalensis Guimarães, 1977
- Euoestrophasia panamensis Guimarães, 1977
- Euoestrophasia plaumanni Guimarães, 1977
- Euoestrophasia portoriquensis Guimarães, 1977
- Euoestrophasia townsendi Guimarães, 1977
