= Mesnilana =

Scientific classification
- Kingdom: Animalia
- Phylum: Arthropoda
- Class: Insecta
- Order: Diptera
- Family: Tachinidae
- Subfamily: Dexiinae
- Tribe: Dufouriini
- Genus: Mesnilana; Emden, 1945

Type species
- Mesnilana bevisi Emden, 1945

Genus of flies

Mesnilana is a genus of flies in the family Tachinidae.

== Species ==
- Mesnilana bevisi Emden, 1945

== Distribution ==
South Africa
