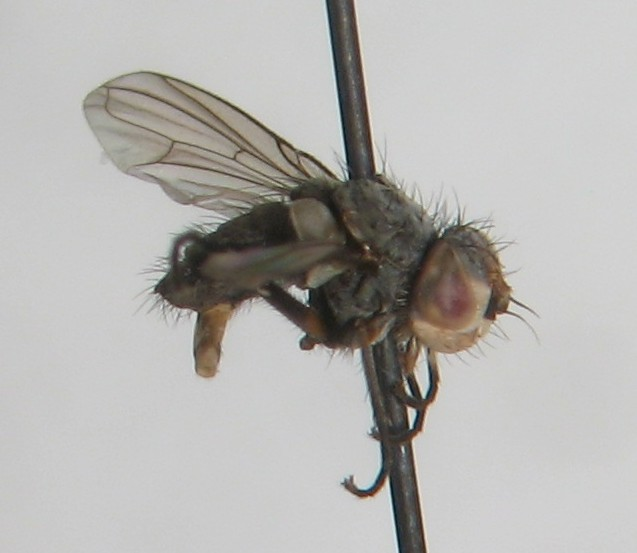
- Rondania dimidiata

Scientific classification
- Kingdom: Animalia
- Phylum: Arthropoda
- Class: Insecta
- Order: Diptera
- Family: Tachinidae
- Subfamily: Dexiinae
- Tribe: Dufouriini
- Genus: Rondania; Robineau-Desvoidy, 1850

Type species
- Rondania cucullata Robineau-Desvoidy, 1850

Synonyms
- Dysthrixa Pandellé, 1894; Microtricha Mik, 1887; Stylomyia Wulp, 1869

= Rondania =

Genus of flies

Rondania is a genus of flies in the family Tachinidae.

== Species ==
- Rondania albipilosa Cantrell & Burwell, 2010
- Rondania cinerea Cantrell & Burwell, 2010
- Rondania cucullata Robineau-Desvoidy, 1850
- Rondania dimidiata (Meigen, 1824)
- Rondania dispar (Dufour, 1851)
- Rondania fasciata (Macquart, 1834)
- Rondania insularis (Bigot, 1891)
- Rondania junatovi Richter, 1979
- Rondania rubens Herting, 1969
