= Ebenia =

Scientific classification
- Kingdom: Animalia
- Phylum: Arthropoda
- Class: Insecta
- Order: Diptera
- Family: Tachinidae
- Subfamily: Dexiinae
- Tribe: Dufouriini
- Genus: Ebenia; Macquart, 1846

Type species
- Ebenia claripennis Macquart, 1846

Genus of flies

Ebenia is a genus of flies in the family Tachinidae.

== Species ==
- Ebenia claripennis Macquart, 1846
- Ebenia fumata (Wulp, 1895)
- Ebenia neofumata Santis & Nihei 2022
- Ebenia nigripennis (Wulp 1891) - originally described as Comyops nigripennis
- Ebenia striaticollis (Wulp 1891) - originally described as Comyops striaticollis
- Ebenia trichopoda (Wulp, 1891)
