= Chetoptilia =

Scientific classification
- Kingdom: Animalia
- Phylum: Arthropoda
- Class: Insecta
- Order: Diptera
- Family: Tachinidae
- Subfamily: Dexiinae
- Tribe: Dufouriini
- Genus: Chetoptilia; Rondani, 1862

Type species
- Ptilops puella Rondani, 1862

Synonyms
- Chaetoptiliopsis Baranov, 1938; Paraptilops Mesnil, 1975; Chaetoptilia Bezzi & Stein, 1907

Genus of flies

Chetoptilia is a genus of flies in the family Tachinidae.

== Species ==
- Chetoptilia angustifrons Mesnil, 1953
- Chetoptilia burmanica (Baranov, 1938)
- Chetoptilia cyanea Mesnil, 1968
- Chetoptilia metallica Mesnil, 1968
- Chetoptilia plumicornis Villeneuve, 1942
- Chetoptilia puella (Rondani, 1862)
