= Suraginella =

Scientific classification
- Kingdom: Animalia
- Phylum: Arthropoda
- Class: Insecta
- Order: Diptera
- Family: Athericidae
- Subfamily: Athericinae
- Genus: Suraginella; Stuckenberg, 2000

Type species
- Suraginella macalpinei Stuckenberg, 2000

Genus of flies

Suraginella is a genus of flies in the family Athericidae.

== Species ==
- Suraginella macalpinei Stuckenberg, 2000
