= Rhinophoroides =

Scientific classification
- Kingdom: Animalia
- Phylum: Arthropoda
- Class: Insecta
- Order: Diptera
- Family: Tachinidae
- Subfamily: Dexiinae
- Tribe: Dufouriini
- Genus: Rhinophoroides; Barraclough, 2005

Type species
- Rhinophoroides minutus Barraclough, 2005

Genus of flies

Rhinophoroides is a genus of flies in the family Tachinidae.

== Species ==
- Rhinophoroides minutus Barraclough, 2005

== Distribution ==
South Africa
