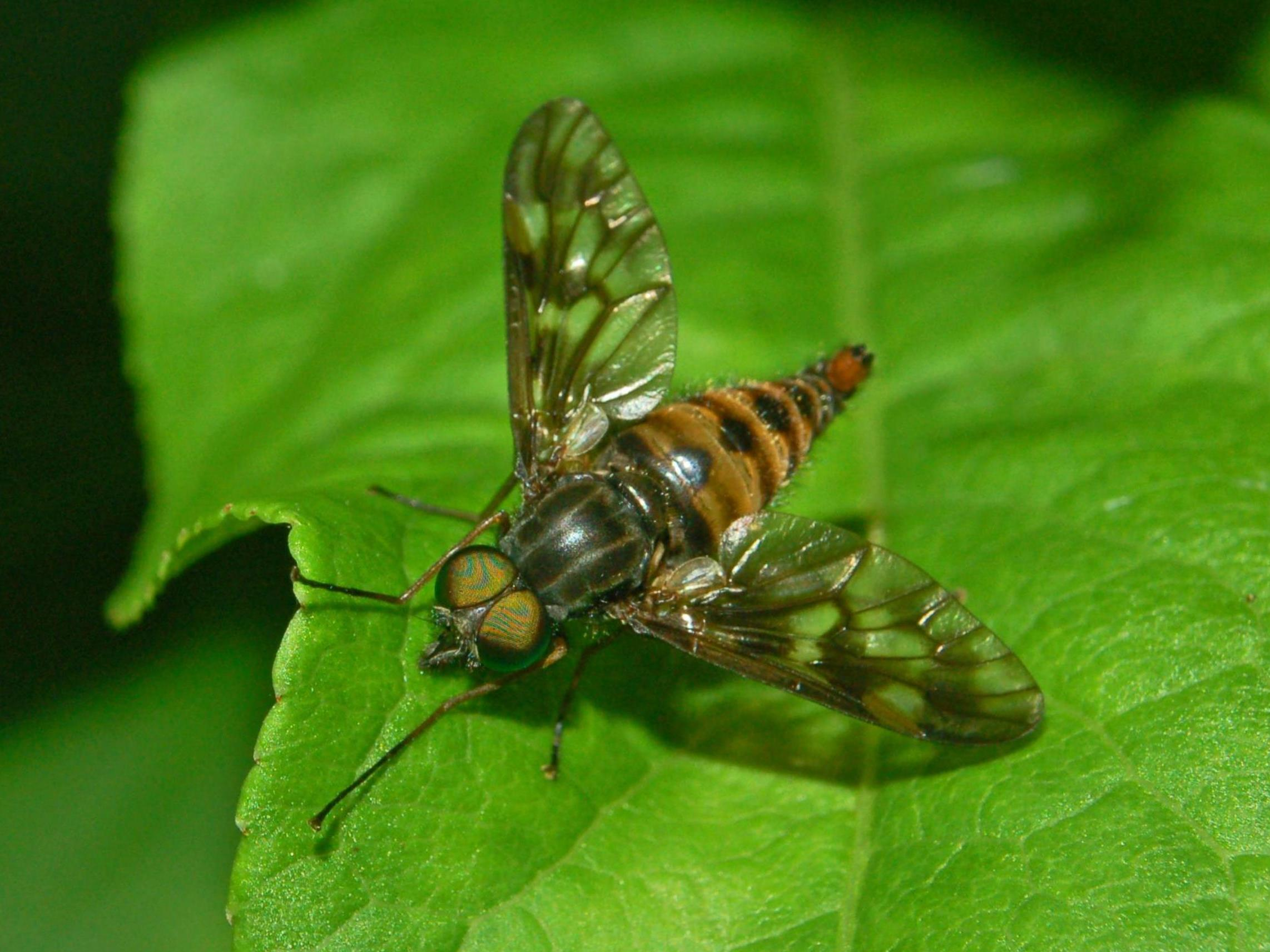
- Atherix ibis

Scientific classification
- Kingdom: Animalia
- Phylum: Arthropoda
- Class: Insecta
- Order: Diptera
- Family: Athericidae
- Subfamily: Athericinae
- Genus: Atherix; Meigen, 1803

Synonyms
- Ibisia Róndani, 1856; Atherigia Szilády, 1934

= Atherix =

Genus of flies

Atherix is a genus of 'ibis flies' belonging to the family Athericidae, a small family very similar to the Rhagionidae (snipe flies). Species within this genus are present in most of Europe and also in the Nearctic realm.

== Species ==
- Atherix alagezica Paramonov, 1926
- Atherix amicorum (Thomas, 1985)
- Atherix apfelbecki Strobl, 1902
- Atherix aurichalcea Becker, 1921
- Atherix basilica Nagatomi, 1958
- Atherix chrysopiliformis Lindner, 1924
- Atherix dalmatica (Szilády, 1934)
- Atherix dispar Bezzi, 1909
- Atherix erythraspis Bezzi, 1909
- Atherix flavipes (Fabricius, 1781)
- Atherix ibis (Fabricius, 1798)
- Atherix ignota Szilády, 1934
- Atherix lantha Webb, 1977
- Atherix lugubris Macquart, 1834
- Atherix marginata (Fabricius, 1781)
- Atherix maroccana Séguy, 1930
- Atherix neotropica Lindner, 1924
- Atherix nicolae Thomas, 1993
- Atherix pachypus Bigot, 1887
- Atherix picta Loew, 1869
- Atherix vaillanti (Thomas, 1982)
- Atherix variegata Walker, 1848
- Atherix vicina Szilády, 1943
