= Eugymnopeza =

Scientific classification
- Kingdom: Animalia
- Phylum: Arthropoda
- Class: Insecta
- Order: Diptera
- Family: Tachinidae
- Subfamily: Dexiinae
- Tribe: Dufouriini
- Genus: Eugymnopeza; Townsend, 1933

Type species
- Eugymnopeza braueri Townsend, 1933

Tribe of flies

Eugymnopeza is a genus of flies in the family Tachinidae.

== Species ==
- Eugymnopeza braueri Townsend, 1933
- Eugymnopeza imparilis Herting, 1973
