= Aciura coryli =

- Aciura coryli imago on Ballota nigra, in Bucharest, Romania

Scientific classification
- Kingdom: Animalia
- Phylum: Arthropoda
- Class: Insecta
- Order: Diptera
- Family: Tephritidae
- Subfamily: Tephritinae
- Tribe: Tephrellini
- Genus: Aciura
- Species: A. coryli

Binomial name
- Aciura coryli (Rossi, 1794)

Synonyms
- Musca coryli Rossi, 1794; Aciura femoralis Robineau-Desvoidy, 1830; Aciura powelli Séguy, 1930

Species of fly

Aciura coryli fly on Ballota nigra, in Bucharest, Romania

Aciura coryli is a species of tephritid or fruit flies in the genus Aciura of the family Tephritidae.

The larvae of this species live in flowers of Phlomis and Ballota (Labiatae). Its distribution encompasses the entire Mediterranean region, where it is often collected in locations with large stocks of host plants. Published reports of Aciura coryli appearances in Central Europe (Austria, Hungary, Czech Republic) have not been confirmed in recent decades, however recent reports present evidence of its continued presence in the region.
