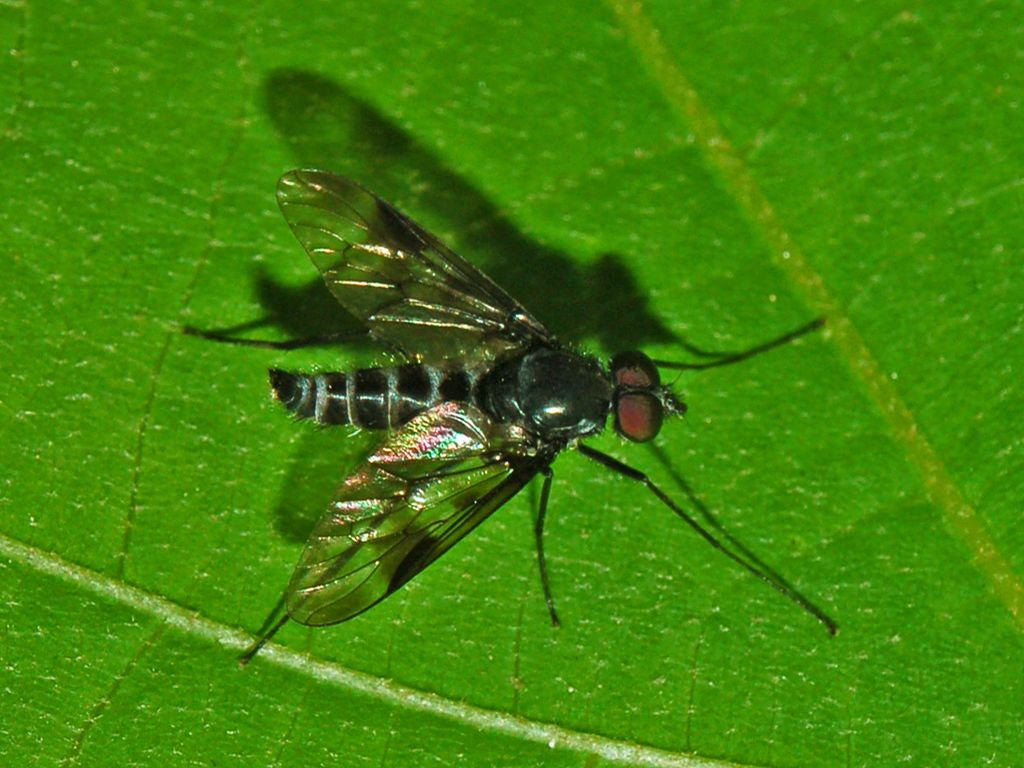
- Atherix marginata. Male
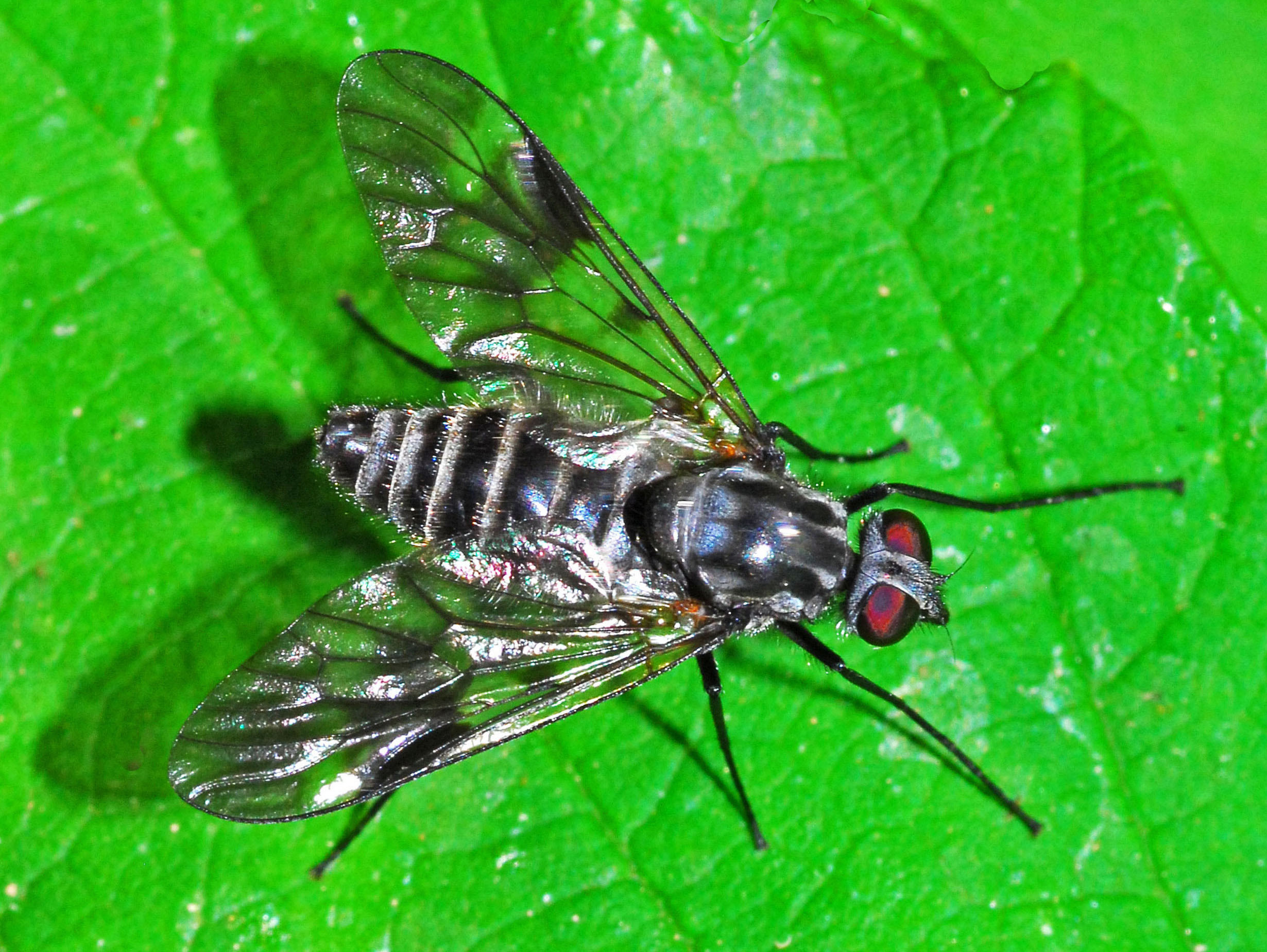
- Female

Scientific classification
- Kingdom: Animalia
- Phylum: Arthropoda
- Class: Insecta
- Order: Diptera
- Family: Athericidae
- Subfamily: Athericinae
- Genus: Atherix
- Species: A. marginata

Binomial name
- Atherix marginata (Fabricius, 1781)

Synonyms
- Bibio marginata Fabricius, 1781; Ibisia atherix (Donovan, 1813); Musca atherix Donovan, 1813

= Atherix marginata =

Species of fly

Atherix marginata, the black-legged water-snipefly, is a species of ibis flies belonging to the family Athericidae, a small family very similar to the Rhagionidae (snipe flies).

== Distribution ==
This species is present in most of Europe (Albania, Austria, Belgium, Bosnia and Herzegovina, British Islands, Bulgaria, Croatia, Czech Republic, Denmark, France, Germany, Hungary, Ireland, Italy, Poland, Portugal, Romania, Slovakia, Spain, Switzerland and The Netherlands).

== Description ==
The body is quite slender, eyes are rounded and well separated, antennae are trisegmented, costae are extended around the whole wings, and the abdomen has several dark and clear stripes. The legs are entirely black (hence the common name).

== Biology ==
Adults can be found from May to Augusty. Adult females gather in large clumps and lay egg masses on tree branches or under bridges over flowing waters. In such a way, the first-stage larvae will fall into the water, where they start their lives. The larvae are aquatic and saprophagous. They show 6-8 abdominal segments.

== Habitat ==
These ibis flies are usually found alongside shallow rivers and streams, especially in hilly areas., where the larvae develop as predators.
