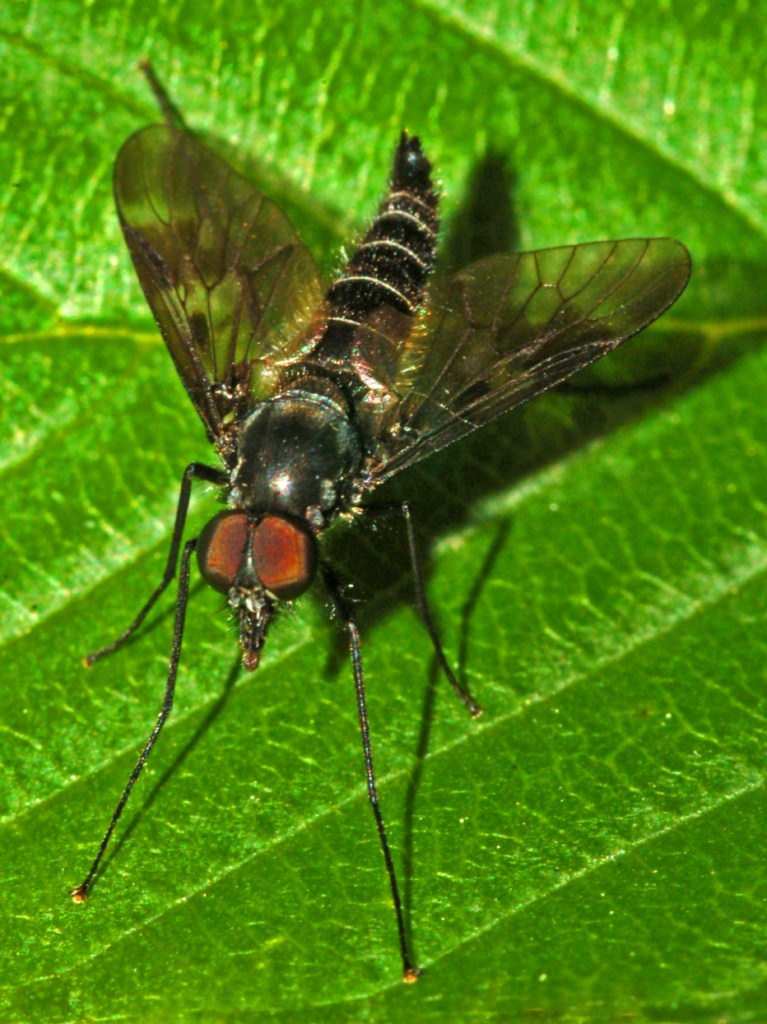
- Atherix marginata

Scientific classification
- Kingdom: Animalia
- Phylum: Arthropoda
- Clade: Pancrustacea
- Class: Insecta
- Order: Diptera
- Superfamily: Tabanoidea
- Family: Athericidae; Stuckenberg, 1973

= Athericidae =

Athericidae Temporal range: Middle Jurassic–Recent

Family of flies

Athericidae is a small family of flies known as water snipe flies or ibis flies. They used to be placed in the family Rhagionidae, but were removed by Stuckenberg in 1973. They are now known to be more closely related to Tabanidae. Species of Athericidae are found worldwide.

== Ecology ==
The adults mostly feed on nectar but some species feed on mammal blood. Hematophagy has been demonstrated in adult Suragina and Suraginella and is suspected in other genera. Larvae do not feed in the first instar; after first molting, they become predatory. Larvae typically prey on invertebrates or are saprophagous.

The larvae have distinctive morphology. Their head capsule is well developed dorsally, and they have long abdominal prolegs with crocheted hooks. These structures help the larvae move without being washed away in their preferred larval habitat, fast-flowing montane streams and torrents. The larvae are predators of other aquatic invertebrates such as caddisflies. Adults have stout, tapered abdomens, slightly elongated legs, with aristate antennae. Males are sexually dimorphic with holoptic eyes.

Adult athericids usually rest on the upper surface of leaves, near the streams from which they emerge, or more inland if they are looking for a blood meal. Athericids commonly stroke or palpate the surface of leaves, an action they share with the Tabanidae. All species deposit their eggs at one time and then die.

== Subfamilies and genera ==
Two subfamilies are described; the Dasyommatinae contain only Dasyomma and all other extant genera are in the Athericinae.

- Dasyommatinae
  - Dasyomma Macquart, 1840
- Athericinae
  - Asuragina Yang & Nagatomi, 1992
  - Atherix Meigen, 1803
  - Atrichops Verrall, 1909
  - Microphora Krober, 1840
  - Pachybates Bezzi, 1926
  - Suragina Walker, 1858
  - Suraginella Stuckenberg, 2000
  - Trichacantha Stuckenberg, 1955
  - Xeritha Stuckenberg, 1966
  - †Athericites Mostovski, Jarzembowski & Coram, 2003
  - †Succinatherix Stuckenberg, 1974 Baltic amber, Eocene
