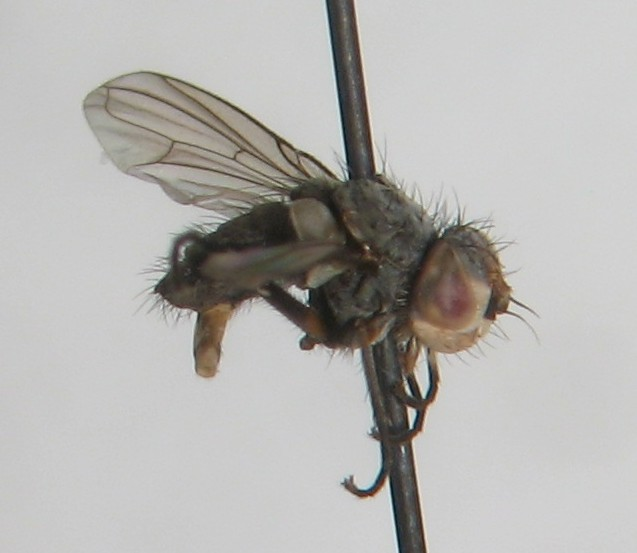
- Rondania dimidiata

Scientific classification
- Domain: Eukaryota
- Kingdom: Animalia
- Phylum: Arthropoda
- Class: Insecta
- Order: Diptera
- Family: Tachinidae
- Subfamily: Dexiinae
- Tribe: Dufouriini

= Dufouriini =

Tribe of flies

Dufouriini is a tribe of flies in the family Tachinidae.

== Genera ==
- Chetoptilia Rondani, 1862
- Comyops Wulp, 1891
- Dufouria Robineau-Desvoidy, 1830
- Ebenia Macquart, 1846
- Eugymnopeza Townsend, 1933
- Euoestrophasia Townsend, 1892
- Jamacaria Curran, 1928
- Kambaitimyia Mesnil, 1953
- Mesnilana Van Emden, 1945
- Microsoma Macquart, 1855
- Oestrophasia Brauer & von Bergenstamm, 1889
- Pandelleia Villeneuve, 1907
- Rhinophoroides Barraclough, 2005
- Rondania Robineau-Desvoidy, 1850
