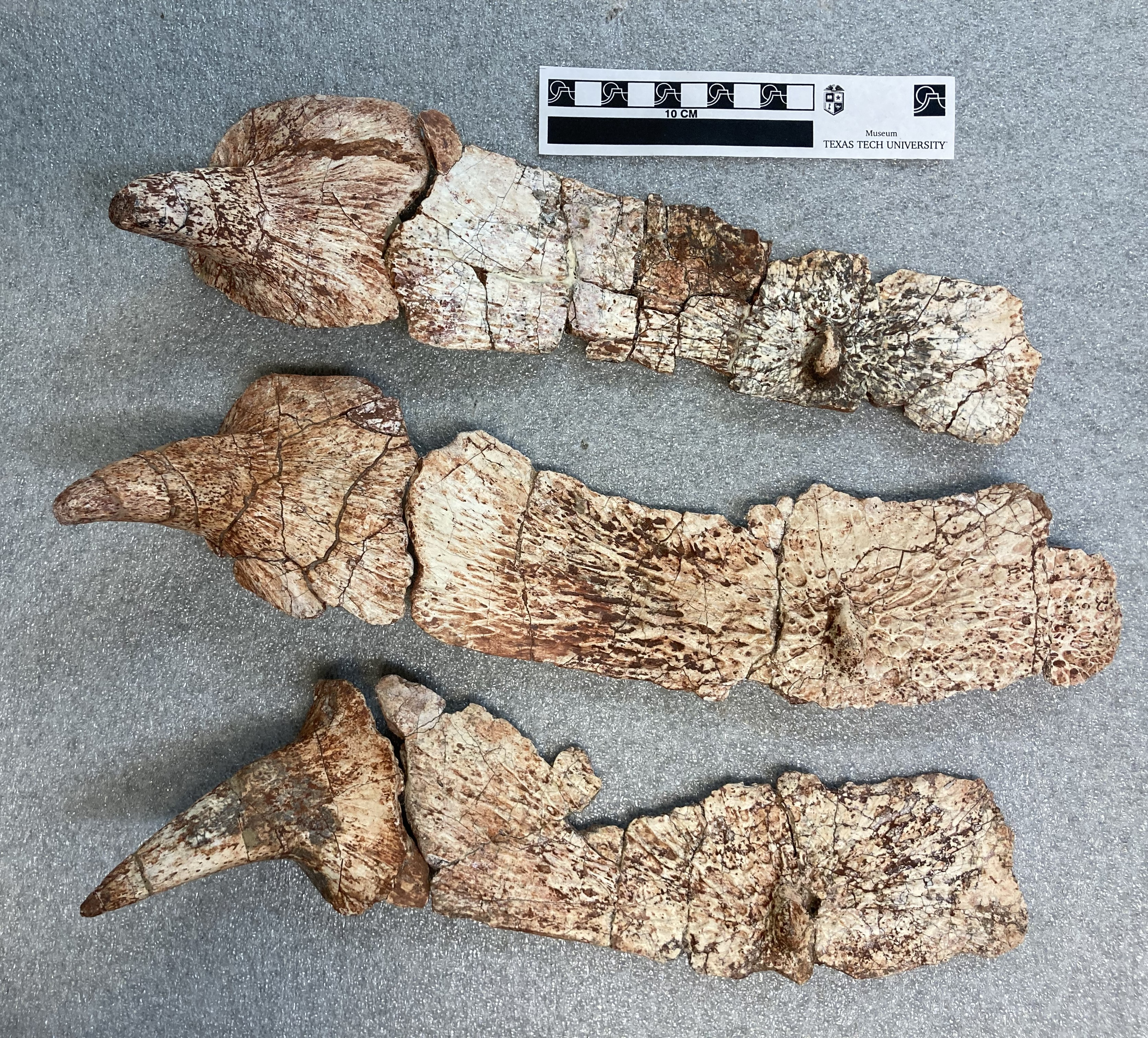
- A portion of the holotype of Garzapelta muelleri, representing the paramedian and lateral osteoderms, located in the collections of the Museum of Texas Tech University.

Scientific classification
- Kingdom: Animalia
- Phylum: Chordata
- Class: Reptilia
- Clade: Archosauria
- Clade: Pseudosuchia
- Order: †Aetosauria
- Family: †Stagonolepididae
- Genus: †Garzapelta; Reyes, Martz & Small, 2024
- Species: †G. muelleri

Binomial name
- †Garzapelta muelleri Reyes, Martz & Small, 2024

= Garzapelta =

Garzapelta Temporal range: Norian

Genus of archosaur

Garzapelta is an extinct genus of aetosaur from the Late Triassic Cooper Canyon Formation containing a single species, G. muelleri. Garzapelta is known primarily from an associated collection of osteoderms, although some other bones such as ribs are also known. The anatomy of Garzapelta's armour displays a mix of features otherwise seen in Rioarribasuchus chamaensis, a member of the Paratypothoracini, and taxa of the subfamily Desmatosuchinae. This mix of characters is so distinct that phylogenetic analysis yielded different results based on what parts of the osteoderms were used, suggesting that the current dataset does not account for convergent evolution in osteoderm anatomy. Reyes, Martz and Small suggest that Garzapelta was likely a paratypothoracin that simply evolved lateral osteoderms similar to those of desmatosuchins, reasoning that its armour does not articulate in the way seen in members of the latter group.

== History and naming ==
The remains of Garzaspelta were discovered in 1989 in the UU Sand Creek locality (MOTT 3882) in the middle units of the Cooper Canyon Formation by paleontologist Bill Mueller and fossil collector Emmett Shedd. The age of the locality is not entirely clear, but based on its stratigraphy relative to the Miller Ranch Sandstone it may date to the latest Adamanian or earliest Revueltian, a period of faunal turnover for aetosaurs. The material consisted of a collection of associated bones of a large aetosaur, primarily consisting of osteoderms and ribs, though a single element of the foot is also among these fossils. The specimen, TTU-P 10449, received some attention by Jeffrey W. Martz and his colleagues in 2003 in a study that argued that, given its unique anatomy, it was likely to represent a distinct taxon. However, this new taxon would not be named for another 20 years until Reyes, Martz and Small published a study in 2024 formally naming the animal Garzapelta.

The first part of the name Garzapelta reflects the geographic origin of the animal, as the type locality lies in Garza County, Texas. The suffix "-pelta" meanwhile translates to "shield" in allusion to the animal's extensive armour. The species name meanwhile honours Bill D. Mueller not only for his participation in discovering the original material but also for his overall contribution to aetosaur research and Triassic paleontology in Texas.

== Description ==
The armour of Garzapelta, like that of other aetosaurs, can generally be split into several regions depending on their position relative to the underlying skeleton. The cervical osteoderms just above the neck, the trunk vertebrae that cover the torso (themselves separated into anterior, mid and posterior trunk vertebrae), the sacral osteoderms above the hip and the caudal osteoderms that surround the tail (which can be further separated much like the trunk vertebrae. Additionally, the armour is composed of paramedian and lateral osteoderms depending on their position relative to the spine, with paramedian osteoderms being those located directly above the vertebral column and meeting in the middle, with the lateral osteoderms being those that attach to either side of this central double row.

=== Paramedian osteoderms ===
Towards the middle of the trunk the osteoderms are notably wider than they are long, with the width to length ration being somewhere around 3.0 to 3.5. This is similar to the proportions of Rioarribasuchus, but not as extreme as the values seen in other typothoracines. The dorsal eminence of the paramedian osteoderms, a prominent ridge on their surface, is offset from the midline and located further towards the back, yet does not touch the edge of the element. The anterior margin of the dorsal paramedians before the tail is described as a thin and smooth strip of bone that lacks the ornamentation seen on the rest of the surface. The anterior paramedian osteoderms above the tail have a distinct sinuous back edge that also features a "tongue-like" process just behind the dorsal eminence. It is noted that the paramedian and lateral osteoderms of Garzapelta, unlike those of desmatosuchines, do not articulate in the same rigid groove and ridge articulation and instead overlap the anteromedial corner of the lateral osteoderms. The surface of the osteoderms is ornamented by various grooves and ridges that radiate outward from the dorsal eminence.

=== Lateral osteoderms ===
The lateral osteoderms consist of three primary regions, the flat dorsal flange that articulates to the paramedian osteoderms along their medial edge (which is distinctly sigmoid in the anterior trunk vertebrae), the downward-facing lateral flange that forms the outermost edge of the element and a large spike-like dorsal eminence similar to those seen in Longosuchus, Lucasuchus and Sierritasuchus, which is formed in the region where the dorsal and lateral flanges meet. In top view the dorsal eminences are swept back, whereas in anterior or posterior view (from the front or from behind) they protrude outward and up. Among the defining features of the lateral osteoderms of Garzapelta is that the osteoderms of the cervical and anterior trunk region bear protrusions on the anterior edge of these spikes. Garzasuchus lacks an embayment at the back of the base of the dorsal eminence, which sets it apart from Lucasuchus and Desmatosuchus. The lateral flanges of Garzapelta are reduced and in the mid-trunk region they connect to the dorsal flange at an obtuse angle. This is similar to what is seen in most other aetosaurs, but clearly distinct from the derived desmatosuchines and typothoracines, in which the two elements connect at an angle of 90° or less. Further back, on the early osteoderms of the caudal armour, the lateral flange takes on a distinct semi-circular shape that is shared by paratypothoracines.

== Classification ==
Reyes and colleagues conducted both parsimony and Bayesian inference to recover the relationship between Garzapelta and other aetosaurs, furthermore conducting their analysis split into three versions. The team not only recovered the phylogenetic tree based on all the characters of the whole armour combined, but additionally did so exclusively for the paramedian and the lateral osteoderms, yielding conflicting results due to the mix of characters displayed across these elements. When only taking into account the paramedian osteoderms, Garzapelta is recovered as either being nested in a basal position within (parsimony) or just outside of Paratypothoracini. Focusing solely on the lateral osteoderms, meanwhile, results in drastically different results. Instead of being recovered within Aetosaurinae, Garzapelta now appears on the other branch of Aetosauria, the Stagonolepidoidea. Both parsimony and Bayesian inference recover it as being situated just outside of Desmatosuchini in those instances, though the resolution of the tree in the parsimony analysis is notably worse than in Bayesian inference. The results for the Bayesian consensus tree for the paramedian osteoderms are shown on the left, while those for the lateral osteoderms are depicted right.

- Aetosauria
  - Stagonolepidoidea
  - Aetosaurinae
    - Stenomyti
    - - - Aetosaurus
        - Coahomasuchus
      - Typothoracinae
        - - Apachesuchus
          - - Typothorax
            - Redondasuchus
        - - Garzapelta muelleri
          - Paratypothoracini
            - Rioarribasuchus
            - - - Kocurypelta
                - Venkatasuchus
              - - Tecovasuchus
                - Paratypothorax

- Aetosauria
  - Stagonolepidoidea
    - - Neoaetosauroides
      - - Calyptosuchus
        - - Scutarx
          - Adamanasuchus
    - - Stagonolepis robertsoni
      - - Stagonolepis olenkae
        - - Garzapelta muelleri
          - Desmatosuchini
            - Gorgetosuchus
            - - Longosuchus
              - - Lucasuchus
                - - Sierritasuchus
                  - Desmatosuchus
  - Aetosaurinae

The results recovered for including lateral and paramedian osteoderms together agree with those yielded by just looking at the lateral osteoderms, again placing it as a stagonolepidoid just outside of Desmatosuchini as shown above (right). Here too, the strict consensus is notably less well resolved than the Bayesian consensus, featuring a massive polytomy that includes almost all non-desmatosuchin aetosaurs.

The conflicting positions of Garzapelta had been known to science long before the taxon was named. The fact that the lateral osteoderms resemble those of desmatosuchins while the paramedian osteoderms resemble those of paratypothoracines poses the question whether or not Garzapelta was a desmatosuchine with paramedian osteoderms that evolved convergently to those of paratypothoracines or the other way around. The results of the overall phylogeny would support the former interpretation, which in turn would suggest that the paratypothoracine paramedian osteoderms are the ancestral condition, which was simply lost by all other aetosaurs and reversed in Garzapelta. However, this might not be the case. The interpretation that it was the lateral osteoderms that are the convergent element finds support in the way the lateral and paramedian osteoderms articulate with one another. Desmatosuchini are in part defined by the fact that the inner frontal corner of the lateral osteoderms overlaps the outer frontal corner of the paramedian osteoderms, forming a rigid point of articulation. Furthermore, the fact that the lateral osteoderms of the mid trunk region flex at an obtuse angle sets them apart from the 90° angle seen in Desmatosuchini and the strongly acute angle of paratypothoracines. Reyes and colleagues thus conclude that it is far more likely that Garzapelta was a typothoracine that exhibits convergent evolution with desmatosuchines, rather than the other way around. They further note that the fact it was nonetheless recovered as a desmatosuchine in the third phylogenetic analysis including all material suggests the dataset upon which aetosaur phylogenetics are built does not fully account for convergent evolution in the dorsal armour, meaning future analysis would have to be done with caution.
