= Kuttysuchus =

Kuttysuchus Temporal range: Late Triassic Norian–Rhaetian

Scientific classification
- Kingdom: Animalia
- Phylum: Chordata
- Class: Reptilia
- Clade: Archosauria
- Clade: Pseudosuchia
- Order: †Aetosauria
- Family: †Stagonolepididae
- Genus: †Kuttysuchus; Haldar, Ray & Bandyopadhyay, 2025
- Species: †K. minori

Binomial name
- †Kuttysuchus minori Haldar, Ray & Bandyopadhyay, 2025

Genus of reptile

Kuttysuchus is an extinct genus of typothoracine aetosaur from the Late Triassic Dharmaram Formation of India. It was described in 2025 on the basis of multiple isolated osteoderms that were nonetheless distinct in their appearance from not only the contemporary Venkatasuchus but also from other aetosaur taxa. The specific combination of characters suggests that Kuttysuchus was a member of the clade Paratypothoracini, with phylogenetic analysis indicating it to have been a basal member of the group. The genus is monotypic, only containing a single species. Kuttysuchus minori.

== History and naming ==
Kuttysuchus was described in early 2025 on the basis of a series of isolated paramedian osteoderms, with one almost complete bone serving as the holotype. All fossils stem from the sandstone-dominated lower unit of the Dharmaram Formation, located in the Pranhita–Godavari Basin of eastern India and thought to date from the mid or late Norian to the Rhaetian stages of the Triassic.

Kuttysuchus was named after Tharavat S. Kutty, who recovered the fossil material. The second part of the name derives from the Greek "suchus", which translates to "crocodile". The species name "minori" meanwhile references the small size of the osteoderms.

== Description ==
The only fossils found of Kuttysuchus are paramedian osteoderms, which form the much wider central two rows of armor that would have stretched across the animal's back in life. The smaller, triangular lateral osteoderms that would have attached to the side of the paramedian osteoderms have not been found. As with other aetosaurs, the paramedian osteoderms are wider than they are long, however, in this particular case the width:length radio is relatively low, with the width being less than twice the length. This, coupled with the strong transverse flexure of the osteoderms and some other features suggest that they formed the anterior or middle tail armor. Overall the osteoderms are rather thin, unlike those of desmatosuchins.

The front of each osteoderm forms the unornamented (smooth) anterior bar, which in articulation would slide beneath the previous osteoderm. In Kuttysuchus, the anterior bar is weakly raised. The medial edge of the anterior bar, meaning the one directed towards the midline of the animal, bears a short and pointed spur that is not as well developed as in some other taxa like Stagonolepis. Just before this projection the anterior bar thins slightly, which is known as scalloping. The inner (medial) edge of the osteoderms is straight and thin, the ancestral condition among aetosaurs, lacking the thickened articular surface that is characteristic of desmatosuchins.

The osteoderms bear a prominent dorsal eminence, a pyramid-shaped raised region that in Kuttysuchus is located much closer to the back edge of the osteoderm yet not touching the actual posterior margin, something that is a shared trait among paratypothoracins. Additionally, the dorsal eminence is described as mediolaterally elongated, meaning it is stretched in width. The shape of the eminence does help differentiate Kuttysuchus from other species, which may variable exhibit spike-like, bulbous knob-like, mound-like or even keel-like dorsal eminences, but is close in shape to that of Typothorax and Paratypothorax. However it is noted that the shape of the dorsal eminence varies based on the position of the osteoderm, with those closer to the tail being often more strongly developed before reducing in size again around the mid-caudal region. Unlike in the contemporary Venkatasuchus, the eminence in Kuttysuchus did not connect to a ridge, nor was the back edge of the osteoderm bevelled as in the former. The dorsal eminence forms somewhat of a center for the ornamentation of the osteoderm and various sharp, straight ridges as well as deep narrow grooves radiate outwards from the element, with small pits filling the spaces between them. Notably, the grooves do not contain any pits themselves, which sets them apart from those of Venkatasuchus, the other Dharmaram aetosaur. The ornamentation coupled with the shape of the dorsal eminence distinguish Kuttysuchus from members of Desmatosuchini, though they do bear some resemblance to non-desmatosuchin stagonolepoid aetosaurs.

The lower (ventral) surface of the osteoderms is smooth, lacing the pits and ridges that ornament the dorsal surface. Each osteoderm bears a prominent convex region that bears a weakly developed thickening, the so-called ventral strut. At the position of the dorsal eminence, the osteoderms arch or flex.

== Phylogeny ==
Though the lack of complete paramedian and lateral osteoderms can cause issues in phylogenetic analysis, Haldar, Ray and Bandyopadhyay have argued that the osteoderm armor of Kuttysuchus is complete and distinct enough to be used in order to determine the animals relationships within Aetosauria. Two analysis were run by the team, one based on the work of Haldar et al. (2023) and another based on Reyes et al. (2024), with the latter including the wildcard taxon Garzapelta, noted by Haldar and colleagues to be an example of an aetosaur whose incomplete nature causes conflicting phylogenetic positions.

Following resampling, the first analysis recovers Kuttysuchus as the earliest branching member of the Paratypothoracini, with the contemporary Venkatasuchus in a much more derived position within the group. Nevertheless, this topology is well supported by the study, meaning that it is likely that Kuttysuchus was a paratypothoracin. Though not as well resolved as the first analysis, the second phylogenetic analysis, which included Garzapelta, recovered similar results. It too placed Kuttysuchus at the base of Paratypothoracini, in this scenario in a polytomy with Kocurypelta. Here too the contemporary Venkatasuchus was found to be nested much deeper in the clade. Cladograms based on both analysis are shown below, the left following iteration 1 based on the dataset of Haldar et al. (2023) and the right following iteration 2 based on the dataset of Reyes et al. (2024).

- Aetosauria
  - Aetosauroides
  - - Stagonolepidoidea
    - Aetosaurinae
      - - Aetosaurus
        - Coahomasuchus
      - Typothoracinae
        - Apachesuchus
        - - Typothorax
          - Redondasuchus
        - Paratypothoracini
          - Kuttysuchus
          - - Rioarribasuchus
            - - Kocurypelta
              - - Venkatasuchus
                - - Tecovasuchus
                  - Paratypothorax

- Aetosauria
  - Aetosauroides
  - - Stenomyti
    - Stagonolepidoidea
    - Aetosaurinae
      - - Aetosaurus
        - Coahomasuchus
      - Typothoracinae
        - Apachesuchus
        - - Typothorax
          - Redondasuchus
        - Paratypothoracini
          - Kuttysuchus
          - Kocurypelta
          - - Rioarribasuchus
            - - Venkatasuchus
              - - Tecovasuchus
                - Paratypothorax

== Paleobiology ==
The fauna of the lower Dharmaram Formation is dominated by archosaurs, which in addition to Kuttysuchus included a phytosaur of the clade Mystriosuchinae, several sauropodomorphs including Jaklapallisaurus and even a neotheropod. At least two other aetosaurs are known from these sediments, one undescribed taxon similar to Desmatosuchus as well as the paratypothoracin Venkatasuchus. The presence of paratypothoracins has been used in previous studies to suggest that the lower Dharmaram Formation could be as old as the middle Norian.
