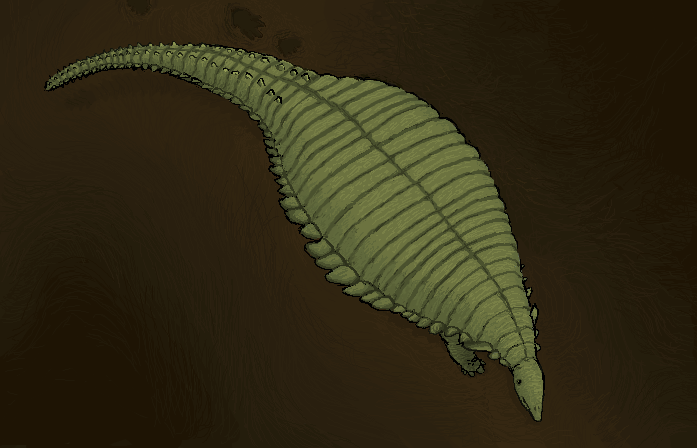
- Life restoration of Venkatasuchus armatus

Scientific classification
- Kingdom: Animalia
- Phylum: Chordata
- Class: Reptilia
- Clade: Pseudosuchia
- Order: †Aetosauria
- Family: †Stagonolepididae
- Tribe: †Paratypothoracini
- Genus: †Venkatasuchus; Haldar, Ray & Bandyopadhyay, 2023
- Species: †V. armatum

Binomial name
- †Venkatasuchus armatum Haldar, Ray & Bandyopadhyay, 2023

= Venkatasuchus =

Venkatasuchus Temporal range: Late Triassic 211–202 Ma

Genus of reptile

Venkatasuchus is an extinct genus of aetosaur from the Late Triassic Dharmaram Formation of India. It was described in 2023 on the basis of a series of associated osteoderms that formed the paramedian and lateral armour. Based on the osteoderms the carapace of Venkatasuchus was disc-shaped and very wide, with curved, horn-like elements along its sides. Phylogenetic analysis indicates that Venkatasuchus belonged to the subfamily Typothoracinae and more specifically the clade Paratypothoracini. Venkatasuchus is among the few aetosaurs recovered from the region that would later become Gondwana and lends credence to the idea that late Triassic India represented a connective hub between Laurasian and Gondwanan fauna. The genus is monotypic, meaning it only includes a single species, Venkatasuchus armatum.

== History and naming ==
Venkatasuchus is known from a series of osteoderms that have been recovered from the Late Triassic Lower Dharmaram Formation of India, more specifically from a locality near the village of Rampur within India's Adilabad district. The holotype (ISIR267/1–7) consists of eight associated pieces of bone of the paramedian armour, the armour that is placed along the midline of the animal's back, as well as the associated lateral osteoderms that attach to the sides of the former. In addition to the holotype set of bones, an isolated osteoderm (ISIR286) has also been recovered and referred to the genus based on its shared anatomy. However, there are some differences between the isolated element and the type material. Seeing as these differences may be related to age, sex or simple intraspecific variation, it is currently believed that ISIR286 belonged to a different individual.

The genus was named in honor of N. Venkata Raja Reddy, an enthusiast who helped with the discovery of fossils in the Pranhita-Godavari Basin. The second part of the name utilizes the Greek suffix "suchus", which is derived from the Egyptian deity Sobek and translates to "crocodile". The species name "armatum" simply means armoured.

== Description ==
Although little material of Venkatasuchus is known, it can be readily distinguished from other aetosaurs by the combination of features present on its osteoderms. Though only few traits observed in Venkatasuchus are deemed unique to this taxon, its the specific combination of features that sets it apart from its relatives.

The anterior bar of the osteoderms, the front-most section, is thick and weakly raised, taking up around 36% of the length of the element. A raised anterior bar is a trait that is almost universal among aetosaurs, yet absent in Desmatosuchus. The anterior bar also features a straight anteriomedial margin which is considered an autapomorphy, a derived trait not seen in any other members of the group. More broadly the margin of the entire medial section of the anterior bar is straight, but this is also shared by Paratypothorax. In contrast to the anterior bar, the posterior (back) end of the osteoderm is far more distinctive in its form, as it slopes and forms a bevel which is seen in Tecovasuchus, Kocurypelta and inconsistently among individuals of Paratypothorax andressorum while also serving to distinguish it from the contemporary Kuttysuchus. The underside of the osteoderm is generally smooth but preserves a pronounced ventral strut or keel that runs along the width of the bone.

When viewed from above each paramedian osteoderm is rectangular in shape with a straight edge where the lateral osteoderms connect. A similar straight or sigmoid lateral edge is only present in two other typothoracines, Tecovasuchus and Kocurypelta. Observing the osteoderms from the front or back meanwhile shows that they are arched and made up of two main regions that connect at an oblique angle where the dorsal eminence, a raised region that forms the center of ossification, is located.

The dorsal eminence forms the highest point of the osteoderms and is connected to a rounded ridge that spans the entire width of each osteoderm similar to Kocurypelta, running parallel to the posterior edge of the osteoderm. The eminence, which is surrounded by a distinct pattern of medium to large-sized pits and ridges that are collectively referred to as ornamentation, is also distinct in its location relative to the edges of the osteoderm. For example, similar to Desmatosuchus spurensis and Lucasuchus among others, the eminence is not in contact with the back edge of the osteoderm and it is further noted for being offset much further towards the midline than it is in other aetosaurs. Another prominent ridge is located in the posteromedial corner of the osteoderm.

As typical for members of the clade Typothoracinae, the paramedian osteoderms are extremely wide, more than four times wider than they are long. Since the dorsal eminence is offset towards the midline, thus also shifting the flexion of the paramedian osteoderm, the medial portion of the paramedian osteoderm is much shorter than the lateral section, making up only about 40% of the total width. In addition to being of phylogenetic value, the great width of the osteoderms recovered from Venkatasuchus indicate that they were trunk osteoderms rather than neck osteoderms, with Haldar, Ray and Bandyopadhyay interpreting as having formed the early to middle trunk armour. Taking this placement into account and applying proportions similar to those of other typothoracines would suggest that the complete armour would have been disc-like in its appearance.

Overall the lateral osteoderms, which are located to the side of the main paramedian row, are described as reduced and horn-like, their convex anterior margin making them appear to curve backwards. They can generally be divided into a dorsal (upper) and ventral (lower) flange, which are highly asymmetric with a much larger ventral flange like in Paratypothorax, Rioarribasuchus and Tecovasuchus. The dorsal flange is short and triangular while the ventral flange is long and more rectangular. The connection point between the two is strongly flexed, meaning they meet at an acute angle, tho the specific degree of flexion varies within the row. At least two groups of lateral osteoderms are identified, Group I in which the ratio between width and length is less than 1:1 and the flanges meet at an angle between 40 and 50°, and Group II in which the ratio between width and length is greater than 1:1 and the angle sits between 25 and 30°. Group I encompasses the first four preserved lateral osteoderms, while the remaining fall into Group II.

== Phylogeny ==
Multiple features of the osteoderms of Venkatasuchus indicate that it was a member of the Aetosaurinae, one of the major clades within Aetosauria and sister to Stagonolepidoidea. More specifically, Venkatasuchus falls within the Typothoracinae and is deeply nested in Paratypothoracini. Traits responsible for these results include the extreme width to length ratio, the narrow weakly raised anterior bar, medial offset of the dorsal eminence and the asymmetrical lateral osteoderms. Phylogenetic analysis performed as part of the type description suggested that the closest relative of Venkatasuchus may have been Kocurypelta silvestris from the Late Triassic of Poland. The 2025 description of Kuttysuchus also supported the placement of Venkatasuchus deep within Paratypothoracini, though closer to Tecovasaurus and Paratypothorax. Kocurypelta meanwhile was placed much more basally, closer to Kuttysuchus. Depicted below are the phylogenetic tree of the original description and analysis 2 from the description of Kuttysuchus.

- Aetosauria
  - Aetosauroides scagliai
  - Stagonolepididae
    - Stagonolepidoidea
    - Aetosaurinae
      - Coahomasuchus chathamensis
      - - Coahomasuchus kahleorum
        - - Aetosaurus ferratus
          - Typothoracinae
            - Apachesuchus heckerti
            - - - Redondasuchus rineharti
                - Typothorax coccinarum
              - Paratypothoracini
                - Rioarribasuchus chamaensis
                - - - Paratypothorax sp.
                    - Paratypothorax andressorum
                  - - Tecovasuchus chatterjeei
                    - - Kocurypelta silvestris
                      - Venkatasuchus armatum

- Aetosauria
  - Aetosauroides
  - - Stenomyti
    - Stagonolepidoidea
    - Aetosaurinae
      - - Aetosaurus
        - Coahomasuchus
      - Typothoracinae
        - Apachesuchus
        - - Typothorax
          - Redondasuchus
        - Paratypothoracini
          - Kuttysuchus
          - Kocurypelta
          - - Rioarribasuchus
            - - Venkatasuchus
              - - Tecovasuchus
                - Paratypothorax

== Stratigraphy and geography ==
The age of the Lower Dharmaram Formation has been a matter of debate which is only added to by the description of Venkatasuchus. Previously, Bandyopadhyay and Ray proposed that the Lower Dharmaram Formation was mid to late Norian in age based on the presence of a Nicrosaurus-like phytosaur and its correlation with the Löwenstein Formation in Germany, whereas other researchers suggests that the fauna postdates the Ischigualasto Formation, indicating its age to be late Norian to Rhaetian. The discovery of Venkatasuchus, a paratypothoracine, again pushes the potential age of the formation back in time, ranging from the early to middle Norian to Rhaetian, with the presence of a desmatosuchine aetosaur suggesting a middle Norian age at the least based on the stratigraphy of the Chinle Formation and Dockum Group.

Venkatasuchus also has major implications for the geography of aetosaurs. Generally, aetosaurs are best represented from Laurasian formations in Europe and North America, whereas their Gondwanan record is comparably poor with the exception of South America as the westernmost region. This makes Venkatasuchus one of the few known aetosaurs from eastern and central Gondwana. One hypothesis goes that aetosaur diversification was highly dependent on the Carnial Pluvial Event, much like the spread of metoposaurids and phytosaurs. Typothoracines most likely appeared a little later, during the early Norian, while diversifying during the middle Norian to Rhaetian. Geographically, aetosaurs can be found in three major clusters. High latitudes in the south featuring early diverging forms, high latitudes in the north featuring late diverging forms and the taxa clustering in low latitudes of North America, Morocco and India which feature a mix of early and late diverging taxa. These clusterings of aetosaur diversity overlap with those of metoposaurids and phytosaurs with the exception of the more southern latitudes, though collection bias could be a factor at play.

India in particular is known to display a mix of Laurasian and Gondwanan fauna during the Late Triassic, with both Venkatasuchus and the undescribed phytosaur having Laurasian affinities, while the dinosaurs of the region are more closely allied with Gondwanan groups. This may have been highly influenced by the position of India at the time, with the slow breakup of the supercontinent Pangea opening land bridges and removing environmental barriers to allow for the migration of animal groups into the region which was not possible in other parts of the world.

== Paleoecology ==
The Lower Dharmaram Formation represents an archosaur dominated environment and in addition to Venkatasuchus was the home to a wide variety of animals. This includes dinosaurs such as the sauropodomorph Jaklapallisaurus and an undescribed neotheropod as well as a wide range of pseudosuchians including an undescribed phytosaur, originally thought have been similar to Nicrosaurus but later identified as a mystriosuchine. Two other aetosaurs have been identified from the Dharmaram Formation, the basal paratypothoracin Kuttysuchus and an undescribed species that more closely resembles the American Desmatosuchus. While archosaurs were plentiful, including groups of biostratigraphic importance like phytosaurs and aetosaurs, animals like metoposaurid temnospondyls and rhynchosaurs are as of yet unknown from the region.
