= Kryphioparma =

Kryphioparma Temporal range: Late Triassic (Adamanian), 223–218 Ma

Scientific classification
- Kingdom: Animalia
- Phylum: Chordata
- Class: Reptilia
- Clade: Archosauria
- Clade: Pseudosuchia
- Order: †Aetosauria
- Family: †Stagonolepididae
- Subfamily: †Typothoracinae
- Genus: †Kryphioparma; Reyes, Parker & Heckert, 2023
- Species: †K. caerula

Binomial name
- †Kryphioparma caerula Reyes, Parker & Heckert, 2023

Genus of extinct reptiles

Kryphioparma is an extinct genus of aetosaur from the Late Triassic Blue Mesa Member of the Chinle Formation, Arizona. It is the oldest known member of the subfamily Typothoracinae, and is currently only known from five isolated and incomplete dorsal osteoderms. Regardless, said osteoderms show a clear mix of features that do not match any other known aetosaur and were thus used as the basis for a new genus and species in 2023. The genus is monotypic, only including a single species, Kryphioparma caerula.

== History and naming ==
Kryphioparma is currently only known from a few isolated osteoderm remains collected at the Placerias Quarry and Petrified Forest National Park. Each of these localities, which are located within the Late Triassic Blue Mesa Member of the Chinle Formation, yielded two osteoderms. The localities are thought to correspond to the early middle Norian, the second to last stage of the Triassic. More specifically, the Blue Mesa Member has been dated to between 223 and 218 million years old, putting them within the Adamanian interval. An additional lateral osteoderm from the same horizons was referred to Kryphioparma in 2024.

The genus name is composed of the words "kryphoides", which is Greek for "mysterious", and "parma", a type of Ancient Roman shield. This combination was chosen to represent the extensive armor of these animals, and highlight how little is known about this taxon due to its fragmentary nature. The species name derives from "cearulus", the Latin word for "blue", representative of the Blue Mesa Member.

== Description ==
The known osteoderms of Kryphioparma are part of the paramedial armor, meaning that in life they would have formed the topmost row of armor protecting the animal's torso. This is determined as they are not square like those that would cover the belly, nor stretched like those located on the sides or tail of the animal would be. Comparison with aetosaurs that preserve more complete sets of armor then allowed to more precisely place the material along the body, which would suggest they came from either the trunk, the hip or the front most part of the tail region.

The osteoderms are covered by large, oblong pits which are randomly oriented across the bones surface, clearly setting them apart from those of the related Typothorax and the phytosaur Redondasuchus. In particular, what sets them apart from Typothorax is that the pits are much more widely placed, whereas in the latter they are densely spaced on the surface. On the right side towards the front of each individual osteoderm, the bone forms a noticeably protrusion referred to as the anterior bar, which is also seen in most aetosaurs but absent in Desmatosuchus. The element is overall thickened and on the under side it bulges out, forming the so-called ventral strut. The back of the osteoderm is ornamented by grooves, similar to Tecovasuchus and Paratypothorax. Although none of the known osteoderms are complete, it is thought that the ratio between width and length was much higher than in stagonolepidoids and more closely matched the proportions of other typothoracines.

== Classification ==
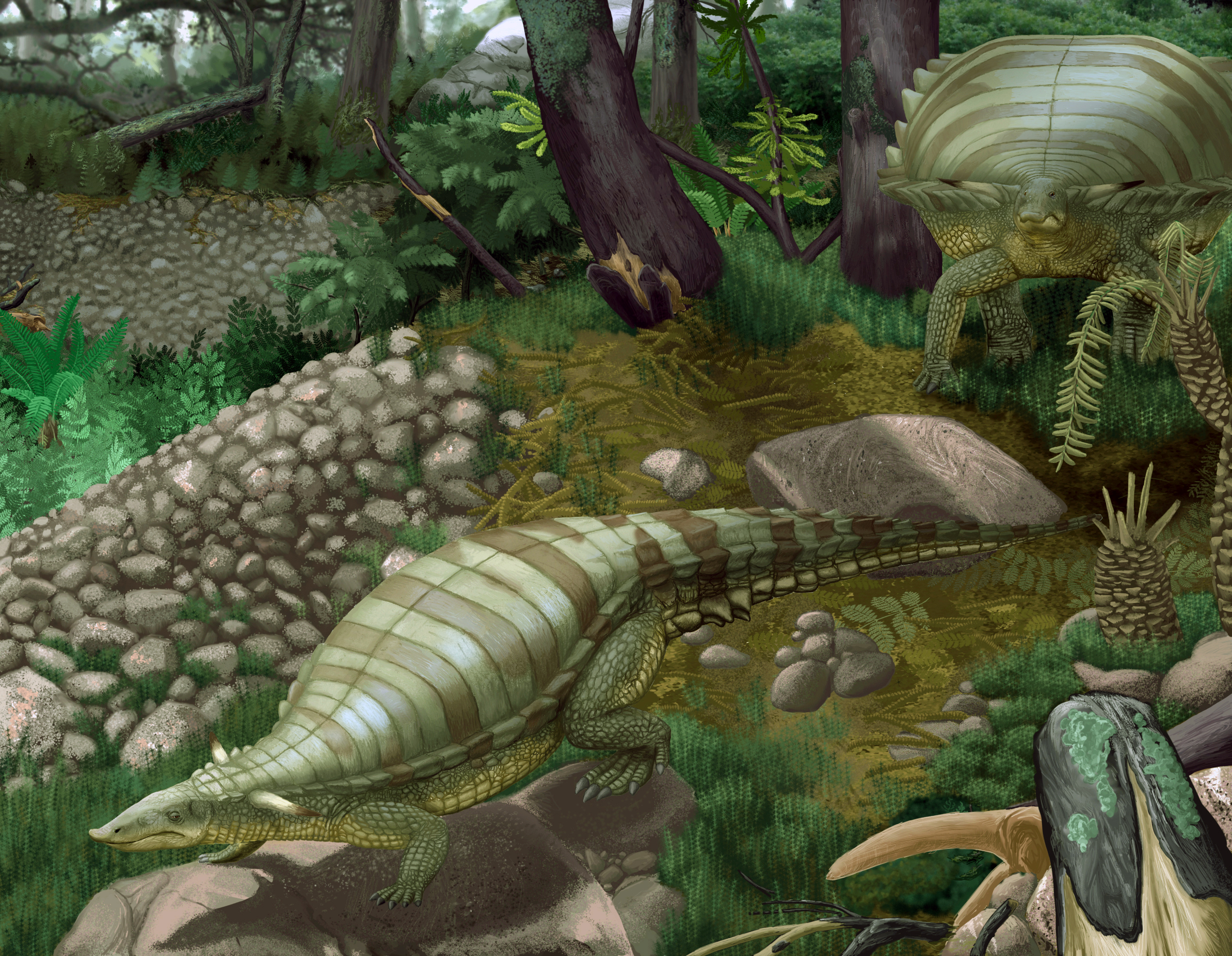
Speculative life restoration of the related Typothorax

The original describers of Kryphioparma refrained from including it in a phylogenetic analysis, due to the specimens' incomplete nature. However, they noted that the anatomy of the osteoderms allowed for its placement in the broader context of aetosaur clades. Specifically, the presumed width:length ratio, well-developed anterior bar and ventral strut all suggest that it was a typothoracine, a relative of taxa such as Typothorax, Paratypothorax and Tecovasaurus.

In their 2024 description of an additional Kryphioparma osteoderm, Parker and Haldar included the taxon in a phylogenetic analysis and found support for the previous hypothesis that Kryphioparma represents a member of the Typothoracinae. Their results are displayed in the cladogram below:

- Aetosauria
  - Aetosauroides
  - Stagonolepididae
    - Stagonolepidoidea
    - Aetosaurinae
      - - Aetosaurus
        - Coahomasuchus spp.
      - Typothoracinae
        - Paratypothoracini
        - - Apachesuchus
          - - Kryphioparma
            - - Redondasuchus
              - Typothorax

== Paleobiology ==
Remains of Kryphioparma are known from the Placerias Quarry, which preserves a rich fauna composed of several different aetosaur species. This suggests that Kryphioparma may have coexisted with animals such as Desmatosuchus spurensis, Desmatosuchus smalli, Calyptosuchus wellesi and an animal tentatively assigned to "Tecovasuchus". The identity of this last aetosaur is currently however uncertain, and until further material is found it cannot be confidently assigned to any genus in particular. The Thunderstorm Ridge locality within the Petrified Forest National Park is similarly diverse, likewise preserving Desmatosuchus, Calyptosuchus wellesi and Tecovasuchus chatterjeei.
