= Lower Dharmaram Formation =

Geologic formation in India

- Stratigraphic range: Latest Norian–Rhaetian; ~211–202 Ma
- Type: Geological formation
- Unit of: Gondwana Group
- Underlies: Upper Dharmaram Formation
- Overlies: Upper Maleri Formation

Lithology
- Primary: Sandstone, Mudstone

Location
- Coordinates: 19.2°N 79.6°E
- Approximate paleocoordinates: 32.3°S 36.1°E
- Region: Telangana
- Country: India
- Extent: Pranhita–Godavari Basin

Type section
- Named for: Dharmaram
- Lower Dharmaram Formation (India)

The Lower Dharmaram Formation is a sedimentary rock formation found in Telangana, India. It is one of the formations of the Pranhita–Godavari Basin. It is of latest Norian and Rhaetian ages (Upper Triassic), and is notable for its fossils of early dinosaurs.

== Vertebrate fauna ==
cf. Paratypothorax, cf. Nicrosaurus, fragmentary remains of sauropodomorphs (ISI R279, 280, 281) and neotheropods (ISI R283) have also been recovered from it.

| Color key: Taxon / Reclassified taxon / Taxon falsely reported as present / Dubious taxon or junior synonym / Ichnotaxon / Ootaxon / Morphotaxon | Notes; Uncertain or tentative taxa are in small text; ~~crossed out~~ taxa are discredited. |

=== Saurischians ===
Saurischians reported from the Lower Dharmaram Formation
| Genus | Species | Location | Stratigraphic position | Material | Notes | Images |
|---|---|---|---|---|---|---|
| Jaklapallisaurus | J. assymetrica | Telangana | | "ISI R279, distal end of right femur." | A unaysaurid, also found in the Upper Maleri Formation. | |
| Sauropodomorpha | Indeterminate | Telangana | | "ISIR 280, astragalus." | An Indeterminate Sauropodomorpha. | |
| Neotheropoda | Indeterminate | Telangana | | "ISIR 283, incomplete femur." | An Indeterminate Neotheropod. | |

=== Pseudosuchians ===
Pseudosuchians reported from the Lower Dharmaram Formation
| Genus | Species | Location | Stratigraphic position | Material | Notes | Images |
|---|---|---|---|---|---|---|
| Kuttysuchus | K. minor | Telangana | | | A typothoracine aetosaur. | |
| Primisuchus | P. gillettei | Telangana | | | A leptosuchomorph mystriosuchine | |
| Venkatasuchus | V. armatus | Telangana | | | A typothoracine aetosaur | |
| cf. Paratypothorax | sp. | Telangana | | | A typothoracine aetosaur. | |
| cf. Nicrosaurus | sp. | Telangana | | | A mystriosuchin parasuchid. | |
| cf. Desmantosuchus | sp. | Telangana | | | A typothoracine aetosaur. | |
| Desmatosuchinae indet. | Indeterminate | Telangana | | | Indeterminate typothoracine aetosaurs. | |

== Correlations ==
The formation has been correlated with the Lower Elliot Formation (Karoo Basin) and Forest Sandstone of Africa, the Caturrita Formation of the Paraná Basin in Brazil, the Laguna Colorada and Los Colorados Formations (Ischigualasto-Villa Unión Basin) of Argentina, the Chinle Formation of North America, the Trossingen Formation of the Keuper of Germany, and the Nam Phong Formation of Thailand.

== See also ==
- List of dinosaur-bearing rock formations
