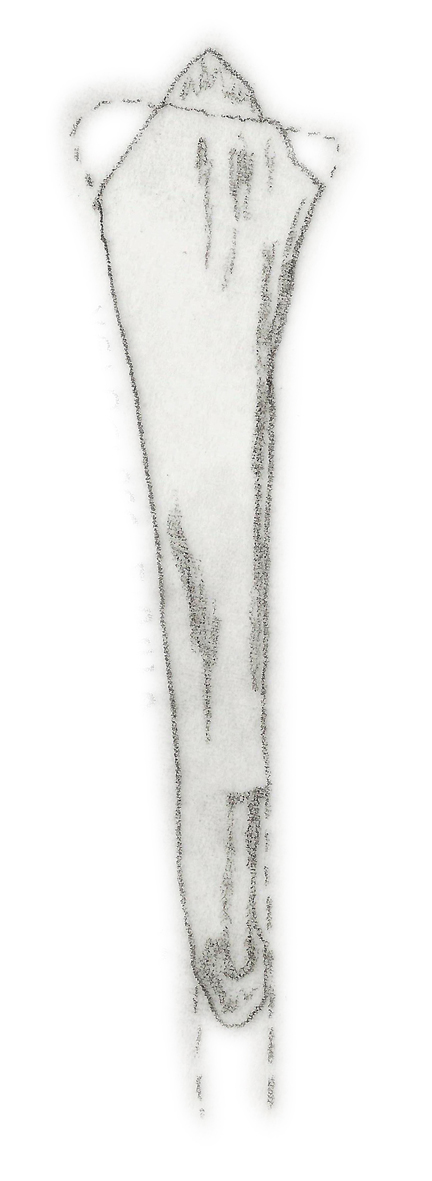
- Fibula of the holotype

Scientific classification
- Kingdom: Animalia
- Phylum: Chordata
- Class: Reptilia
- Clade: Dinosauria
- Clade: Saurischia
- Clade: Theropoda (?)
- Genus: †Velocipes; Huene, 1932
- Species: †V. guerichi

Binomial name
- †Velocipes guerichi Huene, 1932

= Velocipes =

Velocipes Temporal range: Late Triassic, 221.5–205.6 Ma Norian

Extinct genus of dinosaurs

Velocipes (meaning "quick foot") is a genus of saurischian dinosaur from the Late Triassic that may have been a theropod. Its fossils were found in the Norian-aged Lissauer Breccia of southern Poland. Upon discovery, Velocipes was thought to have been a coelurosaur, but more recent studies have shown that Velocipes was probably a basal theropod or dinosauriform.

== History and taxonomy ==
The type species, V. guerichi, was first described by Huene in 1932 as a coelurosaur, based on GPIM UH no. 252, which consists of the proximal portion of a very poorly preserved fibula that was discovered in the Lissauer Breccia of Kocury, southern Poland by Georg Gürich around 1884; the bone was described but not named in 1884. The bone was damaged during the Second World War and was thought to have been destroyed until it was rediscovered in 2012 by D. Mazurek. In 1956, von Huene placed Velocipes in the Halticosauridae, which has since become monotypic to only include Halticosaurus. In 1984, Samuel Paul Welles considered Velocipes to be synonymous with Liliensternus.

A later paper, published in 2000 by Rauhut and Hungerbuhler, claimed that the only specimen of this animal was not well preserved enough to be confidently identified as part of a fibula, and classified the genus as an "indeterminate vertebrate". In 2004, Ronald Tykoski and Timothy Rowe listed Velocipes as a possible ceratosaur or coelophysoid. Weishampel et al. (2004) also listed Velocipes as a possible ceratosaur.

However, an SVP abstract reviewing putative dinosauriform remains from the Triassic of southern Poland confirmed the original theropod classification of Velocipes by von Huene, which was elaborated in detail in a 2017 paper. The authors considered Velocipes to have been a basal neotheropod or a taxon closely related to this clade.

== Description ==
The surviving portion of the fibula is 16.4 cm long and after comparing the bone to other related theropods, it is believed that the full fibula was roughly 30-35 cm in length. The medial surface is slightly concave, suggesting that Velocipes may have been a neotheropod, and on the lateral surface of the bone there is a clear ridge about 52 mm long and about 5 mm high.

It is assumed that, based on the estimated size of the fibula, Velocipes may have reached up to 3 metres (9.8 ft) long and weighed around 50 kilograms (110 lb), although this can only be speculated as only one specimen of Velocipes is currently known to exist.

== Paleoecology ==
Velocipes would have been contemporaneous with the aetosaur genus Kocurypelta, an indeterminate species of lungfish, and the stem-turtle Proterochersis cf. porebensis.
