= Lissauer Breccia =

Geologic formation in Poland

- Stratigraphic range: Norian, 221.5–205.6 Ma Late Triassic
- Type: Geological formation

Lithology
- Primary: Breccia

Location
- Coordinates: 50°46′40″N 18°25′37″E
- Region: southern Poland, near Kocury
- Country: Poland
- Lissauer Breccia (Poland)

The Lissauer Breccia, sometimes referred to as the Kocury Locality, is a Norian geologic formation that is part of the larger Keuper limestone, which dominates across most of west and central Europe. Dinosaur remains diagnostic to the genus level are among the fossils that have been recovered from the formation. The site was studied in 1932 and was later forgotten and not explored until excavations began in 2012, and the Lissauer Breccia was re-described in 2021.

== Fossil content ==
- Kocurypelta silvestris
- cf. Metaceratodus sp.
- Proterochersis cf. porebensis
- Velocipes guerichi

== See also ==
- List of dinosaur-bearing rock formations
  - List of stratigraphic units with few dinosaur genera
