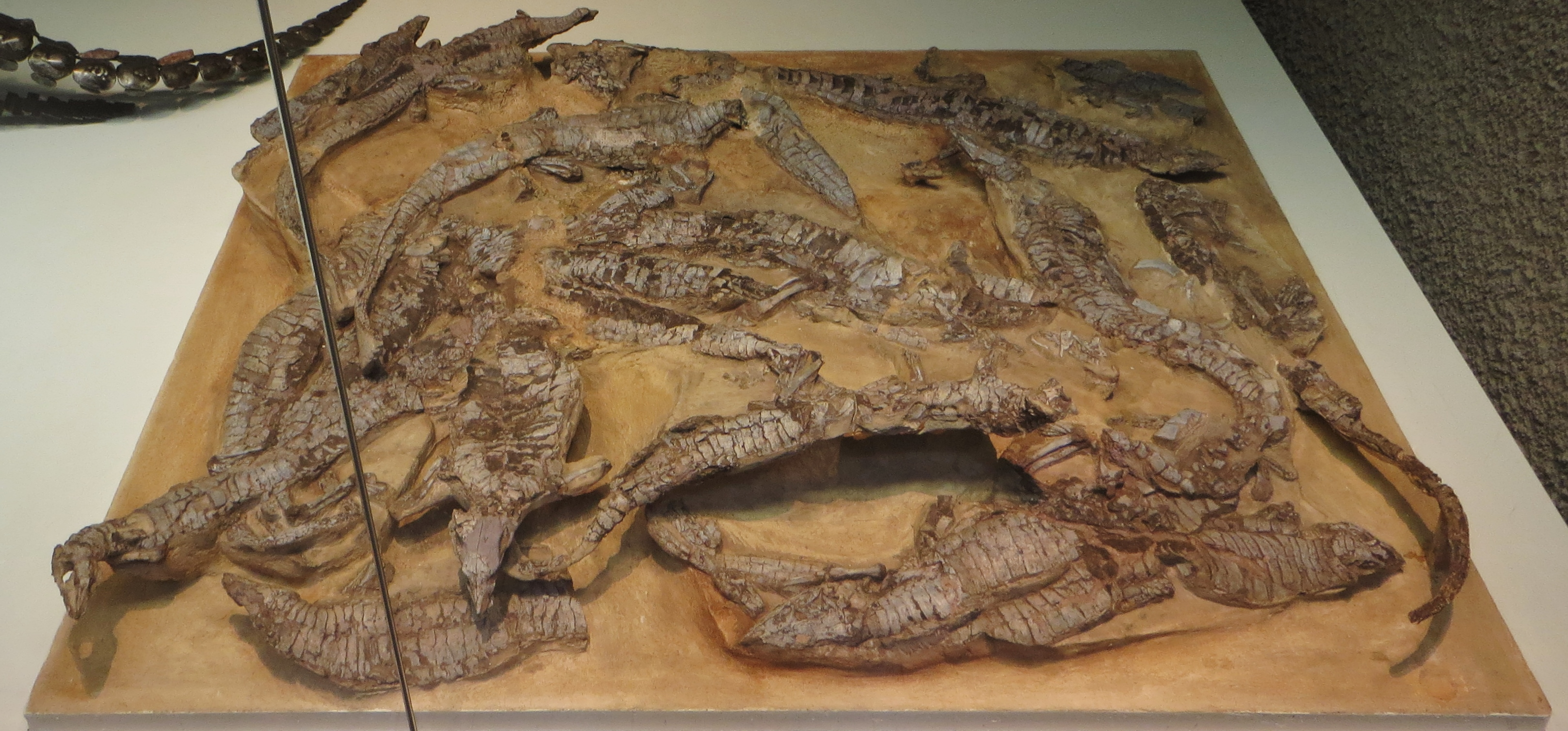
- A bonebed of Aetosaurus
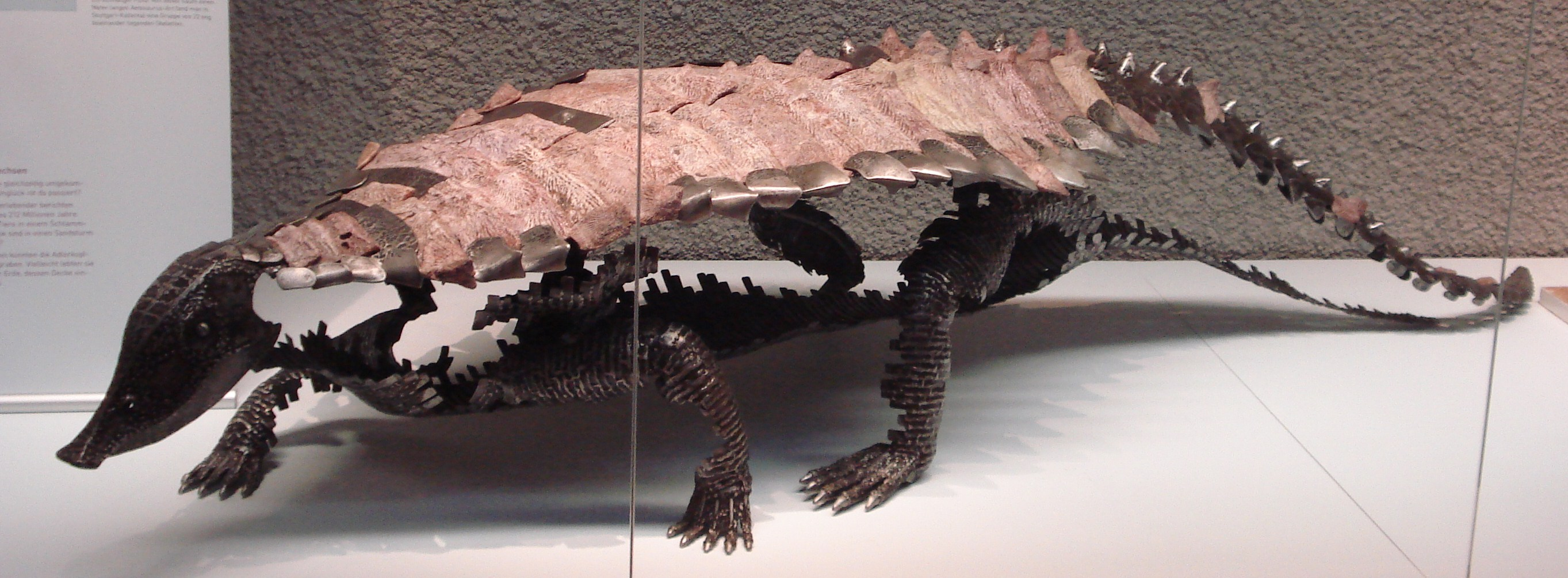
- Paratypothorax, a typothoracine

Scientific classification
- Kingdom: Animalia
- Phylum: Chordata
- Class: Reptilia
- Clade: Pseudosuchia
- Order: †Aetosauria
- Family: †Stagonolepididae
- Subfamily: †Aetosaurinae; Heckert and Lucas, 2000

Clades
- †Aetosaurus; †Coahomasuchus; †Stenomyti; †Typothoracinae; †Apachesuchus; †Chilenosuchus?; †Gorgetosuchus; †Kryphioparma; †Redondasuchus; †Typothorax; †Paratypothoracini; †Kocurypelta; †Kuttysuchus; †Paratypothorax; †Rioarribasuchus; †Tecovasuchus; †Venkatasuchus

= Aetosaurinae =

Aetosaurinae Temporal range: Late Triassic

Extinct subfamily of reptiles

Aetosaurinae is one of the two main clades of aetosaurs, the other being Desmatosuchia. It is a stem-based taxon defined as all aetosaurs more closely related to Aetosaurus than Desmatosuchus. Aetosaurinae currently comprises Aetosaurus, similar forms such as Coahomasuchus and Stenomyti, and the widespread and successful aetosaur clade Typothoracinae.

== Previous usage ==
Aetosaurinae was originally named in 2000, as a subfamily solely including Aetosaurus, which was assumed to be the earliest-diverging aetosaur. In 2007, it was extended to include the subfamily Typothoracinae as well as various basal aetosaurs which were not clearly within Desmatosuchinae. These proposed non-typothoracine aetosaurines included Coahomasuchus, Neoaetosauroides, Aetosauroides, Stagonolepis robertsoni, and "Stagonolepis" (Calyptosuchus) wellesi. As a subfamily containing practically all non-desmatosuchine aetosaurs, Aetosaurinae was poorly supported. It was diagnosed by a singly synapomorphy: the dorsal eminence of each paramedian osteoderm was offset medially.

A phylogenetic study in 2012 found that this widest usage of Aetosaurinae was paraphyletic. Aetosaurus was recovered as the basal-most stagonolepidid, with other non-typothoracisine aetosaurines placed as successively more derived taxa leading up to a clade containing Desmatosuchinae and Typothoracisinae. In this phylogeny, all aetosaurines except for Aetosaurus were more closely related to Desmatosuchus than they are to Aetosaurus. As a result, the clade Aetosaurinae would only include Aetosaurus.

== Current usage ==
More recent data and phylogenies have brought Aetosaurinae back into usage, albeit in a more restricted form. A 2016 study once again considered Typothoracinae to be closer to Aetosaurus than to desmatosuchines. Therefore, Typothoracinae would lie within Aetosaurinae, making Aetosaurinae a valid and non-monotypic clade once more. Newly described or redescribed genera such as Stenomyti and Coahomasuchus have also been incorporated into Aetosaurinae. Aetosaurinae is the sister taxon to Desmatosuchia, a new clade including desmatosuchines and their relatives, such as Stagonolepis.

Relative to desmatosuchians, aetosaurines have proportionally shorter and more lightly built skulls, as well as several other distinctive traits. The orbit is large and circular, while the supratemporal fenestrae are fairly small. This also means that the parietals are wider than the frontals on the skull roof, at least in early-diverging genera such as Aetosaurus and Stenomyti. The nares are similar in size or smaller than the orbit. The snout tapers to a point, without the "shovel-shaped" premaxilla extensions found in Stagonolepis and Desmatosuchus.
