= Kocury, Opole Voivodeship =

Kocury
- Village
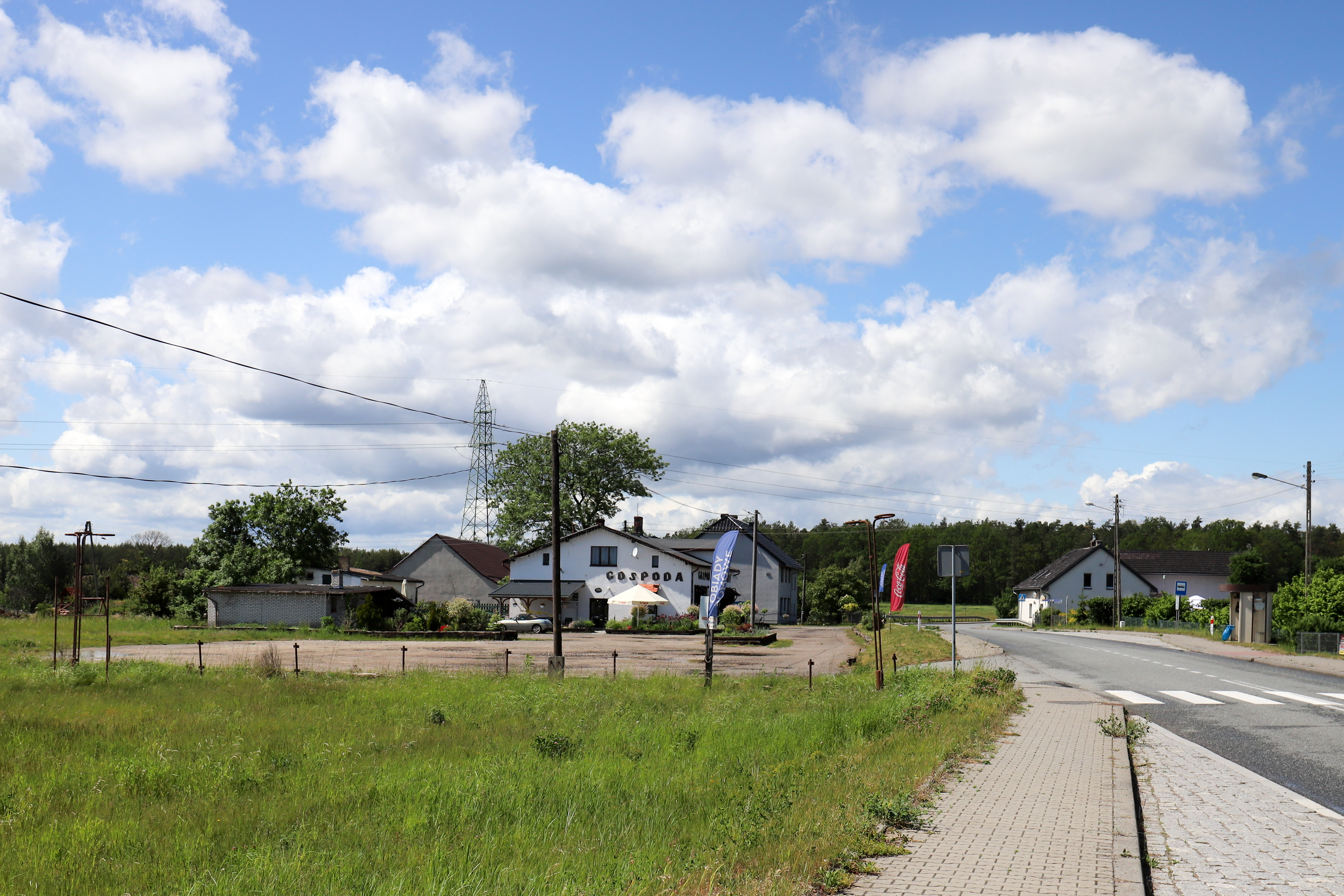

- Location within Poland
- Coordinates: 50°46′40″N 18°25′37″E
- Country: Poland
- Voivodeship: Opole
- County: Olesno
- Gmina: Dobrodzień
- Population: 140

Kocury [kɔˈt͡surɨ] is a village in the administrative district of Gmina Dobrodzień, within Olesno County, Opole Voivodeship, in south-western Poland.

== Geology ==
Late Triassic (Norian)-aged rocks forming part of the Lissauer Breccia outcrop near the village of Kocury.
