= Stenomyti =

Stenomyti Temporal range: Late Triassic

Scientific classification
- Domain: Eukaryota
- Kingdom: Animalia
- Phylum: Chordata
- Class: Reptilia
- Clade: Archosauria
- Clade: Pseudosuchia
- Order: †Aetosauria
- Family: †Stagonolepididae
- Subfamily: †Aetosaurinae
- Genus: †Stenomyti; Small & Martz, 2013

Type species
- †Stenomyti huangae Small & Martz, 2013

Extinct genus of reptiles

Stenomyti is an extinct genus of small aetosaur. It contains a single species, Stenomyti huangae, which is known from a skull, postcranial skeleton and other referred material from the Late Triassic Chinle Formation, Eagle Basin of Colorado, United States. Stenomyti is distinguished from other aetosaurs by eight autapomorphies (unique traits), however its osteoderms are nearly identical to those of Aetosaurus which suggests that osteoderms are not always reliable taxonomic indicators for aetosaurs. Based on its osteoderms, and other shared cranial characters with Aetosaurus, it was suggested that these taxa are closely related and lie outside the clade containing Typothoracisinae and Desmatosuchinae.
