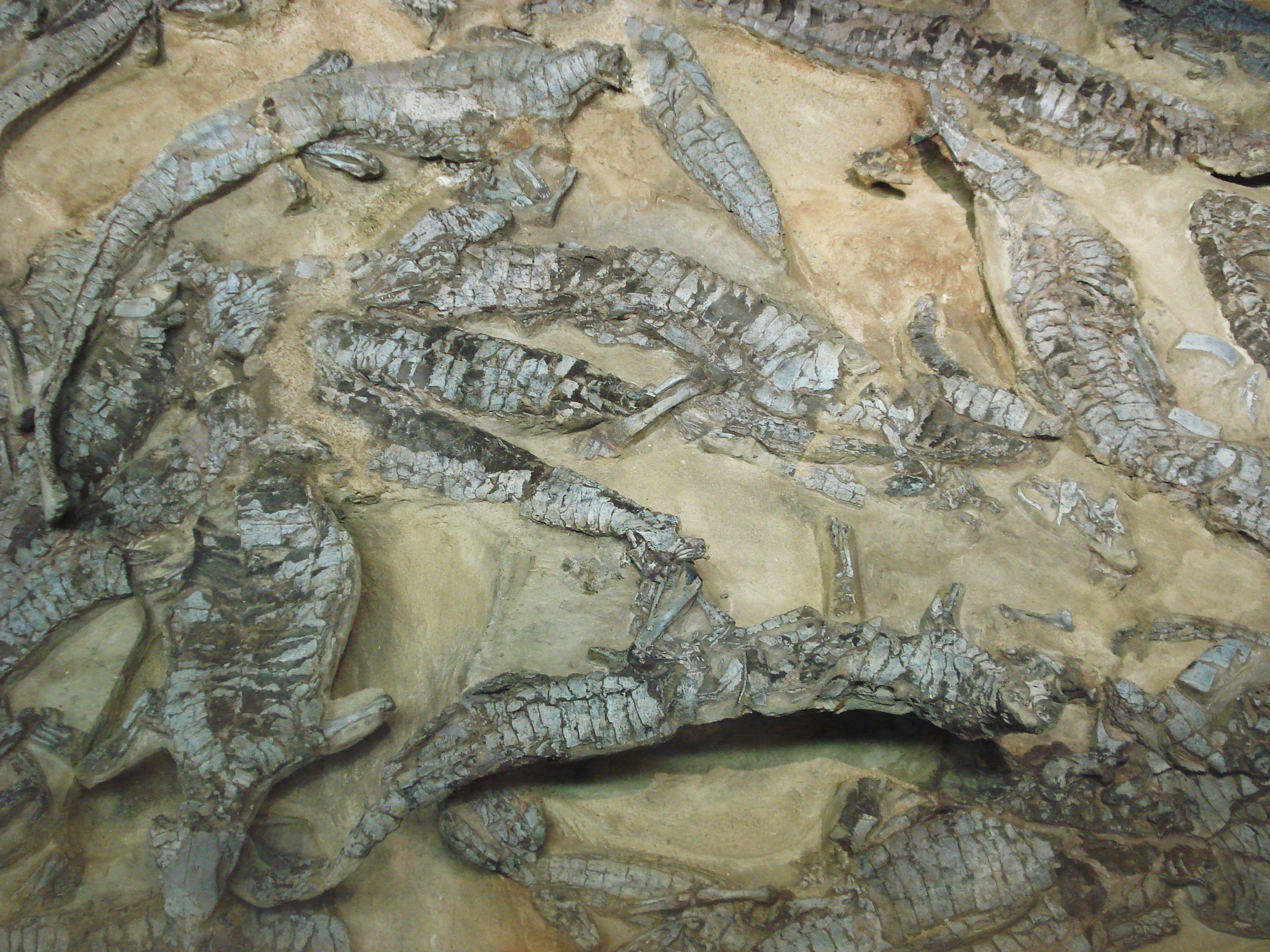
- Assemblage of fossil A. ferratus

Scientific classification
- Kingdom: Animalia
- Phylum: Chordata
- Class: Reptilia
- Clade: Pseudosuchia
- Order: †Aetosauria
- Family: †Stagonolepididae
- Subfamily: †Aetosaurinae
- Genus: †Aetosaurus; Fraas, 1877

Species
- †A. arcuatus (Marsh, 1896); †A. crassicauda Fraas, 1907; †A. ferratus Fraas, 1877 (type)

Synonyms
- Stegomus arcuatus Marsh, 1896

= Aetosaurus =

Aetosaurus Temporal range: Late Triassic, Carnian–Norian

Extinct genus of reptiles

Aetosaurus is an extinct genus of pseudosuchian reptile belonging to the order Aetosauria. It is generally considered to be the most primitive aetosaur. Three species are currently recognized: A. ferratus, the type species from Germany and Italy; A. crassicauda from Germany; and A. arcuatus from eastern North America. Additional specimens referred to Aetosaurus have been found in the Chinle Group of the southwestern United States, and the Fleming Fjord Formation of Greenland. Specimens of Aetosaurus occur in Norian-age strata.

== Description ==
Aetosaurus was a small, primitive aetosaur. Unlike more derived aetosaurs such as Desmatosuchus or Typothorax, the carapace was long and narrow and lacked spikes. The paramedian scutes that covered the back (with one row on each side of the vertebrae) are considerably wider than they are long. The lateral scutes, which are beneath the paramedian and formed a row on either side of the animal, do not bear any spikes or other projections.

== Behaviour ==
A 2023 study based on a fossil assemblage found in Kaltental, suggested that juvenile A. ferratus were likely gregarious animals, possibly to increase their chances of survival and to deter predators.

== Species ==
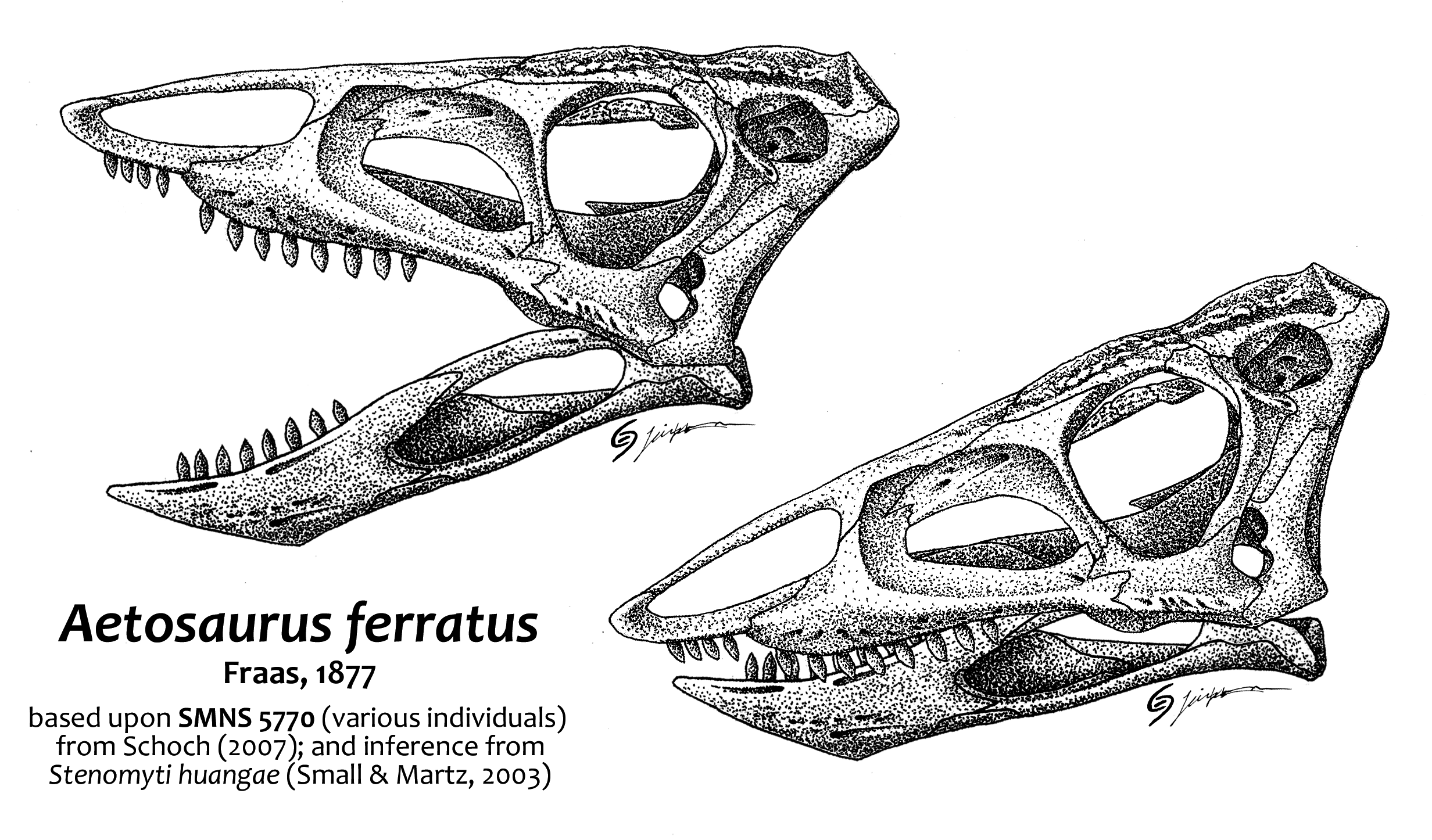
Reconstructed skull of A. ferratus

Aetosaurus was first named, with the description of the type species A. ferratus, in 1877 by German paleontologist Oscar Fraas. At the time, Aetosaurus was known from 22 articulated skeletons that had been found in the Lower Stubensandtein of Germany. Thirty years later, Fraas' son Eberhard described a second species, A. crassicauda, also from Germany. A. crassicauda can be distinguished from A. ferratus by its larger size; A. crassicauda reached a maximum length of 150 centimetres (59 in) while A. ferratus reached a length of up to 90 centimetres (35 in).

In addition to the Stubensandtein in Germany, A. ferratus is also known from the Calcare di Zorzino Formation in Cene, Italy. Specimens of Aetosaurus that have been recovered from the Fleming Fjord Formation in Greenland likely represent A. ferratus. Some material from the Chinle Group in the southwestern United States probably represent A. ferratus, as well.

In 1998, the genus Stegomus was synonymized with Aetosaurus. In 1896, paleontologist Othniel Charles Marsh named Stegomus arcuatus from a cast of an aetosaur known as YPM 1647 from the New Haven Formation in the Fair Haven Heights neighborhood of New Haven. This cast consisted of the dorsal carapace. Several other casts preserving the surface of the skull and tail have been found in the Passaic Formation of Hunterdon and Somerset counties, New Jersey and an outcrop of the Lower Sanford Formation at the Triangle Brick Co. Quarry in Durham County, North Carolina. Stegomus arcuatus was found to be synonymous with Aetosaurus on the basis of several similarities, including a lack of spikes and a distinctive radial pattern of grooves on some of the caudal scutes.

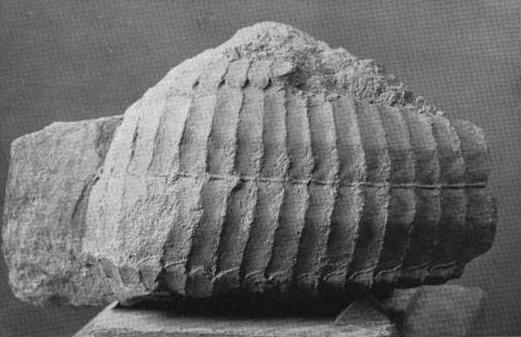
Photograph of YPM 1647, a specimen of A. arcuatus

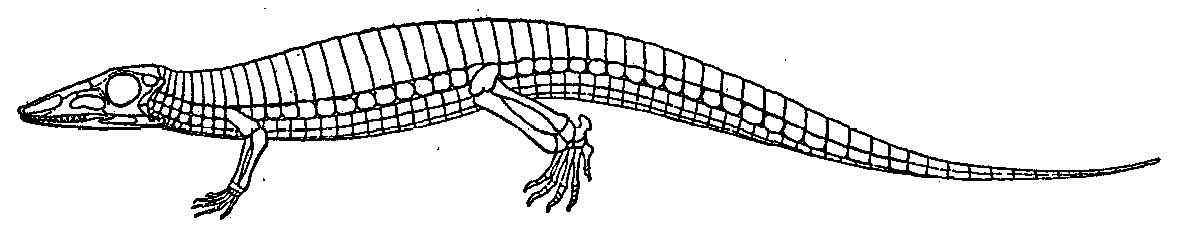
Skeletal drawing of A. ferratus by Marsh

A. arcuatus has paramedian scutes that are much wider than they are long, even in comparison to other species of Aetosaurus. There is very little pitting on the surface of the scutes, although the porosity of the sandstone that makes up the casts has been mistaken for pitting. The tail narrows significantly past the base. The carapace is "waisted", meaning that it narrows in front of the pelvis.

The following cladogram is simplified after an analysis presented by Julia B. Desojo, Martin D. Ezcurra and Edio E. Kischlat (2012).

- Aetosauria
  - Aetosauroides scagliai
  - Stagonolepididae
    - Aetosaurus ferratus
    - Coahomasuchus kahleorum
    - - Neoaetosauroides engaeus
      - - Calyptosuchus wellesi
        - Stagonolepis robertsoni
        - - Aetobarbakinoides brasiliensis
          - - Typothoracisinae
              - - Typothorax
                - Redondasuchus
              - Paratypothoracisini
                - Tecovasuchus chatterjeei
                - - Rioarribasuchus chamaensis
                  - Paratypothorax andressorum
            - Desmatosuchinae
              - Sierritasuchus macalpini
              - - Longosuchus meadei
                - - Lucasuchus hunti
                  - - Acaenasuchus geoffreyi
                    - Desmatosuchus
                      - Desmatosuchus haplocerus
                      - Desmatosuchus smalli
