= Kocurypelta =

Kocurypelta Temporal range: Late Triassic, 221.5–205.6 Ma

Scientific classification
- Kingdom: Animalia
- Phylum: Chordata
- Class: Reptilia
- Clade: Archosauria
- Clade: Pseudosuchia
- Order: †Aetosauria
- Family: †Stagonolepididae
- Genus: †Kocurypelta; Czepiński et al., 2021
- Species: †K. silvestris

Binomial name
- †Kocurypelta silvestris Czepiński et al., 2021

Extinct genus of reptiles

Kocurypelta is an extinct genus of paratypothoracin aetosaur from the Late Triassic (Norian)-aged Lissauer Breccia of southern Poland. Only the type species is known, which is K. silvestris, described by Czepiński et al. in 2021.

== Discovery and naming ==
The holotype (ZPAL V.66/4), which consists of part of the maxilla, and referred material (three dorsal paramedial plates and a ventral plate fragment), was found in a layer of the Lissauer Breccia, of which the location was believed to have been lost after the formation was studied by Friedrich von Huene while describing Velocipes in 1932, near Kocury, during excavations that began in 2012, that re-discovered and re-explored the formation. The remains were described as the new species Kocurypelta silvestris in 2021.

== Description ==
According to Czepiński et al. (2021), Kocurypelta is characterized by autapomorphies of the maxilla: an elongated edentulous posterior portion longer than 80% of the posterior maxillary process, a short medial shelf restricted to the posterior portion of the bone, an anteriorly unroofed maxillary accessory cavity, and the lack of a distinct groove for choanal recess on the anteromedial surface of the bone.

== Paleoecology ==
Kocurypelta would have been contemporaneous with the theropod dinosaur Velocipes, an indeterminate species of lungfish (cf. Metaceratodus sp.) and an indeterminate species of stem-turtle from the Proterochersidae family (Proterochersis cf. porebensis).
