= Rioarribasuchus =

Rioarribasuchus Temporal range: Carnian

Scientific classification
- Kingdom: Animalia
- Phylum: Chordata
- Class: Reptilia
- Clade: Pseudosuchia
- Order: †Aetosauria
- Family: †Stagonolepididae
- Genus: †Rioarribasuchus; Lucas, Hunt & Spielmann, 2006
- Species: †R. chamaensis

Binomial name
- †Rioarribasuchus chamaensis (Zeigler, Heckert & Lucas, 2003)

Synonyms
- Desmatosuchus chamaensis Zeigler, Heckert & Lucas, 2003

Extinct genus of reptiles

Rioarribasuchus is a genus of aetosaur. Fossils have been found from the Chinle Formation in Arizona and New Mexico that date back to the upper Late Carnian stage of the Late Triassic.

== History ==
"Desmatosuchus" chamaensis was named in 2003 and found from the Petrified Forest Member of the Chinle Formation in New Mexico. It was suggested to be more closely related to Paratypothorax, and so Parker gave it the name Heliocanthus. However, this new generic name was first proposed in an unpublished thesis, and thus did not meet ICZN regulations for the naming of a new taxon.

Later published papers reasserted the genetic separation of "D". chamaensis from Desmatosuchus, but the name Heliocanthus remained a nomen nudum until 2007, where it was thoroughly rediscribed in a paper published by the Journal of Systematic Palaeontology.

However, a paper previously published in late 2006 assigned "D". chamaensis to the new genus Rioarribasuchus. As a result, Heliocanthus is a junior objective synonym of Rioarribasuchus because the genus has seniority over Heliocanthus. However, the name Rioarribasuchus has been viewed as a violation of the code of ethics laid out in Appendix A of the International Code of Zoological Nomenclature and the papers that made use of the name have even been described as practicing "intellectual theft". This controversy was connected to a similar allegation of ethical misconduct and editorial mismanagement related to an aetosaur paper published in 2006 by Spielmann and colleagues, who named Redondasuchus rineharti and was accused of plagiarism on Jeffrey Martz's 2002 thesis by Martz and colleagues in 2007.

An article published later in 2007 in the science blog Tetrapod Zoology brought these events to the attention of a wider range of readers, and the controversy was dubbed "Aetogate". This sparked continued debate regarding these issues among vertebrate paleontologists, which eventually led to an investigation by the Society of Vertebrate Paleontology into these issues and a response given in mid 2008 regarding the unethical conduct of the authors who described Redondasuchus rineharti and Rioarribasuchus. While the SVP report was unable to find evidence of explicit plagiarism and theft for both accusations, it did not "absolve either party from responsibility", and also criticized the editorial and regulatory practices of the NMMNH and its staff, the lack of communication or collaboration experienced during the situation, and the difficulty in proving plagiarism or conflicts of interest in paleontological work. A revised code of ethics was published by the SVP alongside the results of their investigation.
