= Redondasuchus =

Redondasuchus Temporal range: Late Triassic, 205 Ma

Scientific classification
- Kingdom: Animalia
- Phylum: Chordata
- Class: Reptilia
- Clade: Pseudosuchia
- Order: †Aetosauria
- Family: †Stagonolepididae
- Subfamily: †Typothoracinae
- Genus: †Redondasuchus; Hunt and Lucas, 1991

Species
- †R. reseri Hunt and Lucas, 1991 (type); †R. rineharti Spielmann et al., 2006

Extinct genus of reptiles

Redondasuchus is an extinct genus of aetosaur. It may be a junior synonym of Typothorax coccinarum, another aetosaur. Redondasuchus is a member of the clade Typothoracisinae within the subfamily Aetosaurinae, and lived during the middle Norian stage of the Late Triassic. Material belonging to the genus has been found from the Redonda Formation in east-central New Mexico. The type species, R. reseri, was named in 1991 after having been referred to as a species of Typothorax since 1985. A second species, R. rineharti, was described in 2006.

== Description and species ==
Redondasuchus was first named with the description of the type species, R. reseri, in 1991. R. reseri was named on the basis of isolated scutes found at Apache Canyon and Shark Tooth Hill in Quay County, New Mexico. R. rineharti was described in 2006 from several scutes and part of a right femur found from Apache Canyon.

While other aetosaurs have scutes covered in pits and grooves that often form radial patterns, the scutes of Redondasuchus are densely covered in pits and lack any patterning. The dorsal paramedian scutes (those that line the back) are unique in that they are angled approximately 45°. In other aetosaurs, the scutes arc smoothly around the back from the midline to the lateral scutes that lie below them and run along the side of the animal.

The dorsal paramedians of R. reseri are smaller than those of R. rineharti. In both species, each paramedian possesses a keel on the underside that extends from the medial edge (the edge near the vertebrae) to the flexed area of the scute.

== Plagiarism allegations ==
=== Background ===
The orientation of the dorsal paramedian osteoderms of Redondasuchus has been disputed. Originally, Hunt & Lucas (1991) argued that the angled part of the osteoderm was two thirds the way down from the medial edge. The holotype osteoderm of R. reseri was identified as a left paramedian based on the position of the anterior bar, an unornamented strip of bone that is known to lie on the front edge of the osteoderm in other aetosaurs. This interpretation was repeated in subsequent papers by Heckert et al. (1996) and Heckert & Lucas (2000).

In 2002, an unpublished Texas Tech University thesis by Jeffrey Martz claimed that the holotype of R. reseri was actually a right paramedian. This was justified by comparison to the structure and ossification pattern of Typothorax coccinarum, a closely related species of aetosaur. Martz also suggested that R. reseri was synonymous with Typothorax coccinarum.

This thesis, though widely disseminated among aetosaur workers, was not published in a peer-reviewed journal. An equivalent reinterpretation of Redondasuchus' osteoderm was first described in a peer-reviewed journal by Spielmann et al. (2006), a review of the taxon published in the New Mexico Museum of Natural History and Science Bulletin. Spielmann, Hunt, and Lucas, who all contributed to the article, were also members of the editorial board for the Bulletin, while Hunt was additionally the museum director at the time. They claimed to provide a novel interpretation of the holotype osteoderm as a right paramedian, noting that the orientation of the osteoderm in the diagrams of previous published papers may have introduced confusion. One diagram, from Heckert et al. (1996), depicted the anterior margin as placed near the bottom of the page with the posterior margin near the top, which may have contributed to its misidentification. Martz's 2002 thesis was widely cited, but only in criticism of his argument that Redondasuchus and Typothorax were synonymous. His arguments on osteoderm orientation were not mentioned.

=== Allegations ===
In 2007, Martz, along with fellow paleontologists Darren Naish, Mike Taylor, and Matt Wedel, publicly accused Spielmann et al. of committing plagiarism. They asserted that the authors of Spielmann et al. (2006) could not have come up with the same interpretation as Martz independently. They pointed to how the authors were in possession of the 2002 thesis for three years, their extensive citation of the thesis, and similarities between certain figures in Spielmann et al. (2006) and the thesis. This controversy was connected to a similar allegation of ethical misconduct and editorial mismanagement related to an aetosaur paper published by NMMNH staff in December 2006. The paper in question provided the genus name Rioarribasuchus for a species of aetosaur which Bill Parker was in the process of publishing under the name Heliocanthus, although Parker's paper was not fully published until January 2007. These coinciding controversies, termed "Aetogate", were publicized both in the scientific community and in local Albuquerque news.

After requests for a New Mexico Department of Cultural Affairs inquiry, allegations by Martz et al., as well as those by Parker, were reviewed and rejected in a 2008 NMMNH meeting which was subsequently reported by Lucas. Lucas's report phrased the omittance of Martz's identification as an "oversight" by Spielmann et al. (2006), and also argued that pre-2002 papers on the topic presented "inconsistencies" rather than a specific argument on orientation. The report's arguments and conclusions were heavily criticized by the accusing parties. A separate independent investigation by the Society of Vertebrate Paleontology did not find evidence for explicit, intentional plagiarism in Spielmann et al. (2006). The SVP report did not "absolve either party from responsibility", and also criticize the editorial and regulatory practices of the NMMNH and its staff, the lack of communication or collaboration experienced during the situation, and the difficulty in proving plagiarism or conflicts of interest in paleontological work. A revised code of ethics was published by the SVP alongside the results of their investigation.

== Phylogeny ==
Heckert et al. (1996) considered Redondasuchus to be part of an advanced grade of aetosaurs that also included Neoaetosauroides, Longosuchus, Desmatosuchus, Paratypothorax, and Typothorax.
