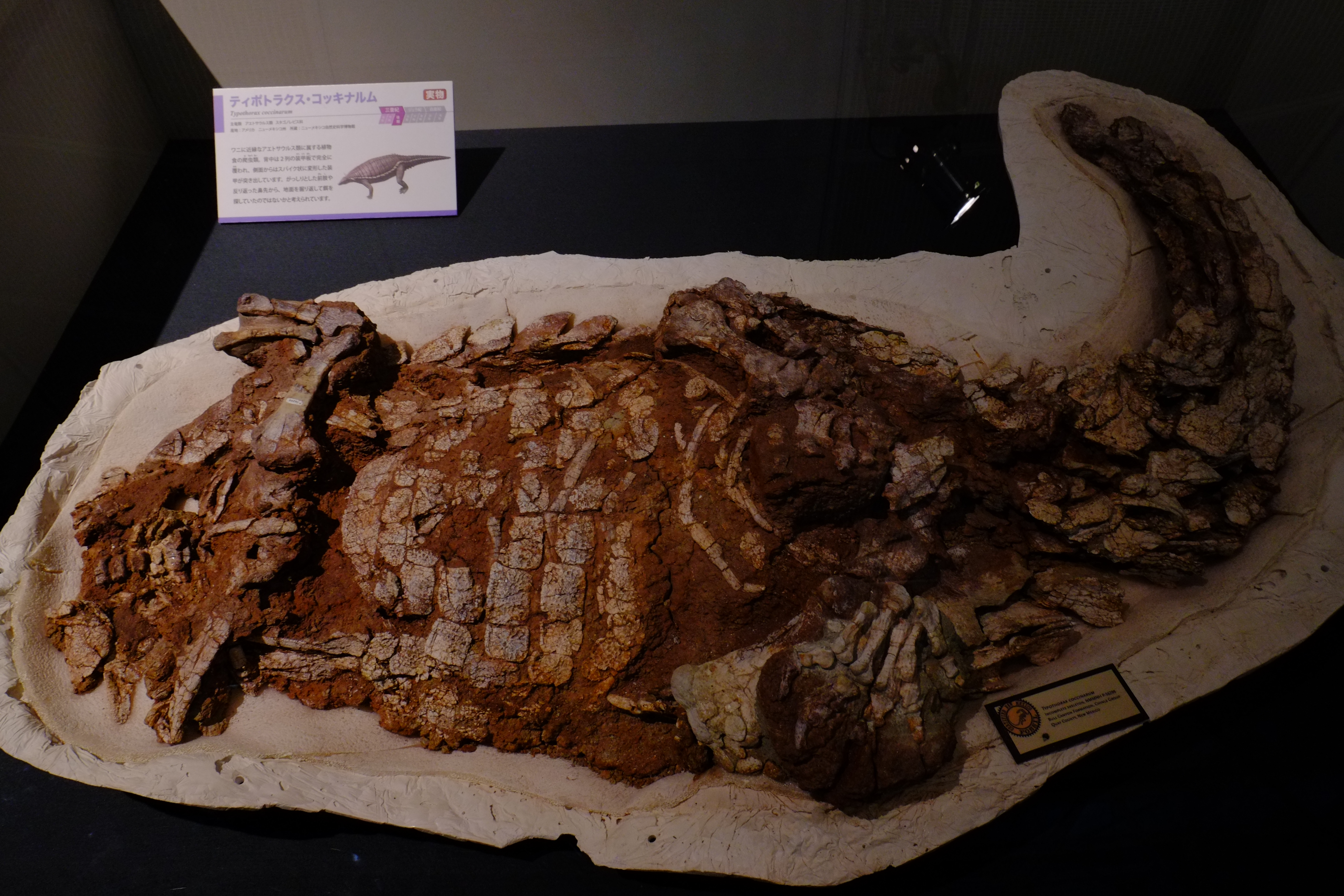
- T. coccinarum skeleton

Scientific classification
- Domain: Eukaryota
- Kingdom: Animalia
- Phylum: Chordata
- Class: Reptilia
- Clade: Archosauria
- Clade: Pseudosuchia
- Order: †Aetosauria
- Family: †Stagonolepididae
- Subfamily: †Typothoracinae
- Genus: †Typothorax; Cope, 1875

Species
- †T. coccinarum Cope, 1875 (type); †T. antiquum Lucas et al., 2002

Synonyms
- Episcoposaurus Cope, 1887; Episcoposaurus horridus Cope, 1887

= Typothorax =

Typothorax Temporal range: Late Triassic, 216–203 Ma

Extinct genus of reptiles

Typothorax is an extinct genus of typothoracine aetosaur that lived in the Late Triassic. Its remains have been found in North America. Two species are known: T. coccinarum, the type species, and T. antiquum.

== Description ==
Size of Typothorax coccinarum relative to a human.

Typothorax was an aetosaur, a pseudosuchian distantly related to modern crocodilians. Unlike modern crocodilians, aetosaurs were herbivorous. Typothorax and other aetosaurs possess small, leaf-shaped teeth that were unsuited for a diet consisting of meat. Unlike some aetosaurs such as Desmatosuchus, Typothorax does not have large shoulder spikes. It does, however, have a pair of enlarged spikes on the neck projecting from the third row of scutes. It has lateral scutes that bear horns that are posteriorly hooked along its back, while its sides and underbelly are covered with ornamented scutes. Although fossils of aetosaurs are not as common as other Triassic archosaurs, with their armor plates being the most common, Typothorax has been represented by fewer skeletal elements than other aetosaurs. The largest known specimen of T. coccinarum, described in 2023, would have been similar in size to Desmatosuchus, measuring over 5 metres (16 ft) long, though it has been identified as a skeletally immature individual (16 to 19 years old) based on the open neurocentral suture and the lines of arrested growth. However, the authors warn that, since smaller individuals have co-ossified neurocentral sutures, they may not be a reliable factor in determining maturity in aetosaurs. So this individual still may be an adult.

The vertebral column of Typothorax is shortened, with individual vertebrae being reduced in length. However, the osteoderms that overly the vertebrae are not shortened. Instead, they are reduced in number so that each dorsal paramedian osteoderm (osteoderm that covers the back) overlies several dorsal vertebrae. In nearly all other crurotarsans, there is one row of osteoderms per vertebra. T. coccinarum has around 20 rows of presacral osteoderms and about 26 presacral vertebrae. If the cervical spikes of Typothorax are homologous to those of Desmatosuchus, it is likely that rows of osteoderms were removed from the front. This is because in Desmatosuchus the spikes are present in the fifth row, while in Typothorax they are present in the third.

In T. coccinarum, there are 10 thoracic columns and four caudal columns of ventral osteoderms on the underside. Unlike all other aetosaurs, Typothorax possesses spiked osteoderms on the underside of the tail, near the cloaca. This region is not covered by osteoderms to the extent that it is in other aetosaurs such as Aetosaurus and Coahomasuchus.

== History ==
Typothorax was one of the earliest vertebrates named from the Triassic of western North America but has been poorly understood since that naming. Paleontologists have found the characteristic armor plates for decades, but only recently has a comprehensive study of Typothorax appeared. It has been found in Arizona, in the Chinle Formation, as well as in New Mexico and Texas in the Bull Canyon Formation of the Dockum Group.

== Paleobiology ==
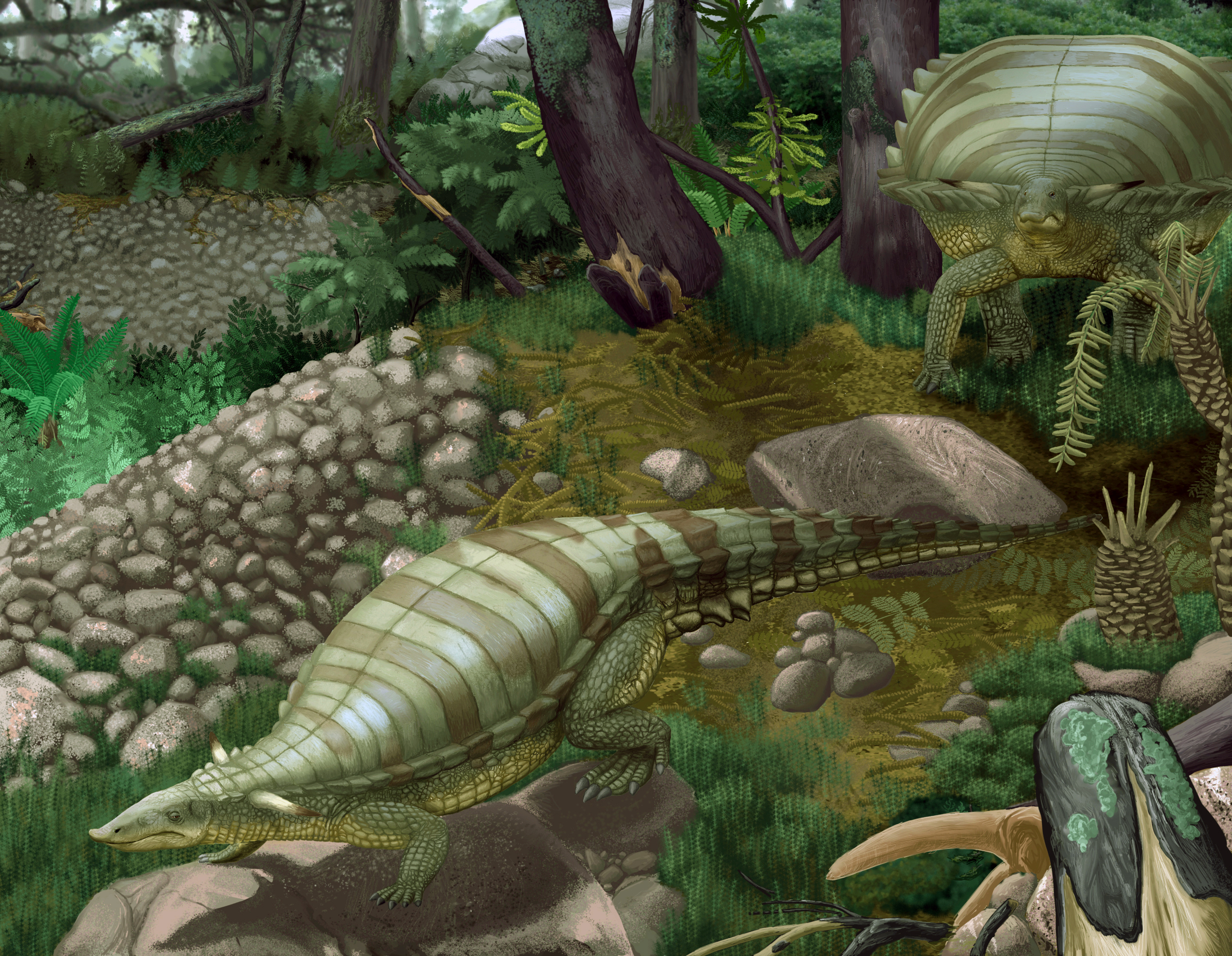
Life restoration of two T. coccinarum

Like all aetosaurs and many other early crurotarsans, Typothorax had erect hindlimbs held beneath the body. This is evident by a straight femur, an anteriorly directed pes (foot), and the projection of the lateral surface of the ilium over the femur. Because the length of the femur is almost equal to that of the tibia and fibula (lower leg) and astragalus and calcaneum (ankle), Typothorax was probably slow-moving. The forelimbs are reduced in size and were directed outward in a sprawling position. This posture is also seen in ankylosaurs, ceratopsians, and the early cynodont Procynosuchus.

Several aspects of the forelimbs have been interpreted as adaptations to digging. Like many digging tetrapods, the radius is significantly shorter than the humerus. Like other aetosaurs, there is a prominent deltopectoral crest on the humerus. The manus is short and wide, a characteristic of digging animals. There is also an entepicondyle on the humerus, which is the origin of forearm pronator and manual flexor muscles. Typothorax also possesses a relatively long olecranon process for the insertion of the M. triceps muscle, but not as long as those of digging animals. Heckert et al. (2010) concluded that Typothorax was not specifically adapted for a fossorial lifestyle but had an ability to dig that other aetosaurs didn't have. The upturned snout of Typothorax and other aetosaurs suggests that they may have searched for food by rooting around in soil.

== Classification ==
Typothorax belongs to a clade of aetosaurs called the Typothoracinae, within the subfamily Aetosaurinae. It is closely related to Redondasuchus. Redondasuchus reseri was first named in 1991, but was later synonymized with T. coccinarum in 1995 on the basis of the similarity between the osteoderms used to describe the species and the anterior osteoderms of T. coccinarum. Martz (2002) suggested that R. reseri belongs to Typothorax, but is still its own species, called T. reseri. More recently, the distinctiveness of Redondasuchus from Typothorax has been supported with the description of a new species, R. rineharti, in 2006. With new skeletal material from T. coccinarum, Heckert et al. (2010) claim that Redondasuchus is distinct from Typothorax because it has strongly flexed paramedian osteoderms, while Typothorax has more gently arching paramedian osteoderms.

Parker (2013) redescribed the holotype of the type species of Typothorax, T. coccinarum. It was found to be too fragmentary to be diagnosable and therefore represents a nomen dubium. Episcoposaurus horridus, the type species of its genus usually considered to be a junior synonym of T. coccinarum, is the next available name for material referred to T. coccinarum. Therefore, other species of Typothorax as well as material referred to T. coccinarum, can be reassigned to Episcoposaurus. Nevertheless, to preserve taxonomic stability Parker (2013) suggested to attempt to petition for a neotype for T. coccinarum from well preserved specimens which have been previously referred to it.
