= Apachesuchus =

Apachesuchus Temporal range: Late Triassic, late Norian

Scientific classification
- Kingdom: Animalia
- Phylum: Chordata
- Class: Reptilia
- Clade: Pseudosuchia
- Order: †Aetosauria
- Family: †Stagonolepididae
- Subfamily: †Typothoracinae
- Genus: †Apachesuchus; Spielmann and Lucas, 2012

Species
- †A. heckerti Spielmann and Lucas, 2012 (type)

Extinct genus of reptiles

Apachesuchus is an extinct genus of aetosaur from the Late Triassic of New Mexico. It is only known from several paramedian osteoderms discovered in Quay County in eastern New Mexico. This area belongs to the late Norian-age Quay Member of the Redonda Formation. Unique among aetosaurs, its osteoderms are nearly completely smooth, without strong pits or grooves. The left dorsal paramedian has a relatively high width-to-length ration (about 3.25), suggesting that Apachesuchus is a wide-bodied aetosaur within the clade Typothoracinae.

The holotype and referred material of Apachesuchus were initially described by Heckert et al. (2001), who assigned them to the South American aetosaur Neoaetosauroides. However, this comparison was based on Neoaetosauroides osteoderms which had been overprepared, removing their surface texture. In their 2012 monograph on vertebrates of the Redonda Formation, Justin Spielmann and Spencer Lucas decided that the material reported by Heckert et al. was sufficiently distinct to be recognized as a new genus and species. They named it Apachesuchus heckerti, in honor of Andrew Heckert.
