= Tecovasuchus =

Tecovasuchus Temporal range: Carnian-Rhaetian, 231.4–205 Ma Late Triassic

Scientific classification
- Domain: Eukaryota
- Kingdom: Animalia
- Phylum: Chordata
- Class: Reptilia
- Clade: Archosauria
- Clade: Pseudosuchia
- Order: †Aetosauria
- Family: †Stagonolepididae
- Genus: †Tecovasuchus; Martz & Small, 2006
- Species: †T. chatterjeei

Binomial name
- †Tecovasuchus chatterjeei Martz & Small, 2006

Extinct genus of reptiles

Tecovasuchus is an extinct genus of aetosaur. It is known primarily from osteoderms found from the Tecovas Formation in Texas, which is Late Triassic in age, dating back to the lower Norian. Material is also known from several other localities of the Chinle Group in New Mexico and Arizona, such as older Carnian outcrops and younger Rhaetian outcrops. Specimens of Tecovasuchus have been collected from the Tecovas Formation, the Bluewater Creek Formation, and the Los Esteros Member of the Santa Rosa Formation.

Tecovasuchus was first recognized as a new taxon in 1995, although it was not named until the description of the type species, T. chatterjeei, in 2006. Before its description, specimens of Tecovasuchus were thought to belong to Paratypothorax or a Paratypothorax-like aetosaur. Several features of the osteoderms distinguish Tecovasuchus from other aetosaur genera, including dorsal paramedian osteoderms with strongly thickened and beveled posterior edges and ornamentation consisting of deep pits and radiating grooves, as well as tongue-shaped dorsal and plate-like ventrolateral flanges.

Tecovasuchus is an index taxon for the St. Johnsian sub-LVF (land vertebrate faunachron) of the Adamanian LVF, and the presence of material belonging to the genus helps correlate different Late Triassic localities throughout the southwestern United States.
