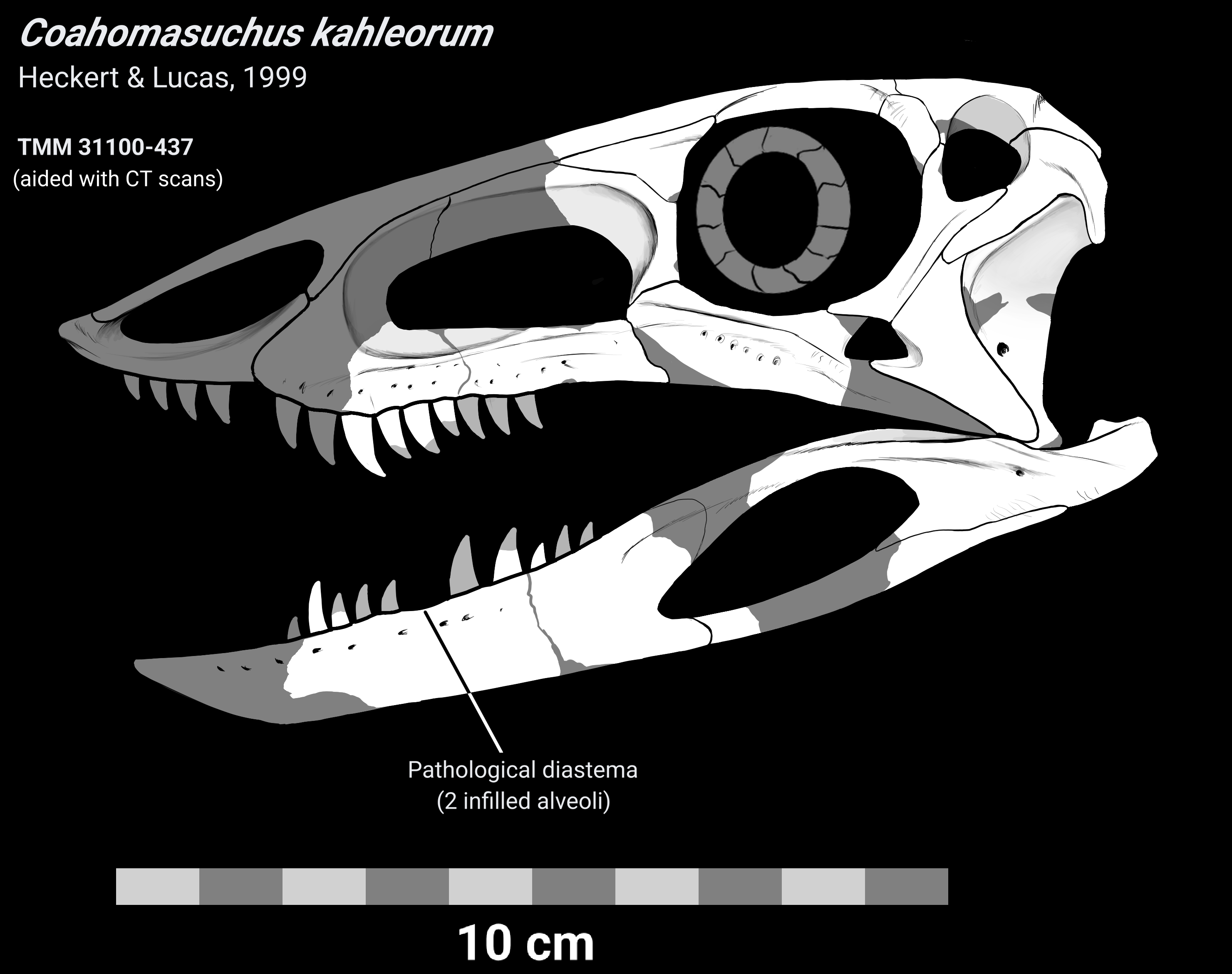
- Skull diagram

Scientific classification
- Kingdom: Animalia
- Phylum: Chordata
- Class: Reptilia
- Clade: Pseudosuchia
- Order: †Aetosauria
- Family: †Stagonolepididae
- Subfamily: †Aetosaurinae
- Genus: †Coahomasuchus; Heckert & Lucas, 1999

Species
- †C. kahleorum Heckert & Lucas, 1999 (type); †C. chathamensis Heckert et al., 2017

= Coahomasuchus =

Coahomasuchus Temporal range: Carnian

Extinct genus of reptiles

Coahomasuchus is an extinct genus of aetosaurine aetosaur. Remains of the genus have been found from deposits in Texas and North Carolina that date to the Otischalkian faunachron (lower late Carnian) of the Late Triassic. It was small for an aetosaur, being less than 1.5 metres (4 ft 11 in) long. The dorsal plates are distinctively flat and unflexed, and have a faint sub-parallel to radial ornamentation. The genus lacked spines or keels on these plates, features seen in many other aetosaurs. Coahomasuchus was very similar in appearance to the closely related Aetosaurus.

Two species of Coahomasuchus are known. C. kahleorum, the type species, was named by Heckert and Lucas in 1999; it is known from the Colorado City Formation of the Dockum Group. C. chathamensis, a second species named by Heckert et al. in 2017, is from the Pekin Formation of the Newark Supergroup. The holotype of the latter species contains parts of the skull, which is rare among aetosaurs. The teeth were sharp and recurved, indicating a carnivorous diet, a detail only shared with Aetosauroides within aetosauria. C. chathamensis differs from C. kahleorum by wider osteoderms on the back and the underside of the neck, as well as the relative lengths of the processes of the surangular.
