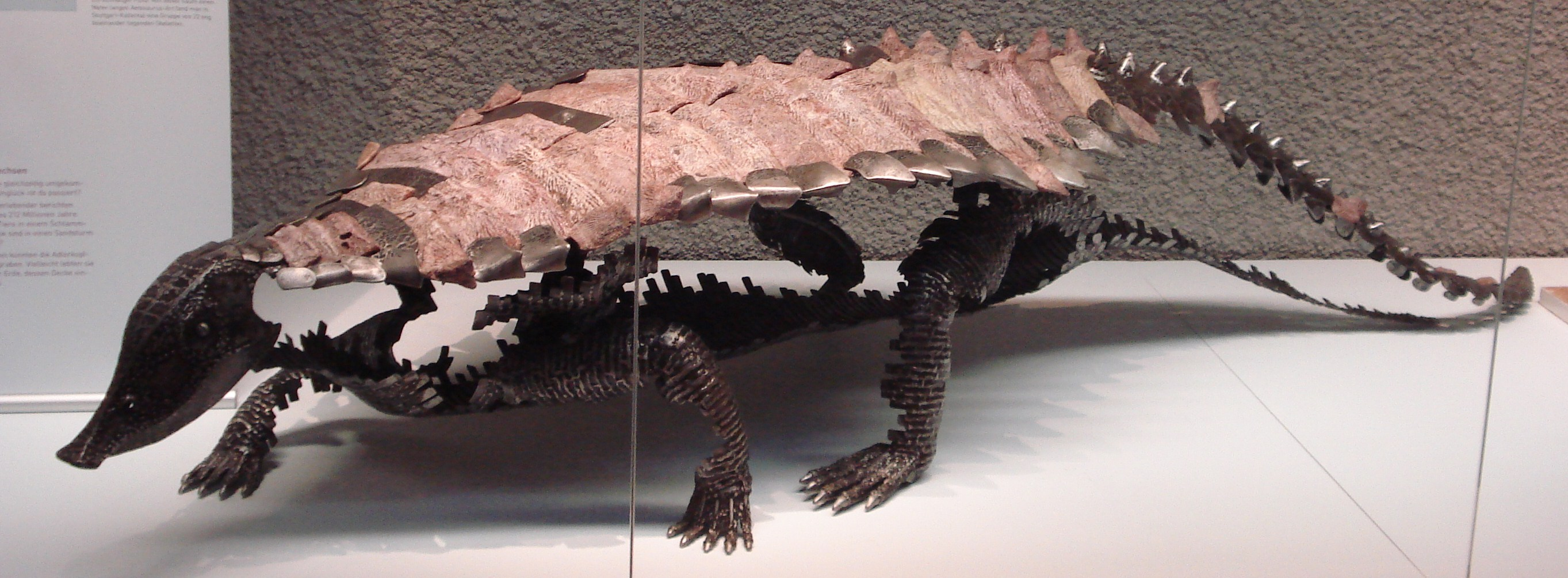
- Type specimen SMNS 5721 on display

Scientific classification
- Kingdom: Animalia
- Phylum: Chordata
- Class: Reptilia
- Clade: Archosauria
- Clade: Pseudosuchia
- Order: †Aetosauria
- Family: †Stagonolepididae
- Tribe: †Paratypothoracini
- Genus: †Paratypothorax; Long and Ballew, 1985

Type species
- †Paratypothorax andressi Long and Ballew, 1985

Species
- †P. andressorum Long and Ballew, 1985 emend. Heckert and Lucas, 2000 (type)

= Paratypothorax =

Paratypothorax Temporal range: Late Carnian? - Rhaetian, 216–201.6 Ma

Genus of reptiles

Paratypothorax is an extinct genus of aetosaur, known from a single species, Paratypothorax andressorum. It was a broadly distributed member of the group found in Germany, North America, and possibly parts of Gondwana. The best specimens come from Germany, though for more than a century they were mistakenly considered phytosaur armor. Paratypothorax was a large and wide-bodied typothoracine aetosaur, as well as the namesake of the tribe Paratypothoracisini.

== Discovery and distribution ==
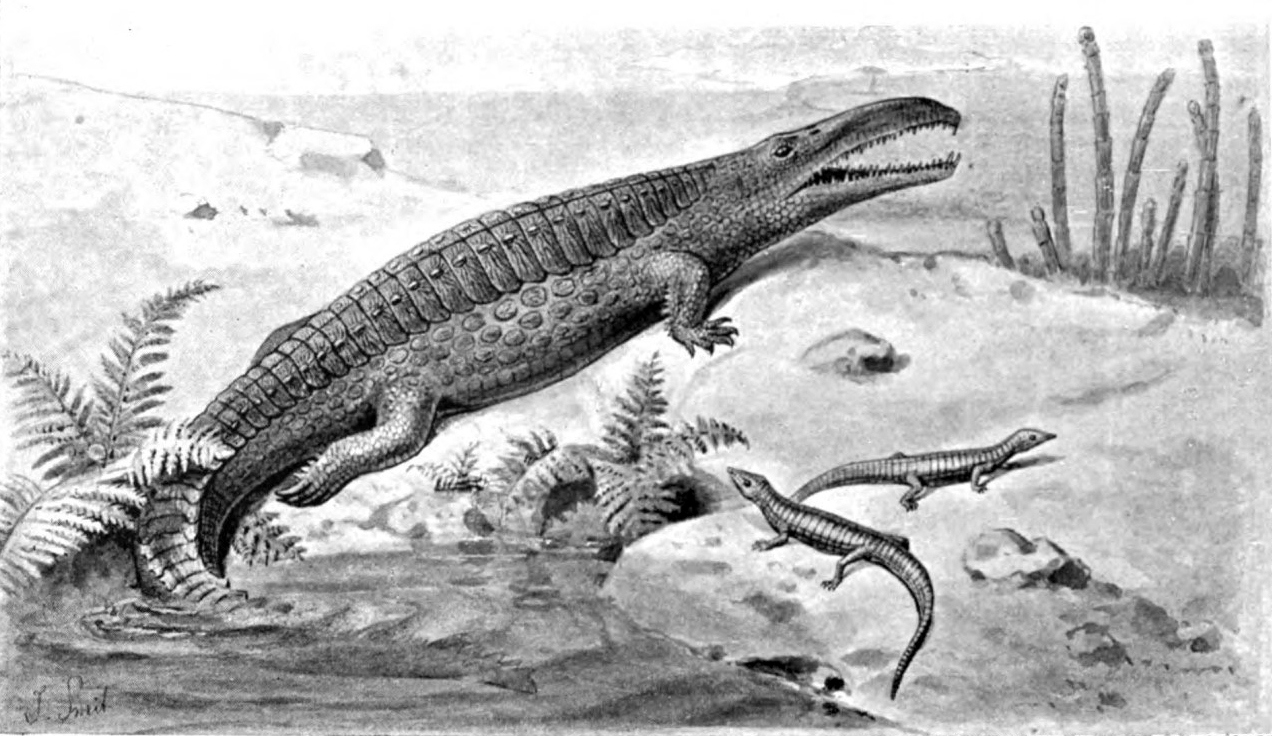
1894 restoration of "Belodon", based on the skull of Nicrosaurus and the carapace of the aetosaur now known as Paratypothorax

Paratypothorax was first known from specimens collected from the Heslach area near Stuttgart in Germany. These hail from the Stubensandstein (also known as the Löwenstein Formation), a mid-Norian age geological unit. Heslach has also produced many fossils of a smaller aetosaur, Aetosaurus. The holotype specimen of Paratypothorax, SMNS 5721, consists of a series of articulated osteoderms alongside a few hip and leg bones. Large osteoderms of Paratypothorax were long misidentified as phytosaur armor, and referred to Belodon. Among this formerly misidentified material is SMNS 19003, a fossil unearthed in 1945 from the Schlipf Quarry near Murrhardt. Further preparation revealed that SMNS 19003 was a complete skeleton with a well-preserved skull and fully articulated carapace. Paratypothorax was first recognized as an aetosaur in 1953, and was named as a new genus in 1985.

In 1992, Paratypothorax fossils were first identified in the Chinle Group of the southwestern United States. It has been found in the Sonsela Member of Petrified Forest National Park in Arizona, as well as the Bluewater Creek Formation of western New Mexico. It is also common in strata of the Dockum Group further in eastern New Mexico and Texas. Osteoderms of Paratypothorax have also been reported from the Norian-age Fleming Fjord Formation in Greenland, the Zarzaitine Series of Algeria, and an unverified occurrence in India.

== Description ==
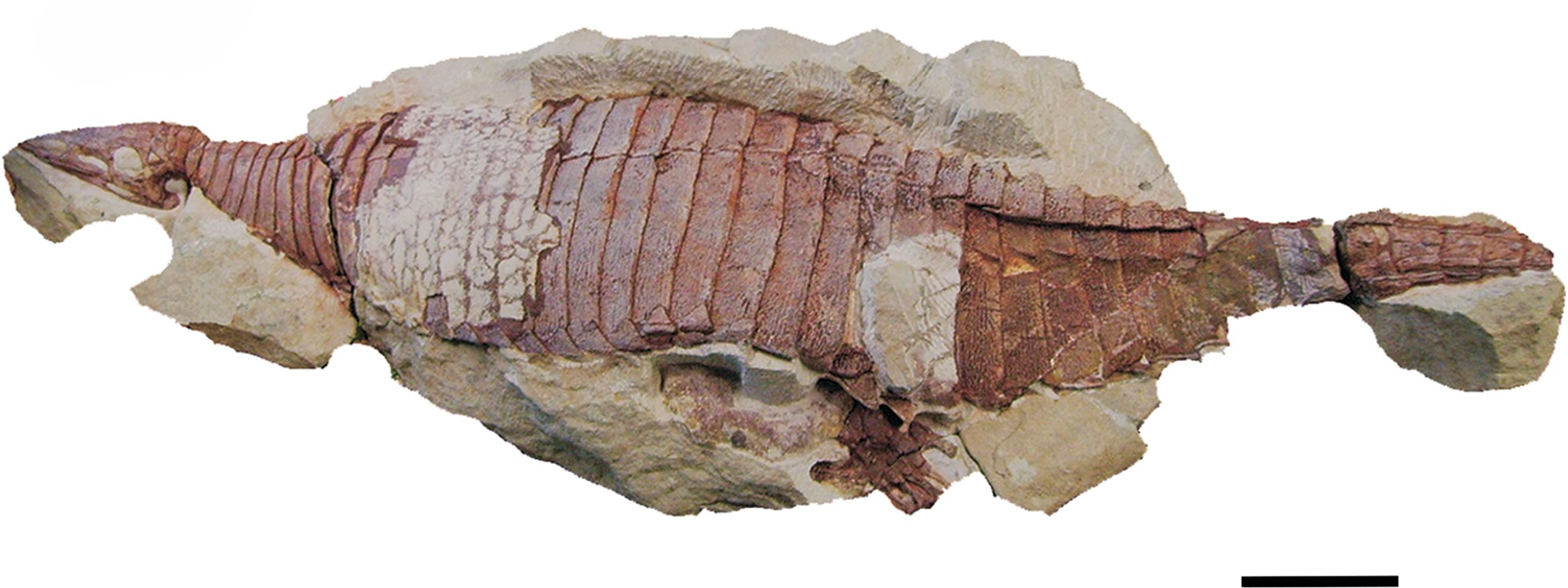
Paratypothorax specimen SMNS 19003, an articulated skull with dorsal armor

Paratypothorax possesses paramedian scutes that are wide, strap-like, and have grooves and pits on them forming radial patterns. Like other typothoracisines such as Typothorax, the lateral scutes bear large horns that are posteriorly hooked. The rear of each scute is overlapped by a prominent knob.
