= List of crurotarsan genera =

This list of crurotarsans is a comprehensive listing of all genera that have ever been included in the clade Crurotarsi, excluding purely vernacular terms. Under some definitions Crurotarsi includes all archosaurs, but this list excludes archosaur genera that are included in Avemetatarsalia (pterosaurs, nonavian dinosaurs, and birds). The list includes all commonly accepted genera, but also genera that are now considered invalid, doubtful (nomen dubium), or were not formally published (nomen nudum), as well as junior synonyms of more established names, and genera that are no longer considered crurotarsan. Extinct taxa are denoted with a dagger (†). The list contains 662 names, of which approximately 573 are considered either valid crurotarsan genera or nomina dubia.

== Scope and terminology ==
There is no official, canonical list of crurotarsan genera, but one of the most thorough attempts can be found on the Crurotarsi section of Mikko Haaramo's Phylogeny Archive. That list has been supplemented with the Paleofile listing for Crocodylomorpha.

Naming conventions and terminology follow the International Code of Zoological Nomenclature. Technical terms used include:

- Junior synonym: A name which describes the same taxon as a previously published name. If two or more genera are formally designated and the type specimens are later assigned to the same genus, the first to be published (in chronological order) is the senior synonym, and all other instances are junior synonyms. Senior synonyms are generally used, except by special decision of the ICZN, but junior synonyms cannot be used again, even if deprecated. Junior synonymy is often subjective, unless the genera described were both based on the same type specimen.
- Nomen nudum (Latin for "naked name"): A name that has appeared in print but has not yet been formally published by the standards of the ICZN. Nomina nuda (the plural form) are invalid, and are therefore not italicized as a proper generic name would be. If the name is later formally published, that name is no longer a nomen nudum and will be italicized on this list. Often, the formally published name will differ from any nomina nuda that describe the same specimen. In this case, these nomina nuda will be deleted from this list in favor of the published name.
- Preoccupied name: A name that is formally published, but which has already been used for another taxon. This second use is invalid (as are all subsequent uses) and the name must be replaced. As preoccupied names are not valid generic names, they will also go unitalicized on this list.
- Nomen dubium (Latin for "dubious name"): A name describing a fossil with no unique diagnostic features. This can be an extremely subjective and controversial designation and is to be used cautiously.

== A ==
Contents:	A B C D E F G H I J K L M N O P Q R S T U V W X Y Z — See also

- †Acaenasuchus
- †Acherontisuchus
- †Acompsosaurus
- †Acresuchus
- †Acynodon
- †Adamanasuchus
- †Adamantinasuchus
- †Adzhosuchus
- †Aegisuchus
- †Aegyptosuchus
- †Aeolodon — junior synonym of Steneosaurus
- †Aetobarbakinoides
- †Aetosauroides
- †Aetosaurus
- †Ahdeskatanka
- †Agaresuchus
- †Aggiosaurus
- †Aigialosuchus
- †Akanthosuchus
- †Aktiogavialis
- †Albertochampsa
- †Albertosuchus
- †Aldabrachampsus

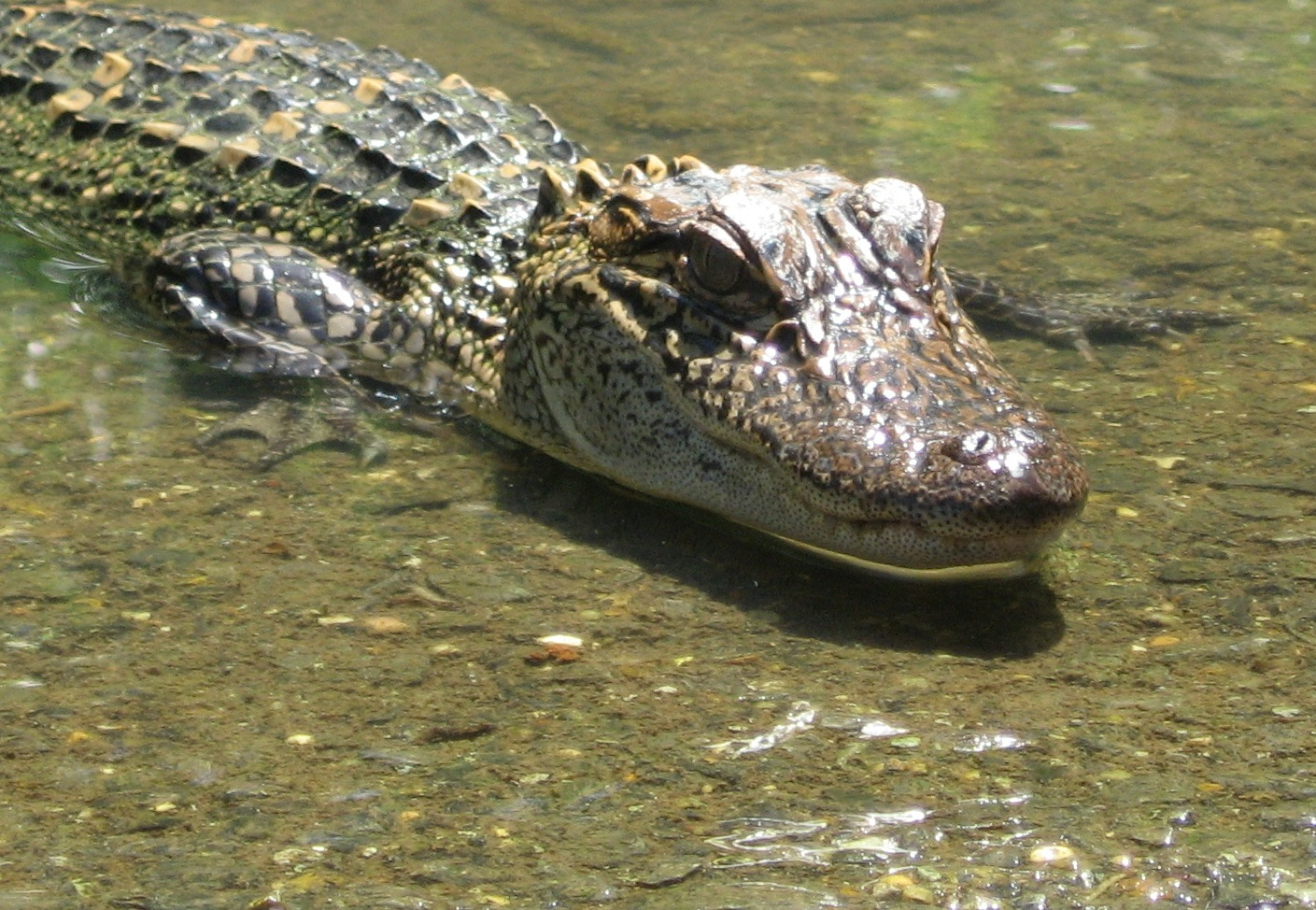
An American alligator.

- Alligator
- †Alligatorellus
- †Alligatorium
- †Allodaposuchus
- †Allognathosuchus
- †Almadasuchus
- †Amargasuchus
- †Amphicotylus
- †Anatosuchus
- †Andrianavoay
- †Angistorhinopsis
- †Angistorhinus
- †Anglosuchus
- †Antaeusuchus
- †Antecrocodylus
- †Anteophthalmosuchus
- †Anthracosuchus
- †Apachesuchus
- †Apatosuchus
- †Aphaurosuchus
- †Aplestosuchus
- †Aprosuchus
- †Arambourgia
- †Arambourgisuchus
- †Araripesuchus
- †Archaeosuchus — preoccupied by a synapsid, renamed Protosuchus
- †Arenysuchus
- †Arganarhinus
- †Arganasuchus
- †Argentinosuchus — junior synonym of Stagonolepis
- †Argochampsa
- †Arizonasaurus
- †Armadillosuchus
- Aromosuchus — junior synonym of Paleosuchus
- †Arribasuchus — junior synonym of Machaeroprosopus
- †Artzosuchus
- †Asiatosuchus
- †Astorgosuchus
- †Atacisaurus — junior synonym of Tomistoma
- †Atlantosuchus
- †Atoposaurus
- †Australosuchus
- †Ayllusuchus

== B ==
Contents:	A B C D E F G H I J K L M N O P Q R S T U V W X Y Z — See also

- †Baharijodon
- †Balanerodus
- †Barberenasuchus
- †Barcinosuchus
- †Barinasuchus
- †Baroqueosuchus — junior synonym of Protosuchus
- †Barreirosuchus
- †Barrosasuchus
- †Baru
- †Baryphracta

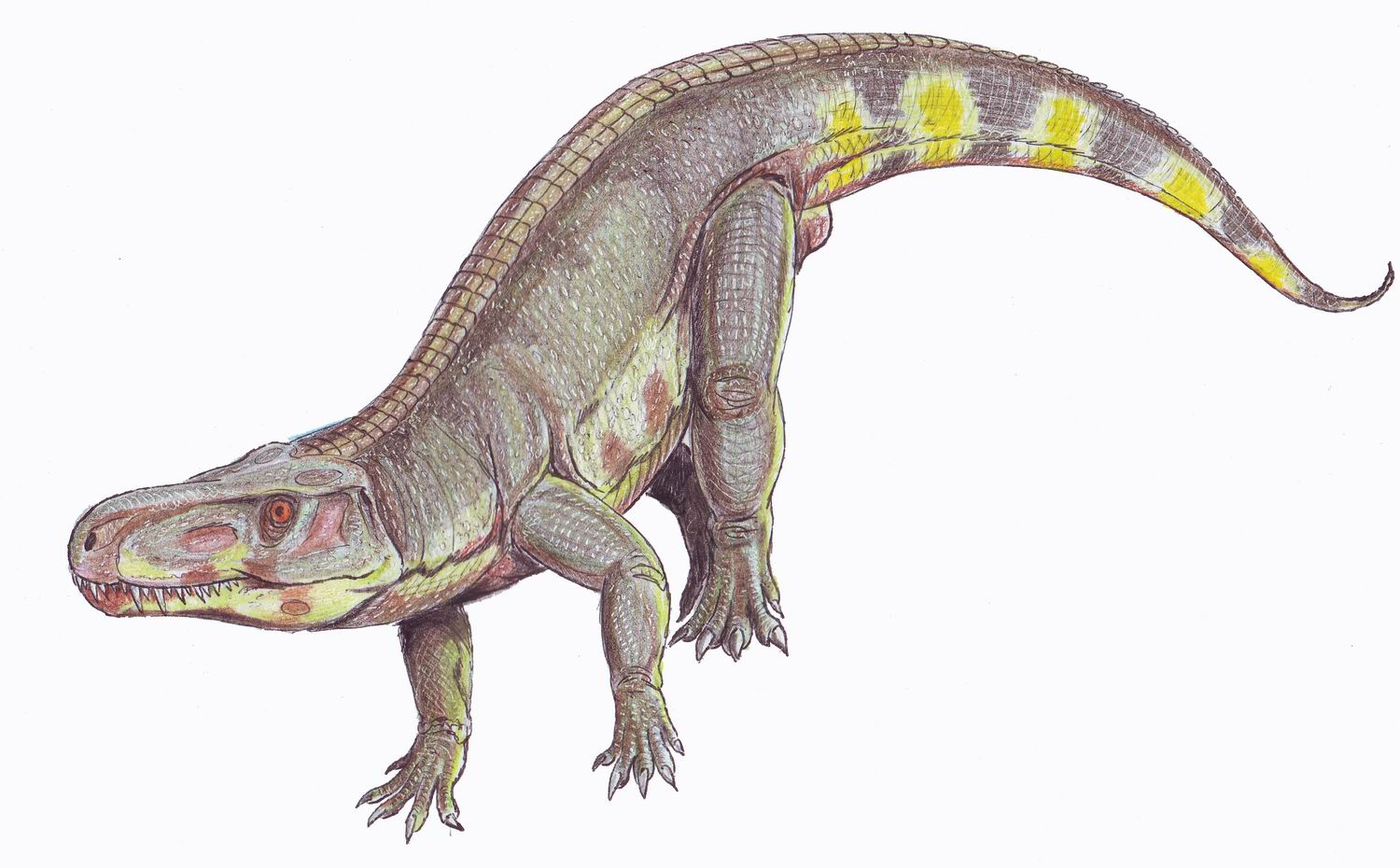
An artist's re-creation of an Batrachotomus kupferzellensis

- †Basutodon
- †Bathysuchus
- †Batrachomimus
- †Batrachotomus
- †Bayomesasuchus
- †Baurusuchus
- †Belodon
- †Benggwigwishingasuchus
- †Bergisuchus
- †Bernissartia
- †Bombifrons — junior synonym of Crocodylus
- †Borealosuchus
- †Bottosaurus
- †Boverisuchus
- †Brachiosuchus
- †Brachychampsa
- †Brachygnathosuchus
- †Brachysuchus
- †Brachytaenius — junior synonym of Geosaurus
- †Brachyuranochampsa
- †Brasileosaurus
- †Brasilosuchus
- †Bretesuchus
- †Brillanceausuchus
- †Brochuchus
- †Bromsgroveia
- †Burkesuchus
- †Bystrowisuchus

== C ==
Contents:	A B C D E F G H I J K L M N O P Q R S T U V W X Y Z — See also

- Caiman

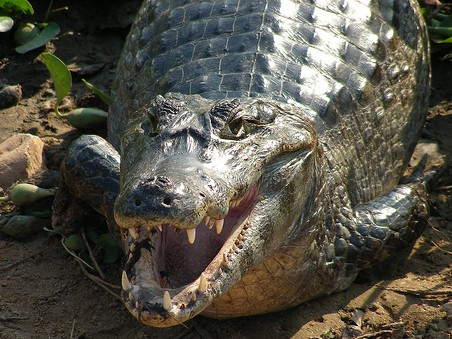
A yacare caiman (jacaré) from Brazil.

- †Caimanoidea — junior synonym of Alligator
- †Caimanosuchus — junior synonym of Diplocynodon
- Caigator — junior synonym of Alligator
- †Caipirasuchus
- †Calsoyasuchus
- †Calyptosuchus
- †Campinasuchus
- †Candidodon
- †Capelliniosuchus — once thought to be a metriorhynchid, now known to be a mosasaur
- †Carandaisuchus
- †Caririsuchus
- †Carnufex
- †Caryonosuchus
- †Cassissuchus
- †Centemodon
- †Centenariosuchus
- †Ceratosuchus
- †Cerrejonisuchus
- †Chalawan
- Champsa — referred to both Alligator and Caiman
- †Champse — junior synonym of Crocodylus
- †Charactosuchus
- †Charitomenosuchus
- †Chatterjeea — junior synonym of Shuvosaurus
- †Chenanisuchus
- †Chiayusuchus
- †Chilenosuchus
- †Chimaerasuchus
- †Chinatichampsus
- †Chrysochampsa
- †Cladeiodon — possible senior synonym of Teratosaurus
- †Clarencea
- †Clovesuurdameredeor
- †Coahomasuchus
- †Coburgosuchus
- †Coelosuchus
- †Colhuehuapisuchus
- †Collilongus
- †Coloradisuchus
- †Colossoemys
- †Colossosuchus
- †Comahuesuchus
- †Confractosuchus
- †Congosaurus
- †Coringasuchus
- †Coronelsuchus
- †Cricosaurus
- †Crocodilaemus
- Crocodylus
- †Ctenosauriscus
- Ctenosaurus — preoccupied by extant iguanid, referred to Ctenosauriscus
- †Culebrasuchus
- †"Cunampaia" — a nomen dubium; originally considered a phorusrhacid bird, probably a mesoeucrocodylian
- †Cynodontosuchus
- Cynosuchus — junior synonym of Caiman
- †Cystosaurus

== D ==
Contents:	A B C D E F G H I J K L M N O P Q R S T U V W X Y Z — See also

- †Dadagavialis
- †Dagasuchus
- †Dakosaurus

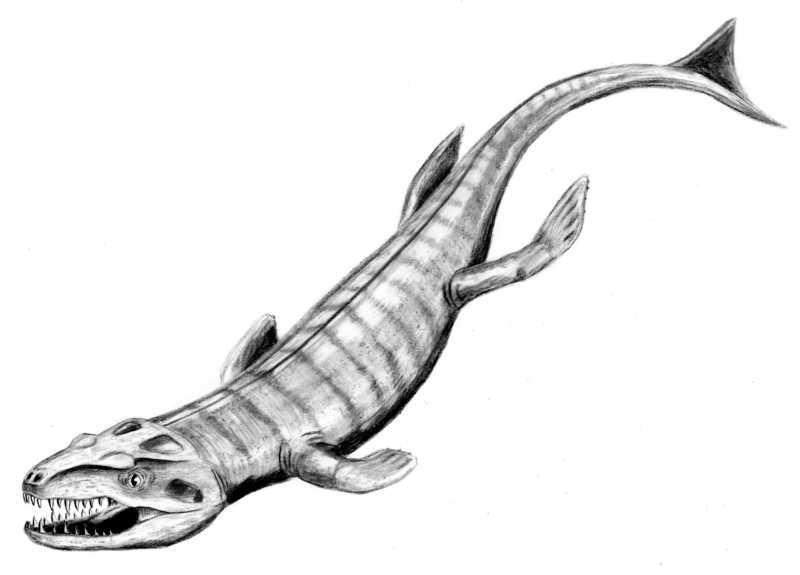
An artist's reconstruction of Dakosaurus andiniensis.

- †Dakotasuchus
- †Dasygnathoides
- †"Dasygnathus" — preoccupied, renamed Dasygnathoides
- †Decuriasuchus
- †Deinosuchus
- †Deltasuchus
- †Denazinosuchus
- †Dentaneosuchus
- †Deslongchampsina
- †Desmatosuchus
- †Dianchungosaurus
- †Diandongosuchus
- †Dianosuchus
- †Dibothrosuchus
- †Dinosuchus
- †Diplocynodon
- †Diplocynodus — junior synonym of Diplocynodon
- †Diplosaurus
- †Dolichobrachium
- †Dolichochampsa
- †Dollosuchoides
- †Dollosuchus
- †Dongnanosuchus
- †Dongusia
- †Doratodon
- †Dorbignysuchus
- †Doswellia
- †Dromicosuchus
- †Duerosuchus
- †Dynamosuchus
- †Dyoplax
- †Dyrosaurus
- †Dzungarisuchus

== E ==
Contents:	A B C D E F G H I J K L M N O P Q R S T U V W X Y Z — See also

- †Ebrachosaurus
- †Ebrachosuchus
- †Edentosuchus
- †Effigia

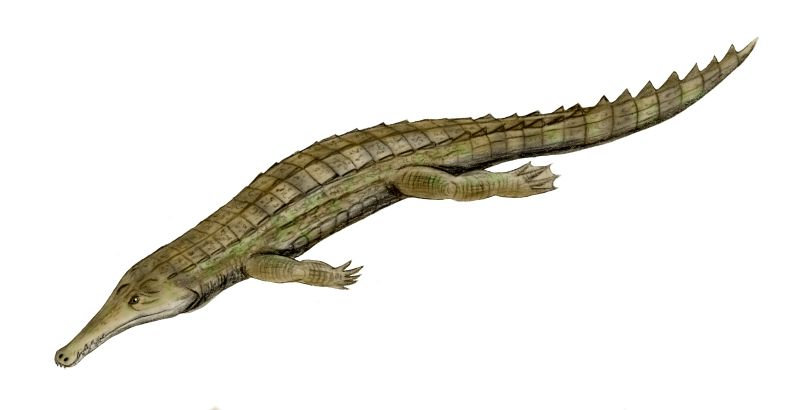
An artist's reconstruction of Elosuchus.

- †"Eleiosuchus" — nomen nudum, referred to Elosuchus
- †Elosuchus
- †Enalioetes
- †Enaliosuchus — junior synonym of Cricosaurus
- †Energosuchus
- †Engyomasaurus — junior synonym of Steneosaurus
- †Entradasuchus
- †Eoalligator
- †Eocaiman
- †Eocenosuchus — junior synonym of Diplocynodon
- †Eogavialis
- †Eoneustes
- †Eopneumatosuchus
- †Eosuchus
- †Eothoracosaurus
- †Eotomistoma
- †Episcoposaurus — junior synonym of Typothorax
- †Epoidesuchus
- †Eptalofosuchus
- †Eremosuchus
- †Eridanosaurus — originally described as a crocodilian, but actually a rhinocerotid
- †Erpetosuchus
- †Erythrochampsa
- †Etjosuchus
- †Eurycephalosuchus
- †Euscolosuchus
- †Euthecodon
- †Eutretauranosuchus

== F ==
Contents:	A B C D E F G H I J K L M N O P Q R S T U V W X Y Z — See also

- †Fasolasuchus
- †Fenhosuchus
- †Ferganosuchus
- †Fortignathus
- †Francosuchus
- †Fruitachampsa

== G ==
Contents:	A B C D E F G H I J K L M N O P Q R S T U V W X Y Z — See also

- †Galtonia — probable junior synonym of Revueltosaurus
- †Garzapelta
- †Gasparinisuchus
- †Gavialinum

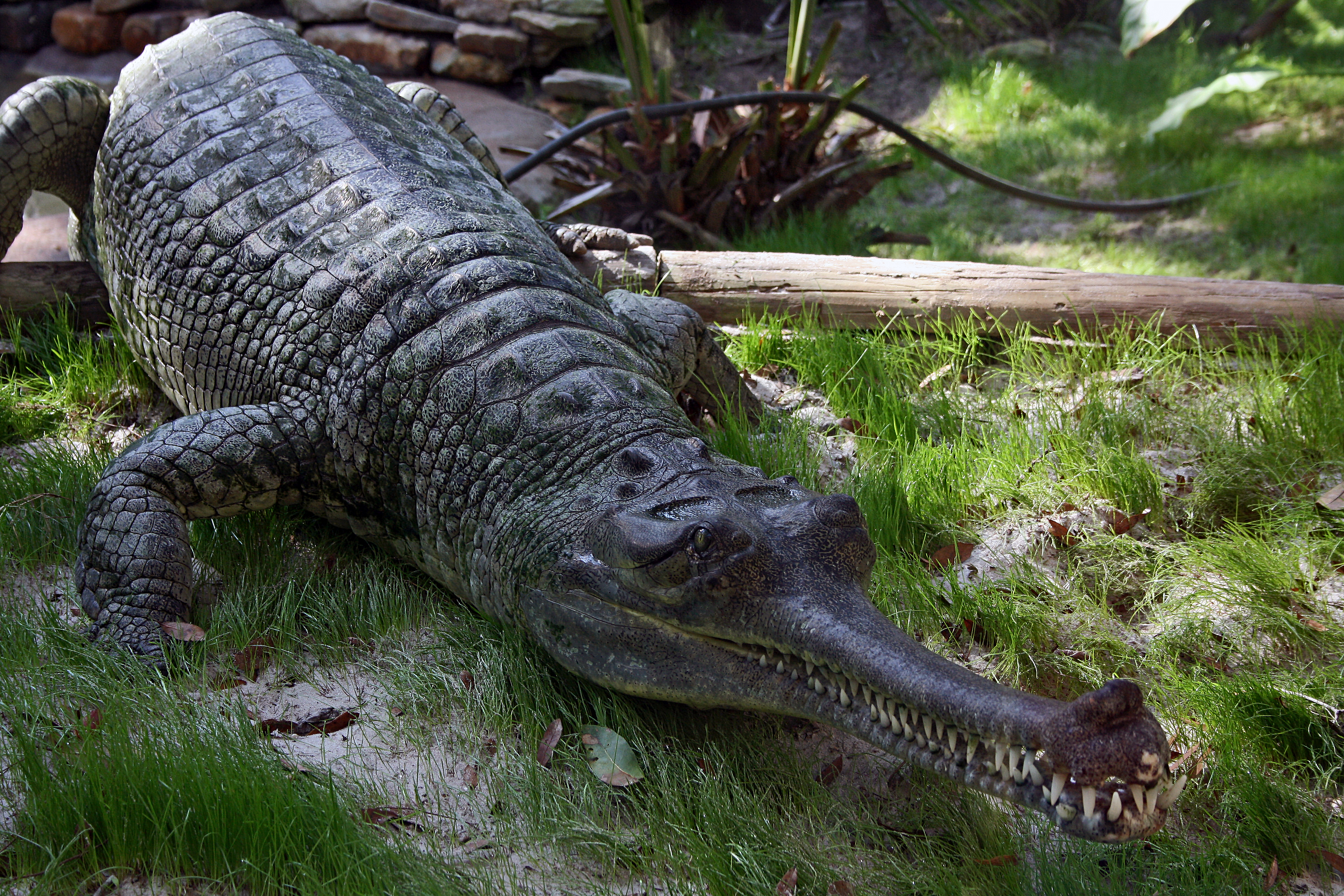
A Gavial from India.

- Gavialis
- †Gavialosuchus
- †Geosaurus
- †Gilchristosuchus
- †Glaphyrorhynchus — junior synonym of Steneosaurus
- †Globidentosuchus
- †Gnatusuchus
- †Gobiosuchus
- †Gondwanasuchus
- †Goniopholis
- †Gorgetosuchus
- †Gracilineustes
- †Gracilisuchus
- †Gryposuchus
- †Guarinisuchus
- †Gunggamarandu

== H ==
Contents:	A B C D E F G H I J K L M N O P Q R S T U V W X Y Z — See also

- †Hadongsuchus — nomen nudum
- †Haematosaurus
- Halcrosia — junior synonym of Osteolaemus
- †Halilimnosaurus — junior synonym of Geosaurus
- †Hallopus
- †Hamadasuchus
- †Harpacochampsa
- †Hassiacosuchus
- †Hanyusuchus
- †Heliocanthus — possible junior synonym of Rioarribasuchus
- †Helmstedtisuchus — actually a teleost fish
- †Hemiprotosuchus
- †Heptasuchus
- †Hesperogavialis

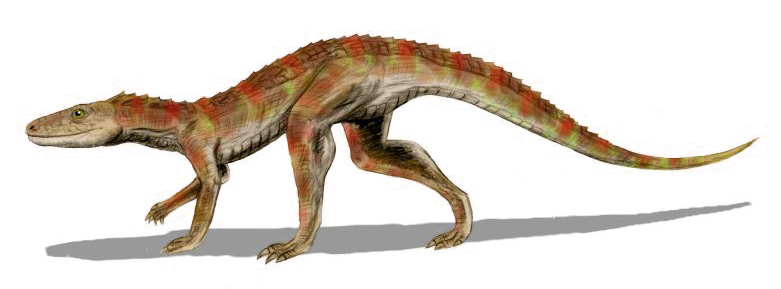
An artist's reconstruction of Hesperosuchus .

- †Hesperosuchus
- †Heterodontosuchus
- †Heterosuchus
- †Hispanochampsa
- †Holops — preoccupied by a brachyceran fly, renamed Holopsisuchus
- †Holopsisuchus — junior synonym of Thoracosaurus
- †"Hoplitosaurus" — preoccupied by the ankylosaurian dinosaur Hoplitosaurus; now known as Hoplitosuchus
- †Hoplitosuchus
- †Hoplosuchus
- †Hsisosuchus
- †Huenesuchus — junior synonym of Prestosuchus
- †Hulkepholis
- †Hylaeochampsa
- †Hyposaurus
- †Hypselorhachis

== I ==
Contents:	A B C D E F G H I J K L M N O P Q R S T U V W X Y Z — See also

- †Iberosuchus
- †Ibirasuchus
- †Ichthyosuchus — junior synonym of Crocodylus
- †Ieldraan
- †Iharkutosuchus
- †Ikanogavialis
- †Ilchunaia
- †Indosinosuchus
- †Ischyrochampsa
- †Isisfordia
- †Isselosaurus — referred to both Iberosuchus and Tomistoma
- †Itasuchus

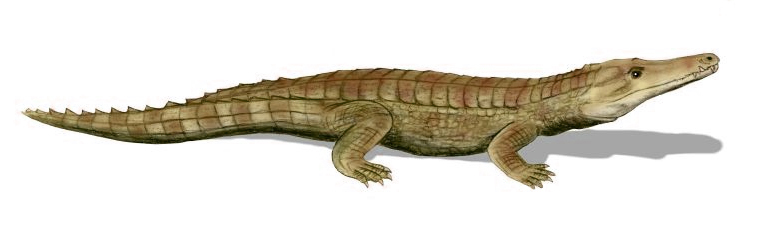
An artist's reconstruction of Itasuchus.

== J ==
Contents:	A B C D E F G H I J K L M N O P Q R S T U V W X Y Z — See also

- Jacare — junior synonym of Caiman
- Jacaretinga — referred to both Caiman and Paleosuchus
- †Jaikosuchus
- †Jiangxisuchus
- †Junggarsuchus
- †Jupijkam
- †Jushatyria

== K ==
Contents:	A B C D E F G H I J K L M N O P Q R S T U V W X Y Z — See also

- †Kambara
- †Kansajsuchus
- †Kaprosuchus
- †Karamuru
- †Karatausuchus
- †Kalthifrons
- †Kayentasuchus
- †Kemkemia
- †Kentisuchus
- †Khoratosuchus
- †Kinesuchus
- †Kinyang
- †Kladeisteriondon — junior synonym of Teratosaurus
- †Knoetschkesuchus
- †Kocurypelta
- †Kostensuchus
- †Krabisuchus
- †Kryphioparma
- †Krzyzanowskisaurus
- †Koumpiodontosuchus
- †Kuttanacaiman
- †Kuttysuchus
- †Kyasuchus

== L ==
Contents:	A B C D E F G H I J K L M N O P Q R S T U V W X Y Z — See also

- †Labidiosuchus
- †Laganosuchus
- †Langstonia
- †Lavocatchampsa
- †Leidyosuchus
- †Leiokarinosuchus
- †Lemmysuchus
- †Leptocranius — junior synonym of Steneosaurus
- †Leptorrhamphus
- †Leptosuchus
- †Lesothosuchus — junior synonym of Protosuchus
- †Lianghusuchus
- †Libycosuchus
- †Limnosaurus
- †Lisboasaurus
- †Listrognathosuchus
- †Litargosuchus
- †Llanosuchus
- †Lohuecosuchus
- †Lomasuchus
- †Longosuchus
- †Lorosuchus
- †Lotosaurus

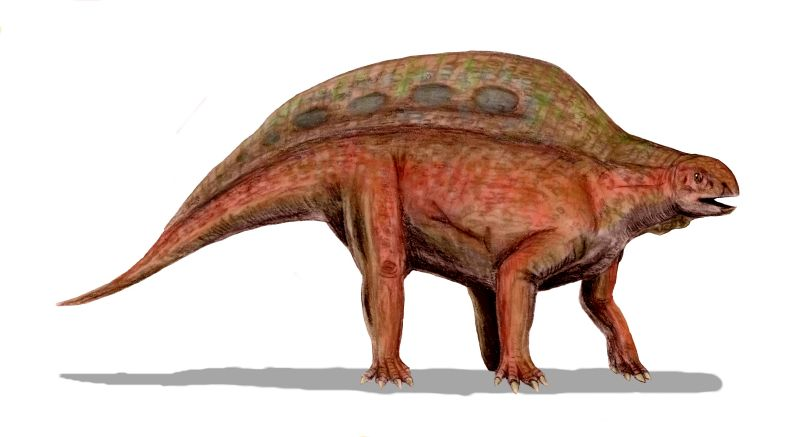
An artist's reconstruction of Lotosaurus.

- †Lucasuchus
- †Luciasuchus
- †Luperosuchus
- †Lusitanisuchus
- †Lythrosuchus — junior synonym of Poposaurus

== M ==
Contents:	A B C D E F G H I J K L M N O P Q R S T U V W X Y Z — See also

- †Macelognathus
- †Machaeroprosopus
- †Machimosaurus
- †Macrospondylus — junior synonym of Steneosaurus
- †Macrorhynchus — junior synonym of Pholidosaurus
- †Magyarosuchus
- †Mahajangasuchus
- †Malawisuchus
- †Maledictosuchus
- †Mandasuchus
- †Manracosuchus — probable junior synonym of Allognathosuchus
- †Maomingosuchus
- †Mariliasuchus
- †Marmarosaurus
- †Maroccosuchus
- †Massaliasuchus
- †Mambawakale
- Mecistops
- †Megadontosuchus
- †"Megalosaurus"
- †Mekosuchus
- Melanosuchus

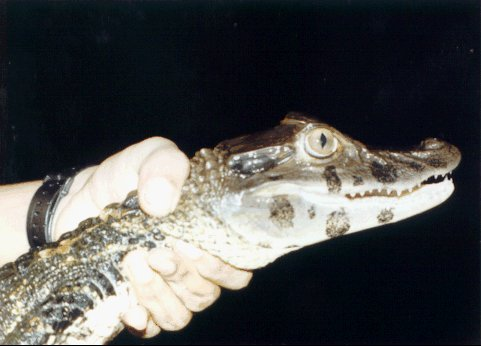
A black caiman (Melanosuchus).

- †Melitosaurus
- †Menatalligator
- †Meridiosaurus
- †Mesorhinosuchus
- †"Mesorhinus" — preoccupied by the macraucheniid mammal Mesorhinus, which is now considered a junior synonym of Oxyodontherium; now known as Mesorhinosuchus
- †Metiorychus — lapsus calami of Metriorhynchus
- †Metriorhynchus
- †Miadanasuchus
- †Microchampsa
- †Microsuchus
- Molinia — junior synonym of Crocodylus
- †Montealtosuchus
- †Montsecosuchus
- †Morrinhosuchus
- †Mosellaesaurus — junior synonym of Pelagosaurus
- †Motinia — junior synonym of Crocodylus
- †Mourasuchus
- †Musturzabalsuchus
- †Mycterosuchus — junior synonym of Steneosaurus
- †Mystriosaurus — junior synonym of Steneosaurus
- †Mystriosuchus

== N ==
Contents:	A B C D E F G H I J K L M N O P Q R S T U V W X Y Z — See also

- †Nannosuchus
- †"Narynsuchus"
- †Navahosuchus — probable lapsus calami of Navajosuchus
- †Navajosuchus
- †Necrosuchus
- †Neoaetosauroides
- †Neosteneosaurus
- †Neptunidraco
- †Nettosuchus — junior synonym of Mourasuchus
- †Neustosaurus — possible senior synonym of Cricosaurus
- †Neuquensuchus
- †Nicrosaurus
- †Nominosuchus
- †Nordenosaurus
- †Nothochampsa — lapsus calami of Notochampsa
- †Notocaiman
- †Notochampsa

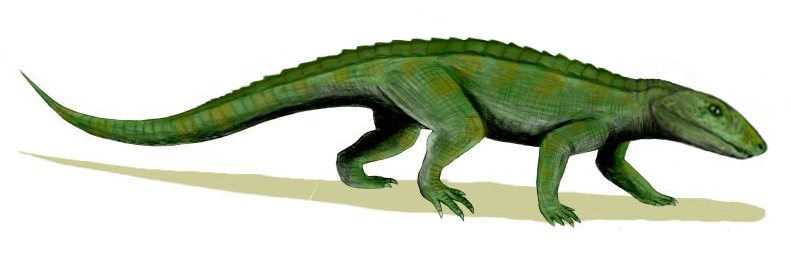
An artist's reconstruction of Notosuchus terristris.

- †Notosuchus
- †Nundasuchus

== O ==
Contents:	A B C D E F G H I J K L M N O P Q R S T U V W X Y Z — See also

- †Oceanosuchus
- †Ocepesuchus
- †Ogresuchus
- †Olkasuchus
- Oopholis — junior synonym of Crocodylus
- †Ophiussasuchus
- †Opisuchus
- †Orientalosuchus
- †Ornithosuchus
- †Orthogenysuchus
- †Orthosuchus
- Osteoblepharon — junior synonym of Osteolaemus

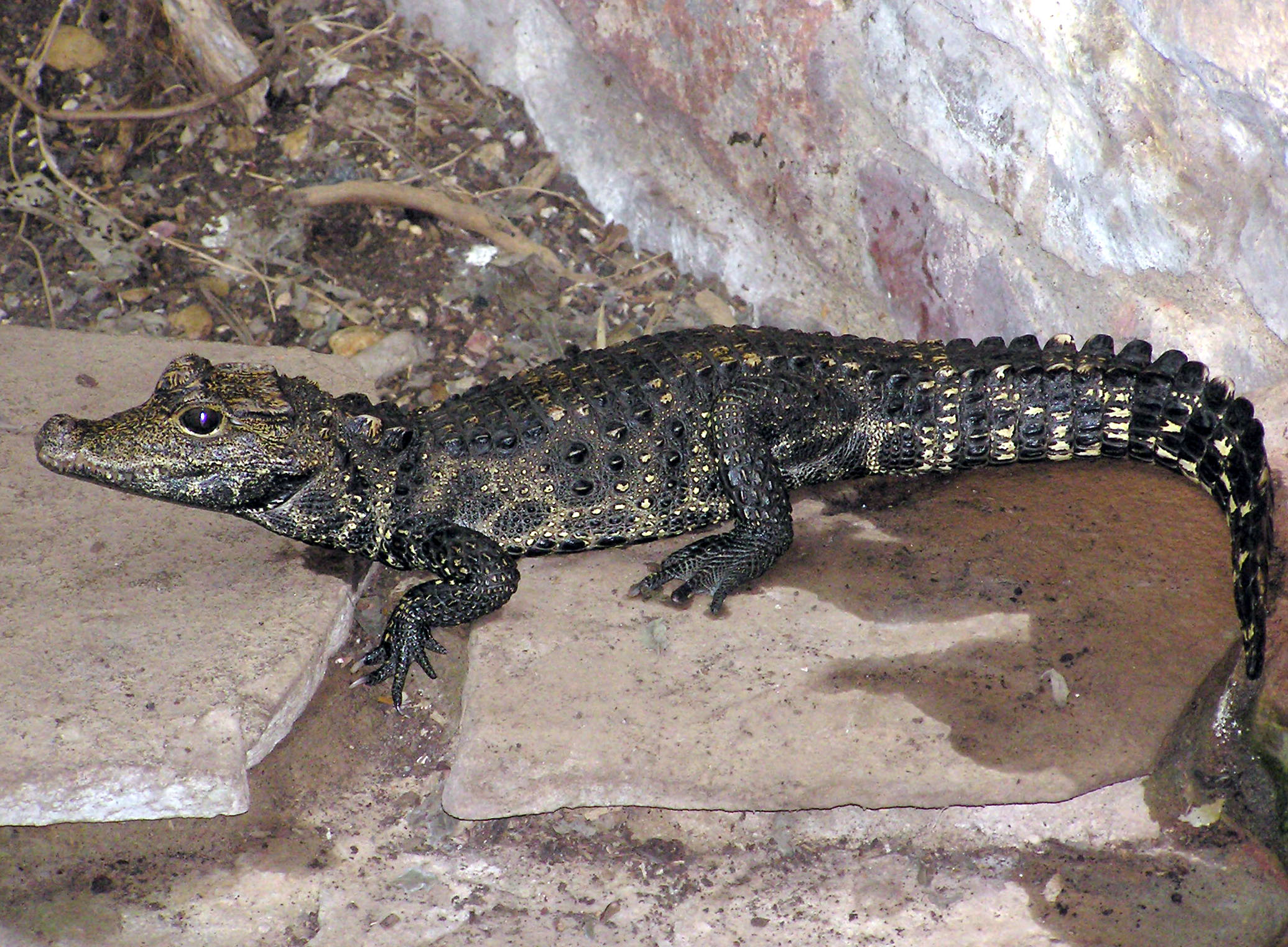
A dwarf crocodile (Osteolaemus) from west Africa.

- Osteolaemus
- †Oweniasuchus
- †Oxysdonsaurus

== P ==
Contents:	A B C D E F G H I J K L M N O P Q R S T U V W X Y Z — See also

- †Paarthurnax
- †Pabwehshi
- †Pachycheilosuchus
- †Pachysuchus — currently considered to be a sauropodomorph dinosaur
- †Pagosvenator
- †Pakasuchus
- †Paleorhinus
- †"Paleosaurus"
- Paleosuchus
- Palinia — junior synonym of Crocodylus
- †Pallimnarchus
- †Paludirex
- †Paluxysuchus
- †Paralligator
- †Paranacaiman
- †Paranasuchus
- †Parasuchus
- †Paratomistoma
- †Paratypothorax
- †Parringtonia
- †Parrishia
- †Parvosuchus
- †Patagosuchus
- †Pattisaura
- †Pedeticosaurus
- †Pehuenchesuchus
- †Peipehsuchus
- †Peirosaurus
- †Pekinosaurus — probable junior synonym of Revueltosaurus

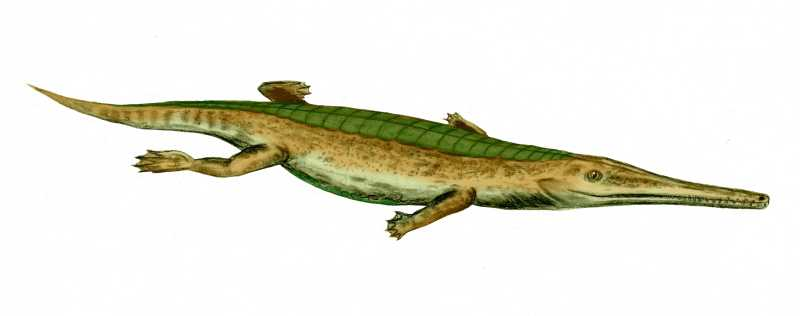
An artist's reconstruction of Pelagosaurus typus.

- †Pelagosaurus
- †Penghusuchus
- †Pepesuchus
- Perosuchus — junior synonym of Caiman
- †Petrosuchus — chimera of material from Goniopholis simus (lower jaw) and Pholidosaurus purbeckensis (cranium)
- Philas — junior synonym of Crocodylus
- †Phobosuchus — junior synonym of Deinosuchus
- †Pholidosaurus
- †Phosphatosaurus
- †Phyllodontosuchus
- †Phytosaurus
- †Pietraroiasuchus
- †Pinacosuchus
- †Piscogavialis
- †Pissarrachampsa
- †Plagiophthalmosuchus
- †Planocrania
- †Platyognathus
- †Platysuchus
- †Plerodon — junior synonym of Diplocynodon
- †Plesiosuchus
- †Pliogonodon — possible synonym of Deinosuchus
- †Polesinesuchus
- †Polonosuchus
- †Polydectes — synonym of Deinosuchus
- †Poposaurus
- †Portugalosuchus
- †Postosuchus
- †Pravusuchus
- †Prestosuchus
- †Pristichampsus
- †Procaimanoidea
- †Procerosuchus
- †Prodiplocynodon
- †Proexochokefalos
- †Promystriosuchus
- †Protoalligator
- †Protocaiman
- †Protome
- †Protosuchus
- †Pseudhesperosuchus
- †Pseudogavialis
- †Pseudopalatus — junior synonym of Machaeroprosopus
- †Purranisaurus

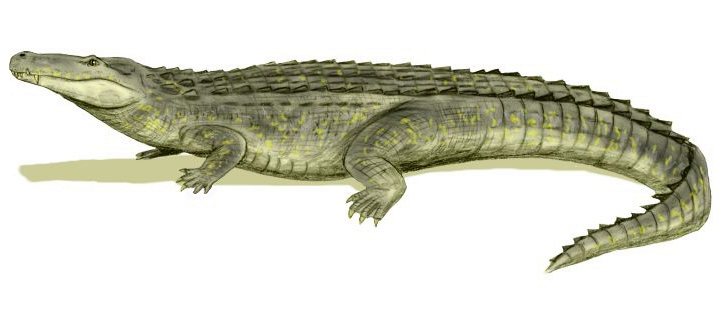
An artist's reconstruction of Purussaurus.

- †Purussaurus
- Pyrenodon — junior synonym of Tomistoma

== Q ==
Contents:	A B C D E F G H I J K L M N O P Q R S T U V W X Y Z — See also

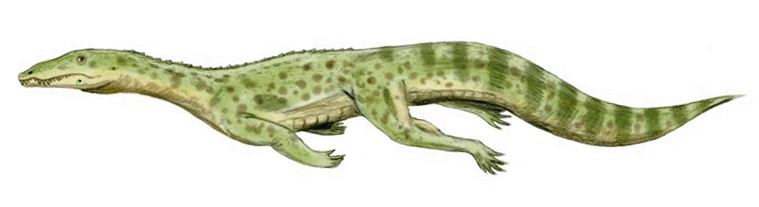
An artist's reconstruction of Qianosuchus

- †Qianosuchus
- †Qianshanosuchus
- †Quinkana

== R ==
Contents:	A B C D E F G H I J K L M N O P Q R S T U V W X Y Z — See also

- †Rauisuchus
- †Redondasaurus
- †Redondasuchus
- †Redondavenator
- †Revueltosaurus
- †Rhabdognathus
- †Rhabdosaurus — junior synonym of Rhabdognathus
- †Rhacheosaurus
- †Rhadinosaurus — possible junior synonym of Doratodon
- †Rhamphocephalus
- †Rhamphosuchus
- Rhynchosuchus — junior synonym of Tomistoma
- †Rileyasuchus
- †Rimasuchus
- †Rioarribasuchus — possible junior synonym of Heliocanthus
- †Riojasuchus
- †Rodeosuchus
- †Roxochampsa
- †Rugosuchus
- †Rukwasuchus

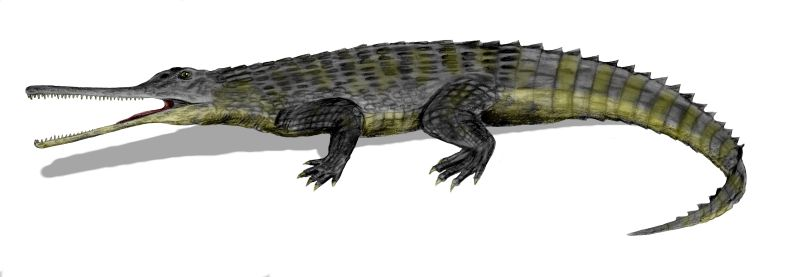
An artist's reconstruction of Rutiodon.

- †Rutiodon

== S ==
Contents:	A B C D E F G H I J K L M N O P Q R S T U V W X Y Z — See also

- †Sabinosuchus
- †Sabresuchus
- †Sacacosuchus
- †Sahitisuchus
- †Saltoposuchus
- †Sajkanosuchus
- †Sarcosuchus
- †Saurocainus — junior synonym of Diplocynodon
- †Saurosuchus
- †Schultzsuchus
- †Scolomastax
- †Scolotosuchus
- †Scutarx
- †Scythosuchus
- †Sebecus
- †Seldsienean
- †Sericodon
- †Shamosuchus
- †Shantungosuchus
- †Shartegosuchus
- †Shuvosaurus
- †Siamosuchus
- †Sichuanosuchus
- †Sierritasuchus
- †Sillosuchus
- †Simosuchus
- †Sinosaurus — currently considered to be a theropod dinosaur
- †Siquisiquesuchus
- †Sissokosuchus
- †Smilosuchus
- †Smok — a possible rauisuchian
- †Sokotosaurus — junior synonym of Hyposaurus
- †Sokotosuchus
- †Sphagesaurus
- †Sphenosuchus
- †Stagonolepis

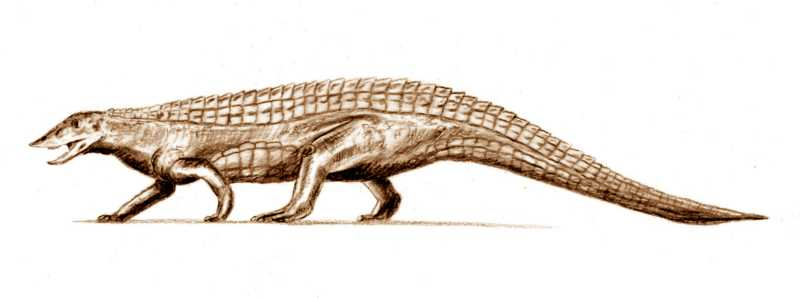
An artist's Stagonolepis.

- †Stagonosuchus
- †Stangerochampsa
- †Stegomosuchus
- †Stegomus
- †Steneosaurus
- †Stenomyti
- †Stolokrosuchus
- †Stomatosuchus
- †Stratiotosuchus
- †Strigosuchus
- †Stromerosuchus
- †Suchodus
- †Suchosaurus — a spinosaurid dinosaur
- †Sulcusuchus — first described as a dyrosaurid, reidentified as a polycotylid plesiosaur
- †Sunosuchus
- †Susisuchus
- †Sutekhsuchus
- †Symptosuchus

== T ==
Contents:	A B C D E F G H I J K L M N O P Q R S T U V W X Y Z — See also

- †Tadzhikosuchus
- †Tagarosuchus
- †Taihangosuchus
- †Tainrakuasuchus
- †Tarjadia
- †Tarsomordeo
- †Tecovasuchus
- †Teleidosaurus
- †Teleorhinus — junior synonym of Terminonaris
- †Teleosaurus
- †Temsacus — junior synonym of Crocodylus
- †Teratosaurus
- †Terminonaris
- †Terrestrisuchus
- †Tewkensuchus
- †Thalattosuchus
- †Thecachampsa
- †Thecachampsoides — junior synonym of Eosuchus
- †Theriosuchus
- †Thikarisuchus
- †Thilastikosuchus
- †Thoracosaurus
- †Ticinosuchus
- †Tienosuchus
- †Tikisuchus
- †Tilemsisuchus
- †Titanochampsa

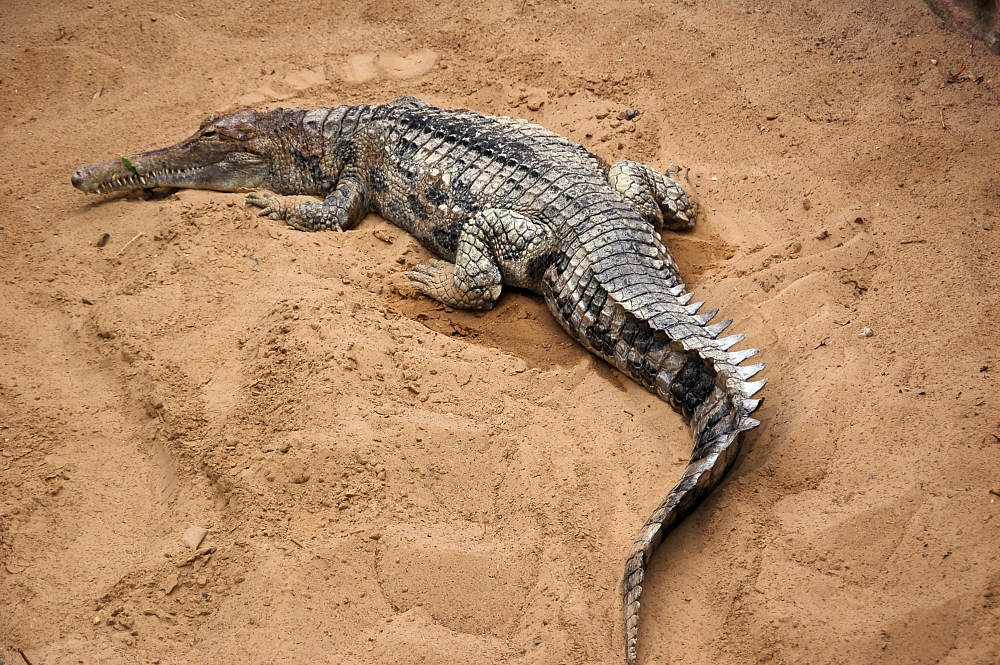
A false gharial (Tomistoma) from Thailand.

- Tomistoma
- †Torvoneustes
- †Toyotamaphimeia
- †Trematochampsa
- †Trialestes
- †Trilophosuchus
- †Tsoabichi
- †Tsylmosuchus
- †Turanosuchus
- †Turcosuchus
- †Turfanosuchus
- †Turnersuchus
- †Typothorax
- †Tyrannoneustes
- †Tzaganosuchus

== U ==
Contents:	A B C D E F G H I J K L M N O P Q R S T U V W X Y Z — See also

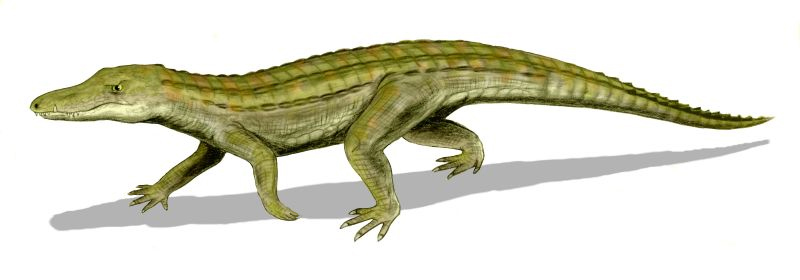
An artist's reconstruction of Uberabasuchus.

- †Uberabasuchus
- †Ultrastenos
- †Unasuchus
- †Uruguaysuchus

== V ==
Contents:	A B C D E F G H I J K L M N O P Q R S T U V W X Y Z — See also

- †Varanosuchus
- †Vectisuchus

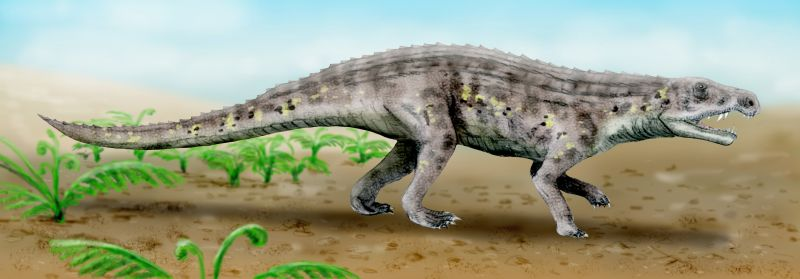
An artist's reconstruction of Venaticosuchus rusconii.

- †Venaticosuchus
- †Venkatasuchus
- †Vivaron
- †Vjushkovisaurus
- †Voay
- †Volia
- †Vytshegdosuchus

== W ==
Contents:	A B C D E F G H I J K L M N O P Q R S T U V W X Y Z — See also

- †Wadisuchus
- †Wahasuchus
- †Wannaganosuchus
- †Wannchampsus
- †Wanosuchus
- †Wargosuchus
- †Weigeltisuchus — junior synonym of Boverisuchus
- †Woodbinesuchus
- †Wurnosaurus — junior synonym of Hyposaurus

== X ==
Contents:	A B C D E F G H I J K L M N O P Q R S T U V W X Y Z — See also

- †Xenosuchus — junior synonym of Caiman
- †Xilousuchus

== Y ==
Contents:	A B C D E F G H I J K L M N O P Q R S T U V W X Y Z — See also

- †Yacarerani
- †Yanjisuchus
- †Yonghesuchus
- †Youngosuchus
- †Yvridiosuchus

== Z ==
Contents:	A B C D E F G H I J K L M N O P Q R S T U V W X Y Z — See also

- †Zaraasuchus

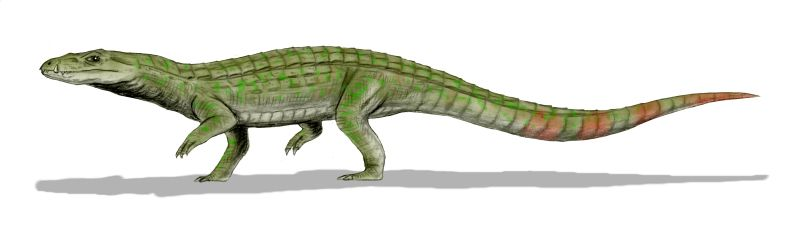
An artist's reconstruction of Zosuchus davidsoni.

- †Zatomus
- †Zholsuchus
- †Zhyrasuchus
- †Zoneait
- †Zosuchus
- †Zulmasuchus
