= Olkasuchus =

Olkasuchus Temporal range: Late Triassic (Norian), ~227–213 Ma

Scientific classification
- Kingdom: Animalia
- Phylum: Chordata
- Class: Reptilia
- Clade: Pseudosuchia
- Order: †Aetosauria
- Family: †Stagonolepididae
- Subfamily: †Desmatosuchinae
- Genus: †Olkasuchus; Sotomayor et al., 2025
- Species: †O. walasto

Binomial name
- †Olkasuchus walasto Sotomayor et al., 2025

Genus of aetosaurian reptiles

Olkasuchus is an extinct genus of desmatosuchine aetosaur known from the Late Triassic (Norian age) Los Colorados Formation of northwestern Argentina. The genus contains a single species, Olkasuchus walasto, known from a partial skeleton with preserved osteoderms.

== Discovery and naming ==
The Olkasuchus holotype specimen, PULR-V 246, was discovered in outcrops of the upper Los Colorados Formation ('La Esquina' locality) within Talampaya National Park in La Rioja Province, Argentina. The specimen comprises an incomplete, partially articulated skeleton including vertebrae, ribs, a partial right scapulocoracoid, humerus, pelvic girdle, femur, tibia, and fibula. Several osteoderms are preserved from the dorsal, ventral, sacral, and caudal regions.

In 2025, Juan C. Sotomayor and colleagues described Olkasuchus walasto as a new genus and species of desmatosuchine aetosaurs based on these fossil remains. The generic name, Olkasuchus, combines ólka, a word from the now-extinct Kakán language spoken by the native people who inhabited the type locality region, meaning "red", with the Greek word soûkhos (suchus), derived from the Greek name of Sobek, the crocodile-headed deity of Ancient Egyptian myth. This refers to the red-colored outcrops of the Los Colorados Formation in which the holotype was found. The specific name, walasto, is a Kakán word meaning "corner", referencing the type locality of La Esquina, which is in turn a Spanish word for "corner".

== Classification ==
In their phylogenetic analysis, Sotomayor and colleagues recovered Olkasuchus as the sister taxon of Neoaetosauroides, the only other aetosaur known from the Los Colorados Formation, as the earliest-diverging group within the stagonolepidid clade Desmatosuchinae, sister to all other members of the clade. These results are displayed in the cladogram below:

- Aetosauria
  - Aetosauroides scagliai
  - Stagonolepididae
    - Aetosaurinae
    - Stagonolepidoidea
      - Stenomyti huangae
      - Desmatosuchinae
        - - Neoaetosauroides engaeus
          - Olkasuchus walasto
        - - Calyptosuchus wellesi
          - - - Adamanasuchus eisenhardtae
              - Scutarx deltatylus
            - - Stagonolepis robertsoni
              - - Stagonolepis olenkae
                - - Garzapelta muelleri
                  - Desmatosuchini
                    - Gorgetosuchus pekinensis
                    - - Longosuchus meadei
                      - - Sierritasuchus macalpini
                        - - Lucasuchus hunti
                          - - Desmatosuchus smalli
                            - Desmatosuchus spurensis
