= Chapelton Formation =

- Stratigraphic range: Eocene
- Type: Formation

Location
- Country: Jamaica

The Chapelton Formation is a geologic formation in Jamaica. It preserves fossils dating back to the Paleogene period, Eocene epoch. Fossils of the possible species Charactosuchus kugleri have been found in the formation.

== See also ==
- List of fossiliferous stratigraphic units in Jamaica
