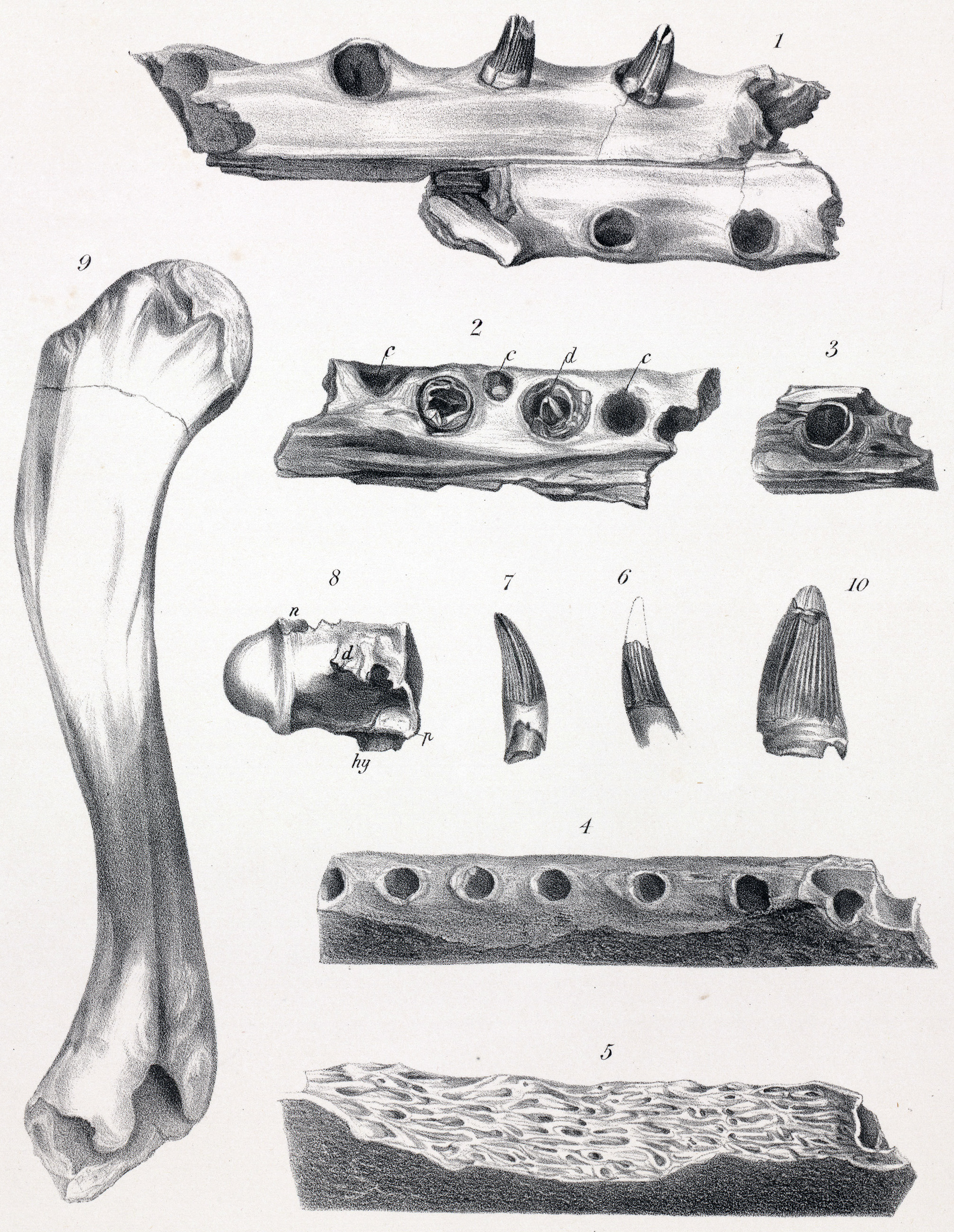
- Fossils referred to Gavialis dixoni (now Dollosuchus dixoni) by Richard Owen

Scientific classification
- Kingdom: Animalia
- Phylum: Chordata
- Class: Reptilia
- Clade: Archosauria
- Order: Crocodilia
- Family: Gavialidae
- Subfamily: Tomistominae
- Genus: †Dollosuchus; Swinton, 1937 vide Owen, 1850

Type species
- †Dollosuchus dixoni Owen, 1850

Synonyms
- Brasilosuchus mendesi? Souza-Filho & Bocquetin-Villanueva, 1989; Charactosuchus kugleri? Berg, 1969; Kentisuchus spenceri? Mook, 1955; Gavialis dixoni Owen, 1849; Megadontosuchus arduini? Mook, 1955

= Dollosuchus =

Dollosuchus Temporal range: Early Eocene–Middle Eocene

Extinct genus of reptiles

Dollosuchus (meaning "Louis Dollo's crocodile") is an extinct monospecific genus of tomistomine crocodilian originally named as a species of Gavialis. It is a basal form possibly related to Kentisuchus, according to several phylogenetic analyses that have been conducted in recent years, and is the oldest known tomistomine to date. Fossils have been found from Belgium and the United Kingdom. It had large supratemporal fenestrae in relation to its orbits, similar to Kentisuchus and Thecachampsa.

Dollosuchus was originally described on the basis of numerous mandibular fragments found from the Early to Middle Eocene Bracklesham Beds Formation in the United Kingdom. The material cannot be distinguished from other related longirostrine, or long-snouted, crocodilians. A nearly complete skeleton from Belgium (IRScNB 482) discovered in 1915 and described by Swinton in 1937, and referred to Dollosuchus, formed the basis of the new taxon Dollosuchoides densmorei. The holotype, BMNH 26125 and BMNH 26126, is now on display at the World of Kina museum in Ghent, Belgium.

== Species ==
The type species of Dollosuchus is D. dixoni. Many other species that once belonged to other genera have been proposed as members of the genus, but little work has been published to support these claims. Charactosuchus kugleri, another Eocene crocodilian, has been suggested to be synonymous with Dollosuchus, but this is no longer likely because C. kugleri is now thought to be a member of the family Crocodylidae, and thus closer related to modern crocodiles than to gharials. It has been suggested that Kentisuchus spenceri, Megadontosuchus arduini, and Dollosuchus dixoni are cogeneric. If this is the case, the genus name Dollosuchus would be adopted for all three species, as the name has seniority over the other two.
