= Lianghusuchus =

Lianghusuchus Temporal range: Eocene, 48.6–37.2 Ma

Scientific classification
- Kingdom: Animalia
- Phylum: Chordata
- Class: Reptilia
- Clade: Archosauria
- Order: Crocodilia
- Family: Alligatoridae
- Genus: †Lianghusuchus; Young, 1948

Type species
- †Lianghusuchus hengyangensis Young, 1948

Extinct genus of reptiles

Lianghusuchus is an extinct monospecific genus of crocodilian. Fossils date back to the Eocene and have been found from Hunan, China. The type species is Lianghusuchus hengyangensis, named in 1948. It was originally considered a crocodile belonging to the family Crocodylidae, but was later considered a member of the alligator family Alligatoridae in a 1999 phylogenetic study by Christopher Brochu.
