= Mesorhinosuchus =

Mesorhinosuchus Temporal range: Early Triassic, Olenekian

Scientific classification
- Domain: Eukaryota
- Kingdom: Animalia
- Phylum: Chordata
- Class: Reptilia
- Clade: Archosauromorpha
- Clade: Archosauriformes
- Order: †Phytosauria
- Genus: †Mesorhinosuchus; Kuhn, 1961

Type species
- †Mesorhinus fraasi Jaekel, 1910

Synonyms
- Mesorhinosaurus fraasi (Jaekel, 1910); Mesosuchus fraasi (Jaekel, 1910); Paleorhinus fraasi (Jaekel, 1910); Parasuchus fraasi (Jaekel, 1910)

Extinct genus of reptiles

Mesorhinosuchus ("middle nose crocodile") is an extinct genus of basal phytosaur possibly known from the Early Triassic (early Olenekian stage) of Saxony-Anhalt, central-eastern Germany. It was first named by Otto Jaekel in 1910 and the type species is Mesorhinus fraasi. The generic name Mesorhinus was preoccupied by Mesorhinus piramydatus, a macraucheniid mammal, which is now considered to be a junior synonym of Oxyodontherium. Thus, an alternative generic name, Mesorhinosuchus, was proposed by Oskar Kuhn in 1961. The genus is occasionally misspelled as Mesorhinosaurus, while Stocker and Butler's study in 2013 misspelled its original generic name as Mesosuchus.

Jaekel originally described the taxon on the basis of a single specimen he found in the collections of the University of Göttingen, with a label that identified it as a temnospondyl from the Lower Buntsandstein (Early Triassic) of Saxony-Anhalt. The holotype, an unnumbered GZG partial skull with the anterior tip missing, was destroyed during World War II. According to Stocker and Butler, based on the photograph in the original description, the holotype skull was undoubtedly phytosaurian, making it putatively the stratigraphically-lowest phytosaur known. Jaekel found a potential match of the sediment in which the skull was preserved to the Wipperbrücke, Parforcehaus locality, a horizon at the very base of the Middle Buntsandstein near Bernburg. This would make the specimen early Olenekian (Smithian) in age. However, because the holotype was destroyed with no surviving casts, and its provenance cannot be confirmed without new specimens, it have been largely ignored by recent authors, or assumed that its reported stratigraphic occurrence was incorrect. Various authors referred M. fraasi to as Paleorhinus fraasi or Parasuchus fraasi, while a more recent review of the Phytosauria by Stocker and Butler refrained from doing so, assigning it to Phytosauria incertae sedis.
