= Hoplitosuchus =

Hoplitosuchus Temporal range: Late Triassic, ~237–228 Ma

Scientific classification
- Kingdom: Animalia
- Phylum: Chordata
- Class: Sauropsida
- Order: †Aetosauria
- Family: †Stagonolepididae
- Genus: †Hoplitosuchus von Huene, 1938

Binomial name
- †Hoplitosuchus raui von Huene, 1938

Extinct genus of reptiles

Hoplitosuchus is an extinct genus of aetosaur. Fossils have been found from the Santa Maria Formation in Rio Grande do Sul, Brazil that date back to the Late Triassic. At first the genus was named Hoplitosaurus, but this name had previously been assigned to a polacanthine ankylosaurian dinosaur in 1902, thirty-six years before it had been referred to the aetosaur. Thus Hoplitosuchus was constructed as a replacement name for Hoplitosaurus. Because the holotype specimen consists of unidentifiable osteoderms and any other material attributed to the genus may actually be considered a composite of rauisuchian and dinosaurian remains, Hoplitosuchus is now considered to be a nomen dubium. The saurischian dinosaur Teyuwasu (now Staurikosaurus) was named in 1999 on the basis of material originally attributed to Hoplitosuchus.
