= Tienosuchus =

Tienosuchus Temporal range: Eocene

Scientific classification
- Kingdom: Animalia
- Phylum: Chordata
- Class: Sauropsida
- Order: Crocodilia
- Superfamily: Gavialoidea
- Genus: Tienosuchus Young, 1949

Species
- T. hsiangi Young, 1949 (type)

Extinct genus of reptiles

Tienosuchus is a dubious extinct monospecific genus of gavialoid crocodilian. It is known from a single tooth and some postcranial remains collected from Eocene deposits in Hunan, China. It is closely related to the genus Thoracosaurus, and has traditionally been placed in the subfamily Thoracosaurinae. The subfamily is now considered to be a paraphyletic assemblage of basal gavialoids, and therefore not a true clade. Because the fragmentary remains provide little diagnostic value, the genus is now considered a nomen dubium.
