= Charactosuchus =

Charactosuchus Temporal range: ?Eocene & Mid-Late Miocene or ?Early Pliocene ~48.6–3.6 Ma

Scientific classification
- Kingdom: Animalia
- Phylum: Chordata
- Class: Reptilia
- Clade: Archosauria
- Order: Crocodilia
- Superfamily: Crocodyloidea
- Family: Crocodylidae
- Genus: †Charactosuchus; Langston, 1965

Species
- C. fieldsi Langston, 1965 (type); ?C. kugleri Berg, 1969; ?C. mendesi Souza Filho and Bocquentin, 1989; C. sansoai Souza Filho, 1991

Synonyms
- ?Brasilosuchus Souza Filho and Bocquentin, 1989

Extinct genus of reptiles

Charactosuchus is an extinct genus of crocodilian. It was assigned to the family Crocodylidae in 1988. Specimens have been found in Colombia, Brazil, Jamaica, and possibly Florida and South Carolina. It was gharial-like in appearance with its long narrow snout but bore no relation to them, being more closely related to modern crocodiles than to gharials.

== Species ==
=== South America ===
The type species, C. fieldsi, has been found from the Villavieja Formation at the Konzentrat-Lagerstätte La Venta in Colombia and dates back to the Middle Miocene (Laventan). It has also been found in the Mayoan to Montehermosan Urumaco Formation at Urumaco in Venezuela, and in the Solimões Formation in Acre State, Brazil, along with C. sansoai, and the possible species C. mendesi (sometimes assigned to Brasilosuchus).

=== Caribbean ===
In 1969, a lower jaw of a crocodilian that dated back to the Lutetian stage of the Eocene was found in the Chapelton Formation of Saint James Parish, Jamaica, and was described as belonging to a new species of Charactosuchus named C. kugleri. However, this species may be considered synonymous with Dollosuchus, according to later papers.

=== North America ===
Isolated teeth thought to be from the genus have been found from Florida and South Carolina and are of early Pliocene age. This was thought to be evidence of the interchange between North and South American faunas, with the genus first appearing in North America and then migrating down into Colombia and Brazil. This theory is no longer accepted, although the presence of Charactosuchus from Jamaica may suggest a European origin, with the genus migrating across either the De Geer or Thule land bridges.
