= Nordenosaurus =

Nordenosaurus Temporal range: Late Miocene

Scientific classification
- Kingdom: Animalia
- Phylum: Chordata
- Class: Reptilia
- Clade: Archosauria
- Clade: Pseudosuchia
- Clade: Crocodylomorpha
- Order: Crocodilia
- Genus: †Nordenosaurus; Holman, 1973

Species
- Nordenosaurus magnus Holman, 1973

Extinct genus of reptiles

Nordenosaurus is an extinct genus of crocodilian. When first named in 1973 the genus was thought to be a squamate and was assigned to the family Xenosauridae. A single frontal bone was found from the Norden Bridge locality of the lower Valentine Formation in Brown County, Nebraska, thought to date back to the late Miocene. The size of the bone was initially taken as evidence that it was a giant xenosaurid. The specific name of the type species, N. magnus, alludes to its extremely large size in comparison to other xenosaurids known at the time. In 1982, paleontologist Jacques Gauthier reinterpreted Nordenosaurus as a small crocodilian rather than a giant xenosaurid. The frontal bone is hour-glass shaped and covered in deep pits, unlike those of any lizard but similar to the frontals of most crocodilians.

Nordenosaurus was thought to have had an arboreal lifestyle before its reclassification.
