= Haematosaurus =

Haematosaurus Temporal range: Jurassic

Scientific classification
- Domain: Eukaryota
- Kingdom: Animalia
- Phylum: Chordata
- Class: Reptilia
- Clade: Archosauria
- Clade: Pseudosuchia
- Clade: Crocodylomorpha
- Clade: Crocodyliformes
- Suborder: †Thalattosuchia
- Family: †Teleosauridae
- Genus: †Haematosaurus; Kuhn, 1934

Type species
- Plesiosaurus lanceolatus (Sauvage, 1874)

Extinct genus of crocodilians

Haematosaurus is an extinct genus of teleosaurid thalattosuchian. Fossils have been found from Boulogne-sur-Mer in northern France of Jurassic age. It was originally thought to be a plesiosaur, and the type species was initially assigned to the genus Plesiosaurus in 1874, although it was later reassigned to the new genus in 1934. It is now known to have been a marine crocodylomorph. Due to the fragmentary nature of the material associated with the genus, it is currently regarded as a nomen dubium.
