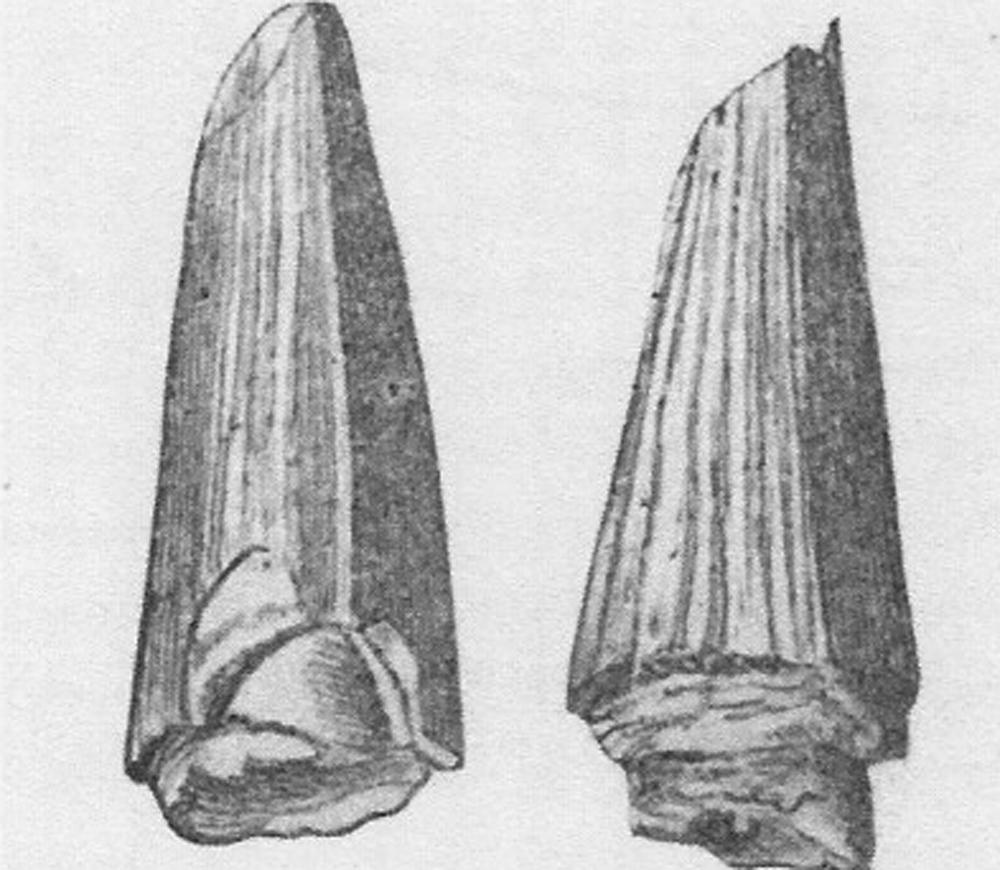
- Illustration of type specimen, 1858

Scientific classification
- Kingdom: Animalia
- Phylum: Chordata
- Class: Reptilia
- Clade: Archosauria
- Clade: Pseudosuchia
- Clade: Crocodylomorpha
- Clade: Neosuchia
- Genus: †Pliogonodon; Leidy, 1856

Species
- Pliogonodon priscus Leidy, 1856 (type)

= Pliogonodon =

Pliogonodon Temporal range: Late Cretaceous

Extinct genus of reptiles

Pliogonodon is an extinct genus of crocodylomorph. The type species, P. priscus, was named by Joseph Leidy in 1856. The holotype, known as USNM 7448, is a worn and broken tooth found from Phoebus Landing on the Cape Fear River in North Carolina. Although the age of the strata in which the tooth was found was not recorded, it is thought to have come from Miocene-age beds. The holotype and another tooth found at the same location are all that is known from the genus. The genus is considered a nomen dubium because of the lack of diagnostic features possessed by the teeth, and has been suggested to be synonymous with the alligatoroid Deinosuchus. Although Carroll (1988) assigned the genus to the basal neosuchian family Goniopholididae, current consensus is that Pligonodon is a Deinosuchus specimen.

The two teeth are conical and curve slightly inward, estimated to be around 2 inches (5.1 cm) in length if they had been fully preserved. The enamel is wrinkled and the base of the crowns are hollow.
