= Lucasuchus =

Lucasuchus Temporal range: Late Triassic, 221.5–205.6 Ma

Scientific classification
- Domain: Eukaryota
- Kingdom: Animalia
- Phylum: Chordata
- Class: Reptilia
- Clade: Archosauria
- Clade: Pseudosuchia
- Order: †Aetosauria
- Family: †Stagonolepididae
- Subfamily: †Desmatosuchinae
- Genus: †Lucasuchus; Long and Murry, 1995

Species
- †L. hunti Long and Murry, 1995 (type)

Extinct genus of reptiles

Lucasuchus is an extinct genus of aetosaur. Fossils have been found from the Bull Canyon Formation of the Dockum Group outcropping in the Revuelto Creek locality in Quay County, New Mexico. All specimens date back to the Norian stage of the Late Triassic. The genus was named in 1995 after the American paleontologist Spencer G. Lucas.

Lucasuchus was first proposed to be a junior subjective synonym of Longosuchus in 1999, and several other studies have also considered it to be an invalid genus. However, more recent studies concluded that Lucasuchus is not congeneric with any other known aetosaur genus, and is likely to be more closely related to Desmatosuchus and Acaenasuchus than to Longosuchus. The presence of elongate lateral osteoderm horns is shared by all of these genera, which make up the subfamily Desmatosuchinae.

It has been suggested that Lucasuchus is either a sexual dimorph belonging to the same species as Longosuchus meadei or an ontogenetic stage of the species (meaning that it represents one particular age group). However, several characteristics of Lucasuchus may indicate that it is indeed distinct from L. meadei rather than an example of morphological variation. For example, Lucasuchus has a clear radial pattern of pits and grooves on the paramedian osteoderms of the back while Longosuchus has only a random pattern of pits on the paramedians. In Lucasuchus, the paramedians have large conical eminences, or projections, while in Longosuchus these projections are only present in the form of low pyramidal bosses. Lucasuchus also lacks the emarginations (or notches) on the spikes of the lateral osteoderms that are seen in Longosuchus.
