= Helmstedtisuchus =

Helmstedtisuchus Temporal range: Late Eocene

Scientific classification
- Domain: Eukaryota
- Kingdom: Animalia
- Phylum: Chordata
- Class: Actinopterygii
- Order: Scombriformes
- Family: Scombridae
- Genus: †Helmstedtisuchus; Schleich, Vahldiek, Karl & Windolf, 1994

Type species
- Helmstedtisuchus freyi Schleich and Windolf, 1994

Extinct genus of fishes

Helmstedtisuchus is an extinct genus of fish. Fossils have been found from Helmstedt, Germany that are late Eocene in age. The genus was originally thought to be a eusuchian crocodylomorph, but it is now known to have been a scombrid teleostean fish.
