= Colossoemys =

Colossoemys Temporal range: Pleistocene

Scientific classification
- Kingdom: Animalia
- Phylum: Chordata
- Class: Reptilia
- Order: incertae sedis
- Genus: †Colossoemys; Rodrigues, 1892

Species
- C. macrococcygeana Rodrigues, 1892 (type)

Extinct genus of reptiles

Colossoemys is the nomen dubium of an extinct genus of alligatoroid crocodilian. Based on fossils found in the Solimões Formation, the finds were assigned to Emys macrococcygeanus, a turtle that would have inhabited the Amazon Basin of South America during the Pleistocene epoch. The genus was originally named on the basis of two large procoelous vertebrae, a pubis, and a plastral fragment (likely to be from a turtle rather than a crocodilian). The paucity of material associated with the genus has led Colossoemys to be considered a nomen dubium.
