= Dzungarisuchus =

Dzungarisuchus Temporal range: Late Eocene, 38–33.9 Ma

Scientific classification
- Domain: Eukaryota
- Kingdom: Animalia
- Phylum: Chordata
- Class: Reptilia
- Clade: Archosauromorpha
- Clade: Archosauriformes
- Order: Crocodilia
- Family: Crocodylidae
- Genus: †Dzungarisuchus; Dong, 1974

Type species
- †Dzungarisuchus manacensis Dong, 1974

Extinct genus of reptiles

Dzungarisuchus is an extinct monospecific genus of crocodile. Fossils have been found from Xinjiang, China of late Eocene age. The only remains that have been found have been isolated postcranial and jaw fragments. As a result, the genus is poorly known. All material yet found has been referable to the type species, Dzungarisuchus manacensis.
