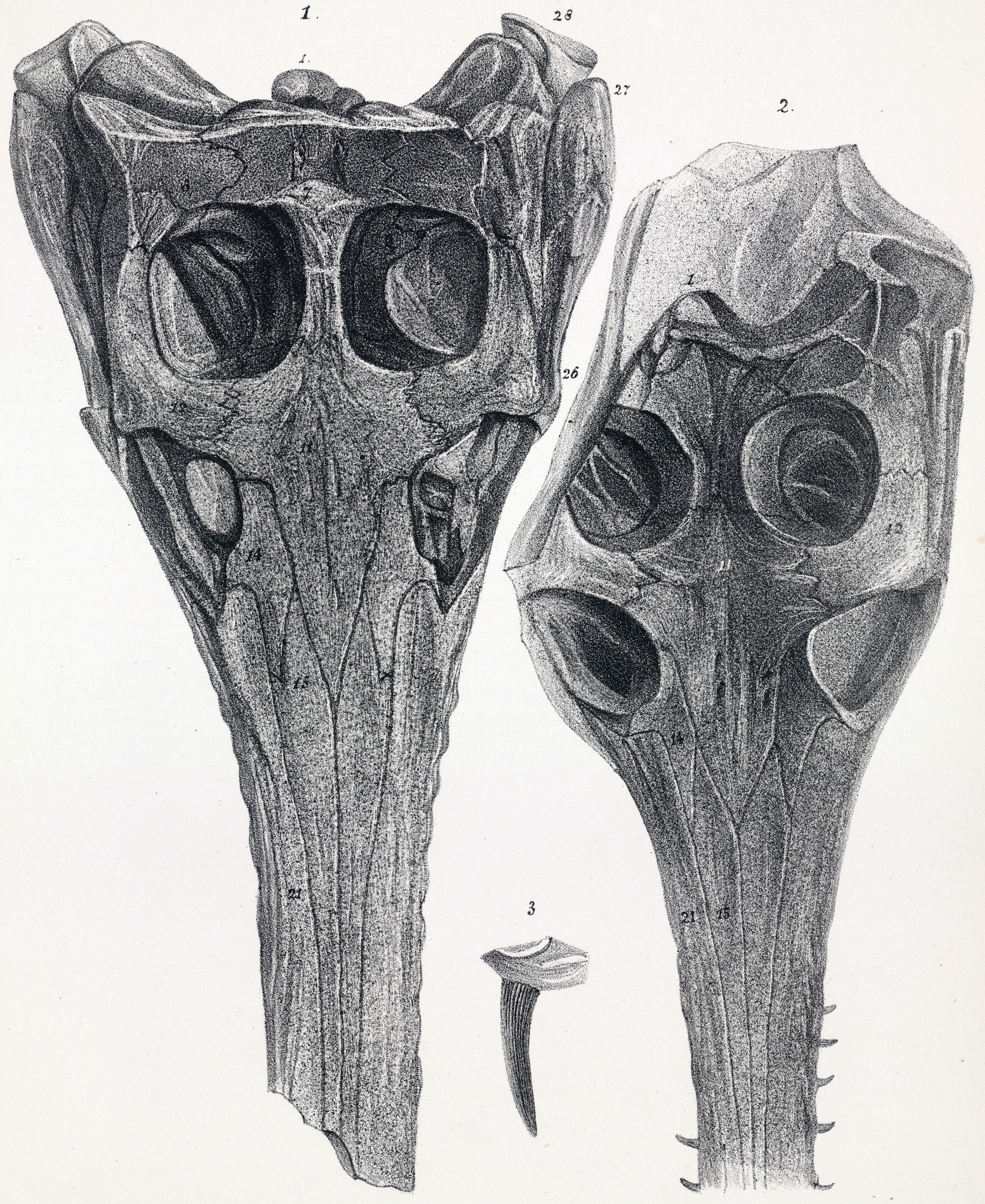
- Skulls of A. geoffroyi and A. laticeps

Scientific classification
- Kingdom: Animalia
- Phylum: Chordata
- Class: Reptilia
- Clade: Archosauria
- Clade: Pseudosuchia
- Clade: Crocodylomorpha
- Family: †Pholidosauridae
- Genus: †Anglosuchus; Mook, 1942

Species
- †A. geoffroyi (Richard Owen, 1884 (originally Steneosaurus geoffroyi)) (type); †A. laticeps (Richard Owen, 1884 (originally Steneosaurus laticeps))

= Anglosuchus =

Anglosuchus Temporal range: 175–170 Ma Bajocian - Bathonian

Extinct genus of reptiles

Anglosuchus is an extinct genus of pholidosaurid mesoeucrocodylian. Both species of Anglosuchus were originally assigned to the genus Steneosaurus by Richard Owen in 1884, but were later placed in the new genus. It was once thought to be a teleosaurid but later reassigned to the family Pholidosauridae.
