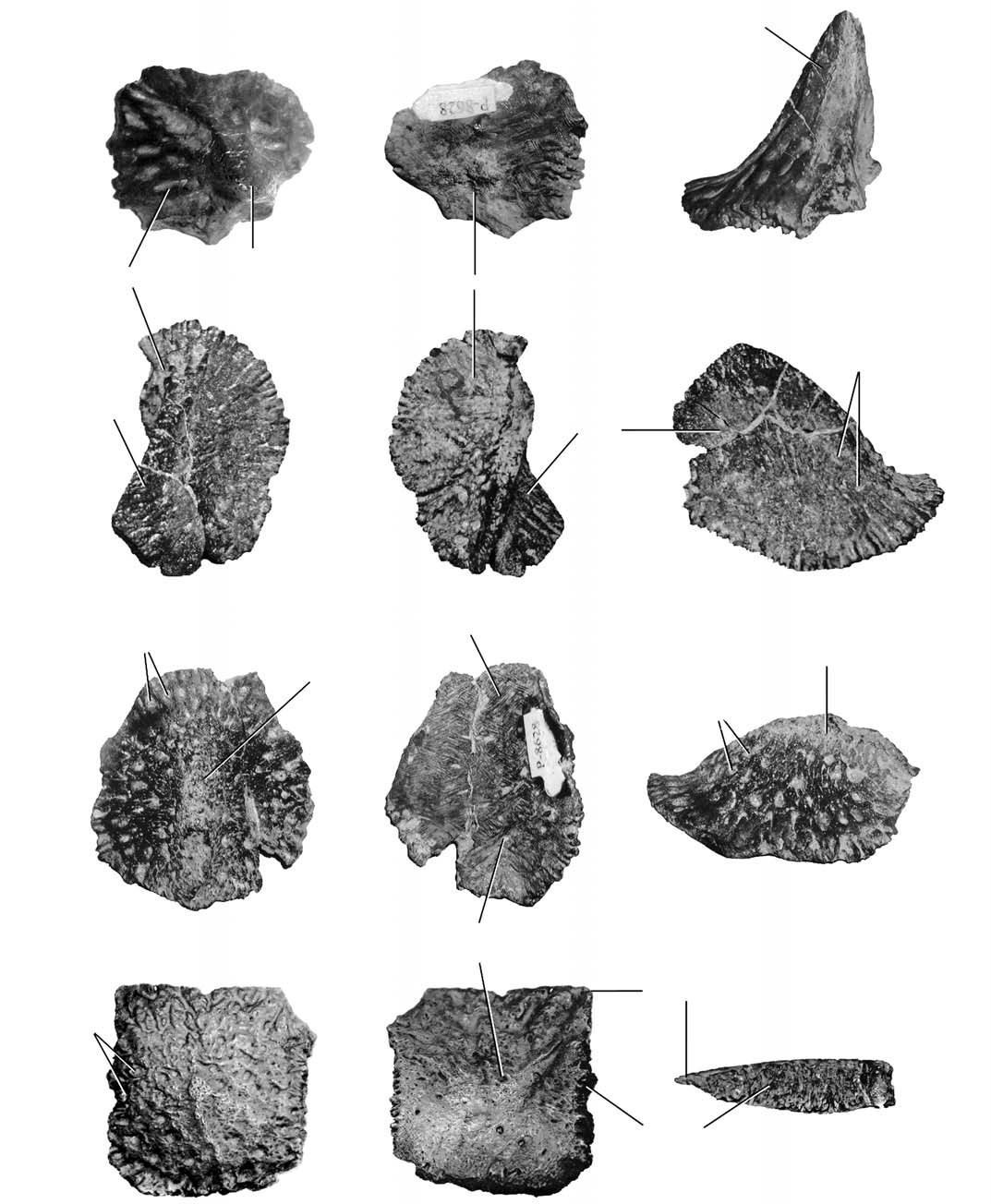
- Osteoderms
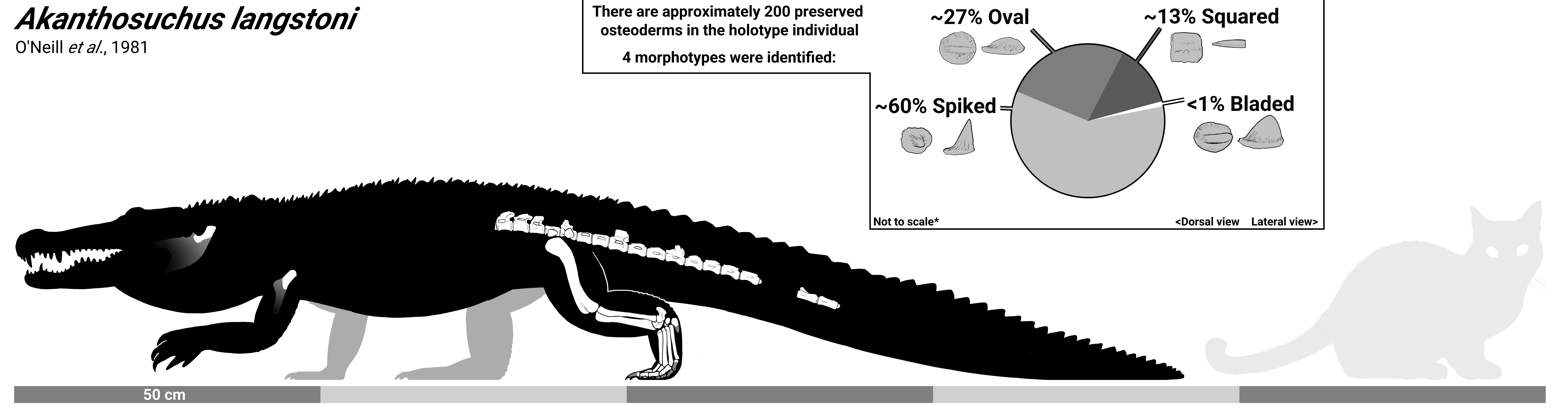
- Diagram of the known remains

Scientific classification
- Kingdom: Animalia
- Phylum: Chordata
- Class: Reptilia
- Clade: Archosauria
- Order: Crocodilia
- Family: Alligatoridae
- Subfamily: Alligatorinae
- Genus: †Akanthosuchus; O'Neill, Lucas, and Kues, 1981

Species
- †A. langstoni O'Neill et al., 1981 (type)

= Akanthosuchus =

Akanthosuchus Temporal range: 64.5–61.0 Ma Paleocene

Extinct genus of reptiles

Akanthosuchus ("spine crocodile", referring to its dermal armor) is an extinct genus of alligatoroid crocodilian, and has been regarded as a possible alligatorine. Fossils are known from the Paleocene-aged Nacimiento Formation of the San Juan Basin in New Mexico, United States. The genus is represented by a partial skeleton and isolated osteoderms (bony armor). The osteoderms have been described as distinctive, including both spike-shaped and blade-shaped elements.

== History and description ==
Akanthosuchus is based on NMMNH NP-139, a partial skeleton lacking the skull. The specimen was found in a concretionary sandstone lens with the anterior portion eroding out. It was discovered in Torrejon Wash, northwestern Sandoval County, New Mexico. The hind legs, numerous back, hip, and tail vertebrae (28), and armor (about 200 scutes) were the primary elements preserved. F. Michael O'Neill et al. described the genus in 1981. The type species is A. langstoni, honoring paleontologist Wann Langston Jr., known for his work on fossil crocodilians.

Akanthosuchus was a moderately sized crocodilian. The thigh bone of NMMNH NP-139 was 137 millimetres (5.4 in) long, and the shin was 102 millimetres (4.0 in) long. However, this specimen may not have been fully grown. Based on growth rings, Hill and Lucas suggest that it was no younger than eight years old when it died. The tail may have been relatively short, given the reduction of bony projections on known tail vertebrae. The armor was unusual in having elongate spikes or broad blades. Its scutes came in four basic types: square (13%, keeled or unkeeled), oval (27%, keeled), bladed (<1%, similar to oval but with a much exaggerated triangular keel), and spiked (60%, square-based, conical and blunt). The spikes were nearly as tall as the base of their scutes were long, rising up to 29.0 millimetres (1.14 in). They contacted only one other scute each, and may have been arranged in paired sets down the midline of the back and tail, and along the sides of the animal. Single rows of paired oval scutes may have filled in between the spiked rows. The bladed scutes, an extreme of the oval scute form, may have been found at the ends of the oval scute rows. The square scutes may have been restricted to one area, such as the neck and shoulders, or they may represent the belly armor.

Spiked and bladed scutes are not unknown among crocodilians, although no other known crocodilian had or has both. O'Neill and colleagues compared Akanthosuchus to Pinacosuchus, a crocodylomorph with spiked scutes known from the Late Cretaceous North Horn Formation of Utah, but it differed from Akanthosuchus in several ways: it was much smaller (three to four times smaller than NMMNH NP-139), it had less derived vertebrae, and it lacked bladed scutes.

=== Classification ===
O'Neill et al. suggested that Akanthosuchus was an alligatorine, based on the characteristics of a partial lower jaw bone (retroarticular). They considered the possibility that Akanthosuchus is a postcranial skeleton of either Ceratosuchus or Navajosuchus, contemporaneous crocodilians known primarily from skulls, but elected to name a new genus instead. More recently, Hill and Lucas, using a cladistic analysis, rejected the hypothesis that Akanthosuchus is the same as either Ceratosuchus or Navajosuchus, and found that Akanthosuchus is an alligatoroid. It tended to sort out with alligatorines, but Hill and Lucas found that this was weakly supported in their analysis.

== Distribution ==
NMMNH NP-139 came from the upper part of the Torrejonian portion of the Nacimiento Formation. Later work identified Akanthosuchus langstoni from the older Puercan-age portion of the Nacimiento Formation as well, which gives the genus a range including much of the Nacimiento Formation, deposited between approximately 64.5 and 61.0 million years ago. A scute and femur from the De-Na-Zin Member of the late Campanian-age (Late Cretaceous) Kirtland Formation are similar to the corresponding elements of Akanthosuchus, but cannot be conclusively assigned to the genus at this time. This material is also from the San Juan Basin.

== Paleobiology ==
The Nacimiento Formation is interpreted as having had a fluvial and lacustrine depositional setting. O'Neill et al. interpreted Akanthosuchus as either a terrestrial crocodilian or a specialized, modestly sized, heavily armored aquatic crocodilian.
