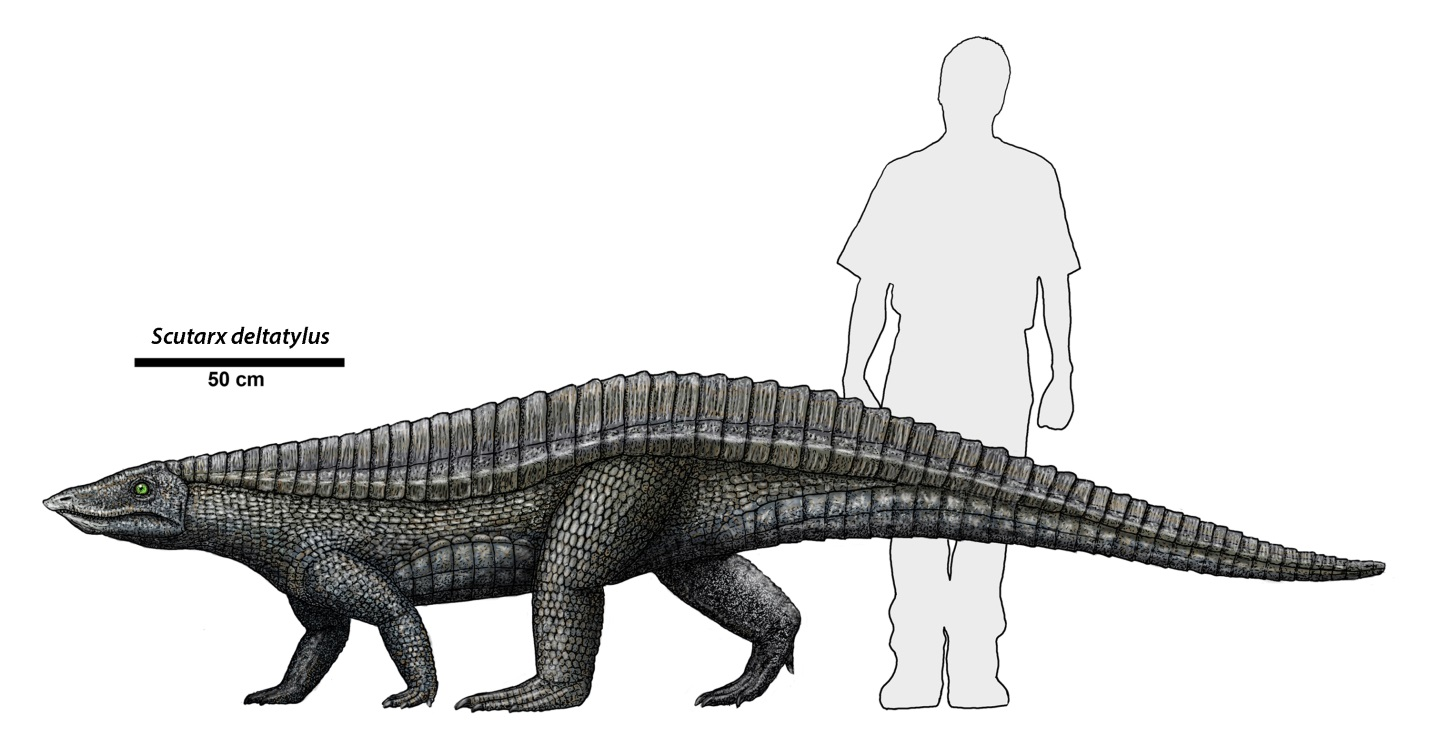
- Life restoration and size diagram

Scientific classification
- Kingdom: Animalia
- Phylum: Chordata
- Class: Reptilia
- Clade: Pseudosuchia
- Clade: †Aetosauriformes
- Order: †Aetosauria
- Family: †Stagonolepididae
- Genus: †Scutarx; Parker, 2016

Type species
- †Scutarx deltatylus Parker, 2016

= Scutarx =

Scutarx Temporal range: Late Triassic, Carnian–Norian

Extinct genus of reptiles

Scutarx is an extinct genus of aetosauriform, most commonly regarded by its species name Scutarx deltatylus (Scutarx Latin for "shield fortress" -scutum meaning "shield" and -arx meaning "fortress"; deltatylus Greek for "triangular protuberance" -delta meaning triangle and -tylos meaning "knob, knot, swelling, callous, protuberance"). Scutarx lived around 230 million years ago during the Carnian and Norian stages of the Late Triassic. Scutarx is a medium-sized reptile with osteoderms belonging to the Aetosauria, a heavily armored and more herbivorous clade of pseudosuchians.

The presence of a large, triangular boss in the posteromedial corner of the dorsal surface of the dorsal paramedian osteoderms is the primary morphological characteristic that distinguishes Scutarx from other aetosaurs. Both morphologically and stratigraphically, Scutarx can be distinguished from the closely related taxa Calyptosuchus wellesi and Adamanasuchus eisenhardtae. Because of this, Scutarx is prevalent in the fossil record because it may be an indicator taxon for the late Adamanian biozone.

== History of discovery ==
Fossils of Scutarx have been found in the Triassic Chinle Formation of Petrified Forest National Park of Arizona and the Cooper Canyon Formation of Texas. Four partial skeletons including much of the carapace, vertebral column as well as the shoulder and pelvic girdles have been collected from PEFO between 2002 and 2009. The locations where the Scutarx fossils were gathered are all found in the lower Sonsela Member of the Chinle Formation. The Camp Butte, Lot's Wife, Jasper Forest, Jim Camp Wash, and Martha's Butte beds may be found in the PEFO area of the Sonsela Member. Lot's Wife, Jasper Forest, and Martha's Butte beds form cliffs, whereas the Lot's Wife and Marthas Butte beds are slope-forming units with a larger proportion of mudrocks than sandstones. These locations all show neighboring floodplain facies connected to a braided river system.

In Texas, the Cooper Canyon Formation's uppermost and the majority of its middle part are Revueltian in age. While the Scutarx fossils were found at around the same level as the lowest recorded occurrence of Machaeroprosopus, which indicates the local base of the Revueltian, this finding of Scutarx deltatylus is notable because it is from the lowermost Revueltian teilzone. With the sole other record being a reported specimen of Desmatosuchus smalli from the early Revueltian of Arizona, this significantly increases the record of non-desmatosuchin aetosaurs in the Revueltian.

Some of the most commonly discovered vertebrate fossils in the Petrified Forest National Park (PEFO), Arizona's Upper Triassic Chinle Formation are aetosaurs. Four fragmentary skeletons that were believed to be a new taxon were discovered during paleontological research in the park between 2001 and 2009. This genoholotype was later named in 2016 by William G. Parker as Scutarx.

== Classification ==
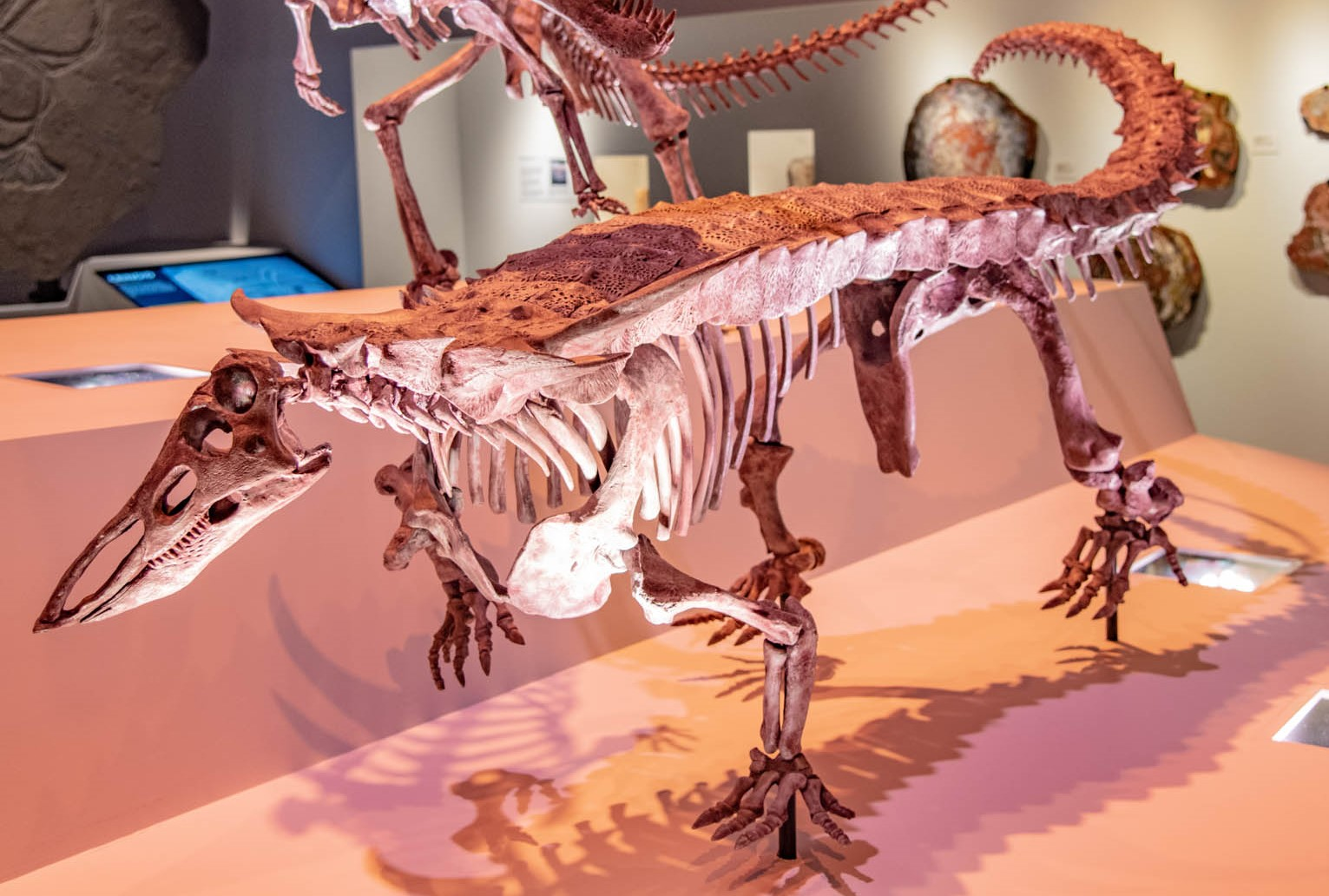
Desmatosuchus skeletal mount

Scutarx belongs to the family Stagonolepididae of the clade Aetosauriformes. The Late Triassic (Carnian/Norian) aetosaurs were armored archosaurian reptiles. They are commonly found in India, North Africa, North America, and South America. These rare, highly derived archosaurs are easily distinguished from other Triassic archosaurs by the presence of an elongated, occasionally spiky, premaxilla and substantial dermal armor.

Aetosauria is an early-diverging clade of pseudosuchians, which played a significant role in a variety of Late Triassic terrestrial faunas with a widespread range and high species diversity. Measuring between one and three meters in length, with strongly armored bodies and tails, it had a crucial ecological function of being the earliest and one of only two clades of big herbivorous archosaurs from the Late Triassic. Aetosauria is divided into two main clades: Desmatosuchia and Aetosaurinae. Scutarx deltatylus has been identified through phylogenetic analysis as the sister taxon of Adamanasuchus eisenhardtae and Calytosuchus wellesi, all forming a clade within Desmatosuchinae.

- Aetosauria
  - Aetosaurinae
  - Stagonolepidoidea
    - Stagonolepidinae
    - Desmatosuchinae
      - Desmatosuchini
      - - Adamanasuchus eisenhardtae
        - Calyptosuchus wellesi
        - Scutarx deltatylus

== Description ==
=== Skull ===
==== Nasal ====
The element's main body is thick in the dorsoventral region, and the dorsomedial portion of the element is slightly twisted such that the dorsal surface is visibly concave. A thin layer of hematite covers any surface ornamentation. The sutural surface for the ascending process of the maxilla is markedly posteroventrally concave. The dorsal edge of the external naris is formed by the anterior nasal narrowing mediolaterally.

==== Frontal ====
The frontal's exceptional dorsoventral thickness is obvious, with dorsoventral thickness 0.35 times the element's midline length. The posterior frontal edge is inclined posterolaterally in the dorsal view so that the lateral frontal margin is longer than the medial frontal margin, creating a separate posterolateral process. Its anterior part connects posteriorly to the parietal and laterally to the postfrontal. The frontal creates the dorsal edge of the orbit just in front of the posterolateral process.

The frontals' dorsal surfaces are rugose and decorated with deep indentations, some of which are connected to longer grooves. There are broader, anteroposteriorly directed grooves anteriorly and laterally over the rounded orbits that indicate the higher center of the frontals. The frontals' anterolateral edges are dorsoventrally thick, rugose, anteromedially sloping regions that are posteriorly bordered by a narrow, curving ridge. For articulation with the nasals, the front borders of the frontals are thick and rugose. Almost transverse is the frontal/nasal suture. The distinct, elevated midline ridge that is found in other aertosaurs is however absent from the frontal of Scutarx. The frontals' ventral surfaces are smooth and ventrally concave. The laterosphenoid joins the orbital fossa at a prominent, somewhat curved ridge that runs medially to the orbital fossa.

==== Parietal ====
The frontal/parietal suture is clearly apparent at the posterior boundary of the frontals, making it clear that these parts were not fused. The posterolateral section defines the dorsal boundary of the supratemporal fenestra. The top part of the skull's back is made up of posterior flanges posteroventrally sloping contours that make connection with the opisthotics' paroccipital processes ventrally. The posterior process of the squamosal is in touch with the parietal flanges laterally and the supraoccipital in medial position.

==== Parabasisphenoid ====
Unlike those of other aetosaurians like Stagonolepis robertsoni and Aetosauroides scagliai, the basal tubercle and the basipterygoid processes of Scutarx deltatylus have a broad contact and are not elongate. Scutarx deltatylus also possesses deep, round parabasisphenoid recess, a trait apomorphic to this taxon.

=== Post cranial skeleton ===
In both the anterior and posterior views, the centrum faces are subcircular, somewhat concave, and have slightly flared rims. Each centrum has two concave, ventromedially inclined, rectangular surfaces that are separated by a sharp, deep mid-line keel. The anteroventral corners of the centrum have oval-shaped parapophyses that are oriented posteriorly, and each one begins a pronounced ridge that reaches the centrum's posterior edge. The dorsoventral and mediolateral sides of the centra are concave, forming distinct but shallow lateral fossae that make contact with the neural arch dorsally. At the base of the neural arch, the diapophyses are positioned centrally. The best-preserved vertebra reveals that they are oval in cross-section, bent ventrolaterally, and somewhat elongate. In the back, the neural canal is rounded. The matching centrum face is shorter than the complete neural arch. The zygapophyses are well formed, long, and inclined at a 45-degree angle.

==== Mid trunk vertebra ====
The centra's articular faces are rounded, somewhat concave, and have wide rims that flare outward. The centrum has a ventral surface that is thin and smooth, profoundly concave lateral sides, and is longer (45.78 mm) than it is tall (41.81 mm). The neural canal is broad, and the neural arch's canal-lateral borders are medium-thin and have strong anterior edges in anterior view.

The prezygapophyses are inclined at around 45 degrees from the horizontal. There is a large, sub-triangular spinoprezygapophyseal fossa between the prezygapophyses and ventral to the base of the neural spine that is well-developed. This produces a wide shelf for the posterior section of the neural arch of the previous vertebra when combined with the flat prezygapophyses. Between the ventromedial borders of the prezygapophyses, a horizontal ventral bar covers the neural canal's entrance. The centroprezygapophyseal fossa (cprf), which is ventrolateral to the prezygapophysis, is a deep depression that is posteriorly bounded by the major strut of the transverse process.

The postzygapophyses are likewise situated around 45 degrees above the horizontal in posterior view. On the posterior aspect, they have a triangular shape and a lateral postzygadiapophyseal lamina that is well developed. In dorsal view, that lamina creates a wide dorsal ledge of the transverse process and continues laterally to the diapophysis. Along the transverse process, the shelf is larger proximally and narrower distally. There are two shallow postzygapophyseal spinodiapophyseal fossae located along the shelf's dorsal surface, between the postzygapophyses and the neural spine.

In comparison to the centrum height, the neural spine is short (32.3 mm). The spine is mediolaterally enlarged at the distal end and is anteroposteriorly elongate, measuring the same length as the neural arch's proximal section. Spinoprezygapophyseal and spinopostzygapophyseal laminae are paired vertically along the anterior and posterior edges of the neural spine.

==== Posterior trunk vertebra ====
The neural spines and transverse processes of the mid- and posterior trunk vertebrae of Scutarx deltatylus differ noticeably from each other, and this coincides with the loss of distinct parapophyses and diapophyses along the series. The centra also become dorsoventrally taller than they are anteroposteriorly. Regarding the existence of the different vertebral laminae and related fossae, the properties of the neural spine are the same as those of the mid-trunk vertebrae. Fossil records show that the prezygodiapophyseal laminae of the mid and posterior trunk vertebrae have significantly more pronounced development and lateral extension when compared to neural spines.

==== Sacral vertebra ====
A robust, wide sacral rib that laterally extends anterodorsally to touch the posterodorsal border of the left ilium is a recognizable feature of this element.

==== Rib ====
The anterior and mid-trunk ribs are double-headed. They extend laterally and then sharply turn ventrolaterally and then gradually turn more ventrally. The rib body is oval in cross-section, flattening more distally; it is broadest at the point of the sharp ventrolateral turn. Just lateral to the ventrolateral hook, a thin bone flange that starts on the dorsal side of the tuberculum continues laterally and confluences with the rib body. The posterodorsal surface of the rib is lined by a deep, elongate groove created by the flange. The rib is flattened dorsally and develops a slender anterior blade. The transverse processes of the dorsal vertebrae are fused with the single-headed, posteriormost ribs.

==== Pubis ====
An extended, thin "tube" that bends anteroventrally and widens medially into two broad sheets of bone that meet in a median symphysis makes up the pubis' body. The front and posterior contours of the pubic are convex, rarely extending over the puboischiadic plate's ventral edge dorsoventrally due to its short length. As opposed to the robust, knob-like projections, the distal extremities of the pubes are shaped like elongate commata, which are thin and curve towards the symphysis. A unique character of the pubis of Scutarx deltatylus is the presence of two large pubic foremen, a characteristic seen in only one other aetosaur.

Aetosaur osteoderms

==== Osteoderm ====
The anterior bars of the cervical osteoderms, which are well-developed and have pronounced anteromedial projections, are thick dorsoventrally. The lateral edges are extremely sigmoidal and devoid of anterolateral projections. The ornamentation on the dorsal surface is minimally developed, with few features. The posterior plate edge is touched by the low, wide, and mounded dorsal eminence. Also medially offset and closer to the midline margin is the eminence. The osteoderm's posteromedial corner contains the distinctive triangle protuberance used to identify Scutarx deltatylus. In contrast to the equilateral triangles observed in the trunk series, the form of that protuberance is more like a right triangle in the cervical paramedian osteoderms. The osteoderms are slightly arched when seen from the back. As is characteristic for aetosaurians, the median margins are thick dorsoventrally and sigmoidal in medial view. The "tongue-and-groove" lateral articular surfaces found in other aetosaurias are absent in Scutarx deltatylus.

While comparable and have a wider width/length ratio of 2.05 than their more anterior counterparts, the cervical paramedian osteoderms lack a pronounced sigmoidal lateral border. Even though the margin has a considerable anterolateral projection, it remains sigmoidal. Moreover, the anterolateral curvature of the anterior and posterior plate edges is minor. These osteoderms are dorsoventrally thinner and less arched in posterior view than the osteoderms that are located more anterior. Although there might be an individual difference, the dorsal eminence is significantly offset medially and slightly more developed, becoming elevated and more pyramidal in form.

==== Trunk ====
While it can be challenging to distinguish the osteoderm transition between the cervical and trunk series, anterior dorsal trunk osteoderms are considered to have greater width/length ratios and be dorsoventrally thinner than the cervical paramedian osteoderms. The triangular protuberance is also more equally sized. These osteoderms are difficult to distinguish from those in the anterior caudal area.

The anterior bar is consistently wide over the osteoderm's lateral section, but it dramatically narrows medially before swelling once again at the anteromedial projection, making it profoundly concave. This is known as scalloping. This "scalloping" of the anterior bar is a synapomorphy found in all aetosaurs.

The related lateral osteoderm has a minor overlap with the sigmoidal lateral border in the anterior region, which is just posterior to the anterior bar. The osteoderm is hardly curved in the posterior view. The osteoderm is more sharply arched in those that are thought to be located more posteriorly. There is a little embayment on the underside of the dorsal eminence and a smooth ventral surface to the dorsal trunk paramedian osteoderms.

==== Caudal ====
For Scutarx deltatylus, the trunk-caudal transition exhibits a noticeable height increase from the mid-trunk area to the anterior dorsal caudal region. The dorsal prominence is a large pyramid with a vertical keel at the back. The anterior caudal osteoderms are identical to those in the trunk.

The breadth and length of dorsal mid-caudal paramedians are almost comparable. The prominent dorsal eminence and the anteromedial and anterolateral projections of the anterior bar are still present in those osteoderms.

The dorsal eminence is reduced to a raised, anteroposteriorly elongate keel with a posterior projection that reaches beyond the posterior boundary of the osteoderm, and the posterior dorsal caudal paramedians become longer than broad. They presumably continue until they develop into long strips of bone.

== Diet ==
It was originally believed that aetosaurs were primarily herbivores. Recent aetosaur skull finds, such as those of Neoaetosauroides engaeus and Aetosauroides scagliai, demonstrated that at least some aetosaur species were omnivorous. Scutarx deltatylus, like most aetosaurs however, was a herbivore.
