= Pinacosuchus =

Pinacosuchus Temporal range: Late Cretaceous

Scientific classification
- Kingdom: Animalia
- Phylum: Chordata
- Class: Reptilia
- Superorder: Crocodylomorpha
- Genus: †Pinacosuchus Gilmore, 1942

Species
- †P. mantiensis Gilmore, 1942 (type)

Extinct genus of reptiles

Pinacosuchus is an extinct genus of crocodylomorph. Fossils attributed to the genus have been reported from the Late Cretaceous North Horn Formation of Utah (United States). Pinacosuchus has been described as a small-bodied crocodylomorph with spiky dermal armor, but it is known only from limited remains.

== History and description ==
Charles W. Gilmore named Pinacosuchus in 1942 for USNM 16592, consisting of a fragment of upper jaw, seven partial vertebrae, a partial coracoid, a partial thigh bone, numerous pieces of bony armor, and other fragments. This specimen was discovered at the "Lizard Locality" in the Manti National Forest, Emery County, Utah. The type species is P. mantiensis. Gilmore had difficulty classifying the specimen, due to its fragmentary nature. He ruled out all then-known orders of reptiles on anatomical ground except for Crocodilia (which had a more expansive definition at the time) and the nebulous thecodontia. He considered a pseudosuchian thecodont identity, but eliminated it because all members were of Triassic age or older. Pinacosuchus would have been an archaic crocodilian because it lacked the procoelous vertebrae (concave articulation surface on the anterior face of the bone, and convex articulation on the posterior face) of more derived crocodilians, instead having amphicoelous vertebrae (concave articulations on both faces).

Pinacosuchus would have been a very small crocodylomorph. The sacrum (the vertebra supporting the hips) of USNM 16592 was only 14.3 millimetres (0.56 in) long. Gilmore regarded the specimen as an adult because the vertebrae lacked sutures for their neural arches, a sign of maturity. This assessment was supported by O'Neill and colleagues, comparing Pinacosuchus to their new spiked crocodilian Akanthosuchus. The armor of Pinacosuchus was found disarticulated. Gilmore divided the armor into five categories: simple rectangular scutes; ridged rooflike scutes; thickened rectangular scutes with asymmetrically-positioned sharp spines overhanging the borders; small pointed spines with thickened bases; and more elongate pointed spines with thickened bases. The genus is briefly mentioned in Cifelli et al. (1999) under the misspelling "Pinasuchus". In the text of this publication, it is mentioned that Kenneth Carpenter had observed "some faint resemblances" to the Morrison Formation goniopholidid genus Eutretauranosuchus. It is incorrectly listed as a possible ankylosaur in Table 1.
