= Marmarosaurus =

Marmarosaurus Temporal range: Middle Jurassic (Bathonian)

Scientific classification
- Kingdom: Animalia
- Phylum: Chordata
- Class: Reptilia
- Clade: Archosauria
- Clade: Pseudosuchia
- Clade: Crocodylomorpha
- Suborder: †Thalattosuchia
- Family: †Teleosauridae
- Genus: †Marmarosaurus; Owen, 1840–1845

Species
- Marmarosaurus obtusus Owen, 1840–1845 (type)

Extinct genus of reptiles

Marmoarsaurus is an extinct genus of teleosaurid thalattosuchian. The genus and type species, M. obtusus, were named by Richard Owen in his 1840–1845 volume Odontography, the genus in the text, the species in a caption. Owen provided little information on the taxon beyond that it was based on a tooth from the Forest Marble. Woodward (1885) later noted that the tooth was from Wiltshire and had come from the collection of Dr. Channing Pearce, and commented "Genus and species imperfectly characterized, and apparently ignored in all later works."
