= Heterodontosuchus =

Heterodontosuchus Temporal range: Late Triassic

Scientific classification
- Kingdom: Animalia
- Phylum: Chordata
- Class: Sauropsida
- Order: Phytosauria
- Family: Phytosauridae
- Subfamily: Pseudopalatinae
- Genus: Heterodontosuchus Lucas, 1898

Species
- H. ganei Lucas, 1898 (type)

Extinct genus of reptiles

Heterodontosuchus is a dubious genus of extinct phytosaur. The genus was first described from a fragmentary anterior section of the mandible found from the Henry Mountains in southeastern Utah, USA. More fossils were later found from Arizona. The name Heterodontosuchus refers to the difference in size between anterior and posterior teeth on this mandible. The teeth were compressed antero-posteriorly spaced closely together. The genus is now thought to be synonymous with Nicrosaurus, and the type and only species, H. ganei, is regarded as a nomen dubium due to the fragmentary nature of the remains associated with it.
