= Manracosuchus =

Scientific classification
- Domain: Eukaryota
- Kingdom: Animalia
- Phylum: Chordata
- Class: Reptilia
- Clade: Archosauria
- Clade: Pseudosuchia
- Clade: Crocodylomorpha
- Clade: Crocodyliformes
- Order: Crocodilia (?)
- Genus: †Manracosuchus; Efimov, 1984

Species
- †M. isolatus Efimov, 1984 (type)

Extinct genus of reptiles

Manracosuchus is an extinct genus of dubious crocodylian known from the Early-Middle Eocene Obaylin Formation of Kazakhstan.

== Taxonomy ==
The type species of Manracosuchus, M. isolatus, is known from a fragment of the lower jaw, isolated teeth, scute fragments, and a post-symphysial part of a right dentary. It was subsequently referred to Allognathosuchus by Efimov (1986), but was later restored to its original binomial by Efimov (1993). A 2015 overview of extinct crocodyliforms from the former Soviet Union and adjacent countries treated Manracosuchus as a nomen dubium referable to Crocodylia incertae sedis.
