= Ebrachosaurus =

Ebrachosaurus Temporal range: Late Triassic

Scientific classification
- Kingdom: Animalia
- Phylum: Chordata
- Class: Reptilia
- Clade: Pseudosuchia
- Order: †Aetosauria
- Family: †Stagonolepididae
- Genus: †Ebrachosaurus; Kuhn, 1936

Type species
- E. singularis Kuhn, 1936

Extinct genus of reptiles

Ebrachosaurus is an extinct genus of aetosaur. It was named after the town of Ebrach, Germany, near an outcrop of the Blasensandstein Formation where the original fossils have been found. Other Blasensandstein fauna include the temnospondyl Metoposaurus and the phytosaur Francosuchus. The genus has often been considered synonymous with the closely related Stagonolepis. The holotype specimen was lost during World War II, so its relationships within Stagonolepididae remain indeterminant.
