= Leptorrhamphus =

Leptorrhamphus Temporal range: Mid-Late Miocene ~11.6–7.2 Ma

Scientific classification
- Kingdom: Animalia
- Phylum: Chordata
- Class: Reptilia
- Clade: Archosauria
- Order: Crocodilia
- Superfamily: Gavialoidea
- Genus: †Leptorrhamphus; Ambrosetti, 1890

Type species
- Leptorrhamphus entrerrianus Ambrosetti, 1890

Extinct genus of reptiles

Leptorrhamphus is an extinct monospecific genus of gavialoid crocodilian that lived during the Middle to Late Miocene in what is now Argentina. Fossils have been found in the formation then named Entrerriana Formation, in modern literature referred to as the Ituzaingó Formation. The type species is L. entrerrianus, named after the formation in 1890. It is now thought to be a nomen dubium.
