= Baharijodon =

Baharijodon Temporal range: Late Cretaceous

Scientific classification
- Domain: Eukaryota
- Kingdom: Animalia
- Phylum: Chordata
- Class: Reptilia
- Clade: Archosauria
- Clade: Pseudosuchia
- Clade: Crocodylomorpha
- Clade: Crocodyliformes
- Family: †Trematochampsidae
- Genus: †Baharijodon; Kuhn, 1936

Type species
- B. carnosauroides Kuhn, 1936

Extinct genus of reptiles

Baharijodon is an extinct genus of trematochampsid crocodylomorph. It is known from the Bahariya Formation in Egypt, which dates back to the Cenomanian stage of the Late Cretaceous. The genus is known from a single tooth, which was first figured by Ernst Stromer in 1933, and then named as a new genus of the family Goniopholididae by Oskar Kuhn in 1936. In 1979, Éric Buffetaut and P. Taquet instead referred the tooth to Trematochampsidae.
