= Sajkanosuchus =

Sajkanosuchus Temporal range: Middle Eocene, 47.8–38.0 Ma

Scientific classification
- Domain: Eukaryota
- Kingdom: Animalia
- Phylum: Chordata
- Class: Reptilia
- Clade: Archosauromorpha
- Clade: Archosauriformes
- Order: Crocodilia
- Family: Alligatoridae
- Genus: †Sajkanosuchus; Efimov, 1984

Type species
- †Sajkanosuchus ckhikvadzoi Efimov, 1984

Extinct genus of reptiles

Sajkanosuchus is an extinct monospecific genus of alligatorid crocodilian. It is known from the middle Eocene of eastern Kazakhstan. Fossils have been found from the Zaysan Basin in clays that are referred to as the Obayla suite. The type species is Sajkanosuchus ckhikvadzoi, named in 1984.
