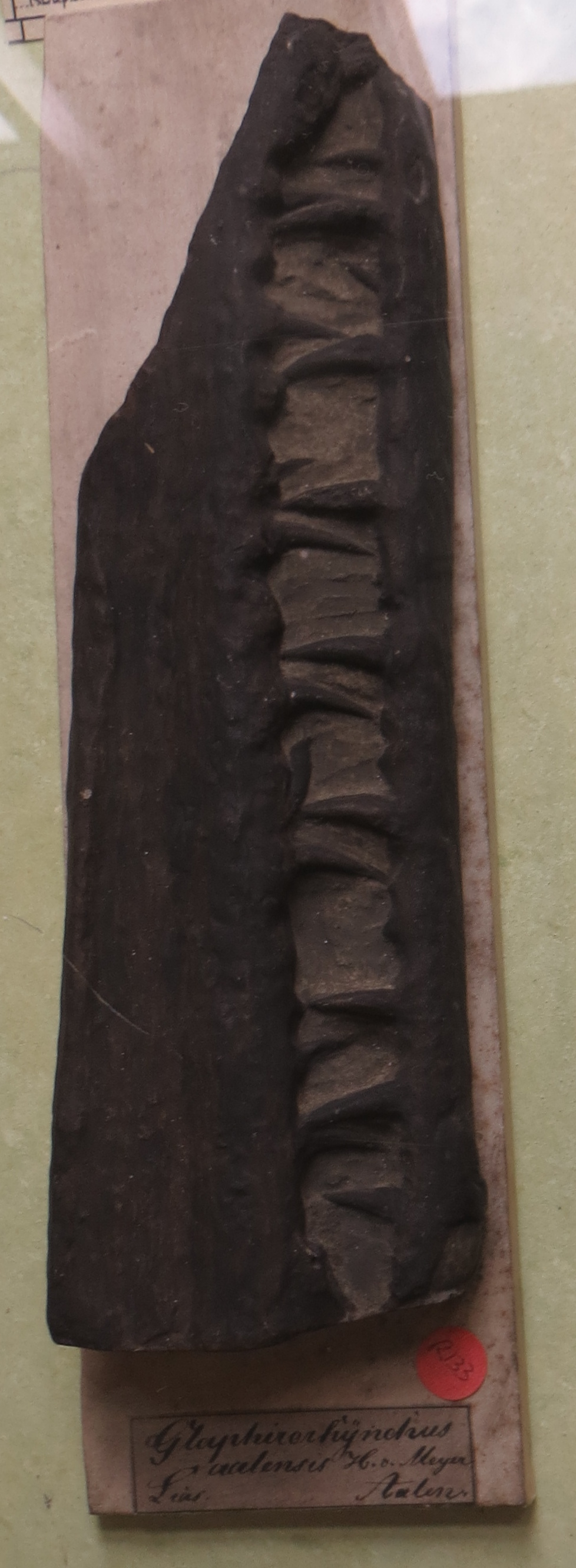
- Cast of the jaws, Natural History Museum, Bonn University

Scientific classification
- Kingdom: Animalia
- Phylum: Chordata
- Class: Reptilia
- Clade: Archosauria
- Clade: Pseudosuchia
- Clade: Crocodylomorpha
- Suborder: †Thalattosuchia
- Family: †Teleosauridae
- Genus: †Glaphyrorhynchus von Meyer, 1842

Species
- G. aalensis von Meyer, 1842 (type)

= Glaphyrorhynchus =

Glaphyrorhynchus Temporal range: Middle Jurassic

Extinct genus of reptiles

Glaphyrorhynchus is an extinct genus of teleosaurid thalattosuchian from the Middle Jurassic (Aalenian) of southern Germany.

== Taxonomy and provenance ==
Glaphyrorhynchus is known only from a jaw fragment found in the late Aalenian of Aalen, Germany. The holotype is lost, so the validity of the taxon remains unclear.
