= Oxysdonsaurus =

Oxysdonsaurus Temporal range: Oligocene

Scientific classification
- Domain: Eukaryota
- Kingdom: Animalia
- Phylum: Chordata
- Class: Reptilia
- Clade: Archosauromorpha
- Clade: Archosauriformes
- Order: Crocodilia
- Family: Crocodylidae
- Genus: †Oxysdonsaurus; Ambrosetti, 1890

Species
- O. striatus Ambrosetti, 1890 (type)

Extinct genus of reptiles

Oxysdonsaurus is an extinct genus of crocodylid crocodilian. Fossils have been found from the Paraná Basin in Argentina that date back to the Oligocene. According to Edward Drinker Cope, the generic name is a misspelling of the intended name Oxyodontosaurus. The genus is known only from a single tooth and is thus considered indeterminate.
