= Brasilosuchus =

Brasilosuchus Temporal range: Miocene, 9 Ma

Scientific classification
- Domain: Eukaryota
- Kingdom: Animalia
- Phylum: Chordata
- Class: Reptilia
- Clade: Archosauromorpha
- Clade: Archosauriformes
- Order: Crocodilia
- Family: Gavialidae
- Genus: †Brasilosuchus; Souza-Filho & Bocquentin-Villanueva, 1989
- Species: †B. mendesi

Binomial name
- †Brasilosuchus mendesi Souza-Filho & Bocquentin-Villanueva, 1989

Extinct genus of reptiles

Brasilosuchus is an extinct monospecific genus of crocodilian that lived during the Miocene of Brazil. It contains one species, Brasilosuchus mendesi, named by Jonas Souza-Filho and Jean Bocquentin-Villanueva in 1989. They subsequently re-identified it as a species of Charactosuchus in a 1993 conference abstract, but this conclusion has not been accepted since it was not published. Along with Charactosuchus, it is possibly a member of Tomistominae, but they have not been included in a phylogenetic analysis. If this interpretation is correct, then they would have originated from North American ancestors in the first dispersal of the group into the Americas.
