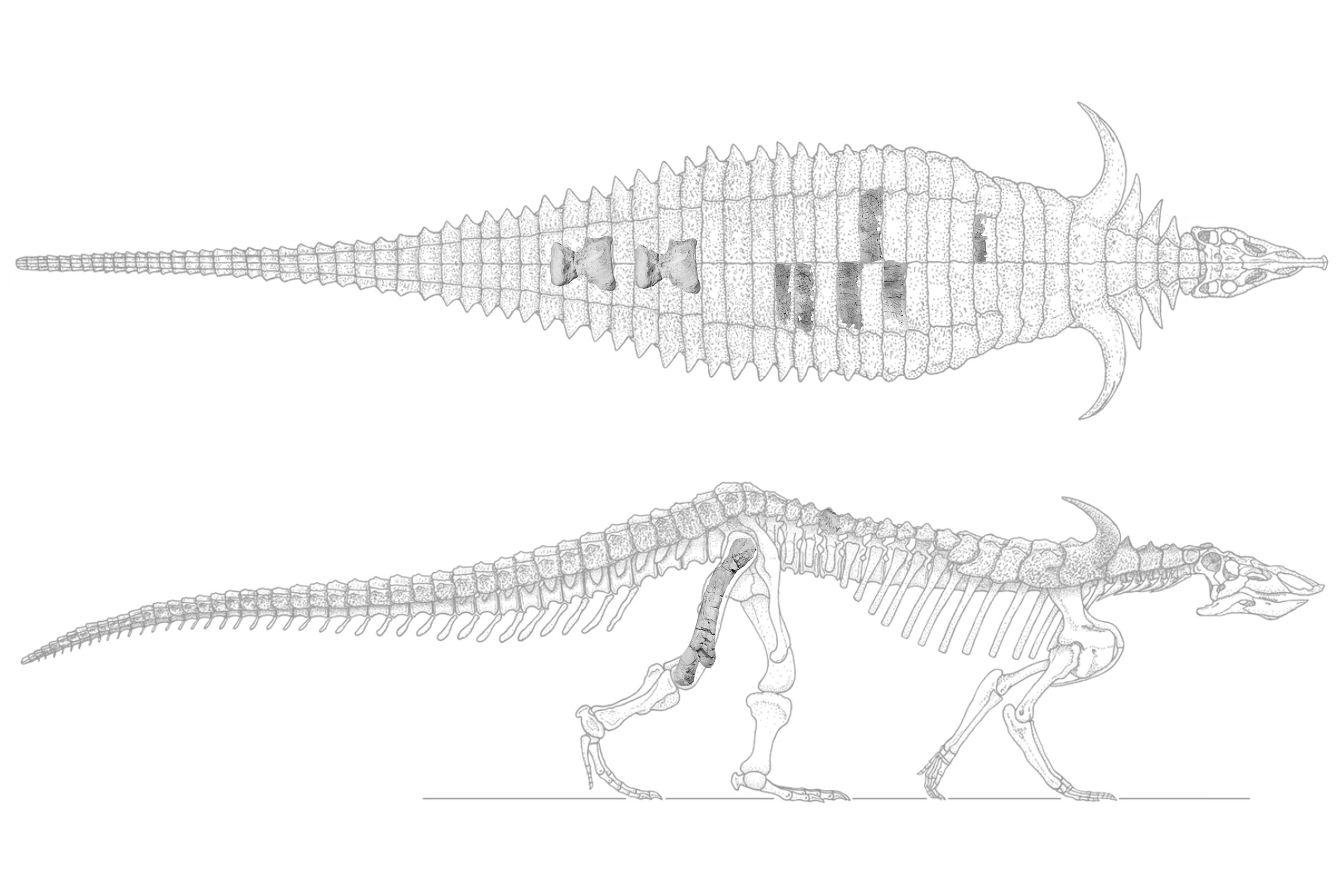
- A reconstruction of Adamanasuchus created by superimposing described fossils over Desmatosuchus which is a close relative

Scientific classification
- Kingdom: Animalia
- Phylum: Chordata
- Class: Reptilia
- Clade: Pseudosuchia
- Order: †Aetosauria
- Family: †Stagonolepididae
- Genus: †Adamanasuchus; Lucas, Hunt & Spielmann, 2007

Type species
- †Adamanasuchus eisenhardtae Lucas, Hunt & Spielmann, 2007

= Adamanasuchus =

Adamanasuchus Temporal range: Late Triassic, 222–216.5 Ma

Extinct genus of reptiles

Adamanasuchus is an extinct genus of aetosaur that lived during the Late Triassic period around 222-216.5 million years ago. Fossils have been found from several localities from the Chinle Group in Arizona and date back to the late Carnian stage of the Late Triassic. The locality from which it was named after also lends its name to the Adamanian LVF (land vertebrate faunachron).

== Description ==
It was a relatively large genus of aetosaur with unique armor plating. The dorsal armor of Adamanasuchus are distinctive and represent a mosaic of features only found on few aetosaur genera showing that the evolution of aetosaur armor was complex.

This genus is known from partial fossil material of the dorsal armor, caudal vertebrae and a femur. It can be distinguished from other aetosaur genera by several characteristics. The paramedian osteoderms are narrow (~200-225 mm) and arched at a ~30º angle with sparse pitting and faint ridges that are distributed in a limited radial pattern, raised anterior bars, ventral keels, and a ridge or eminence that meets with the posterior edge of the osteoderm, and lateral osteoderms with low, pyramidal spikes that are sparsely distributed pits, faint ridges and relatively shallow arching.

== Paleobiology ==
Adamanasuchus lived in what is now Arizona during the Late Triassic period in the Chinle Formation. It lived at the same time of many different genera of aetosaurs such as Longosuchus, Coahomasuchus, Stagonolepis, Desmatosuchus, Tecovasuchus, Paratypothorax, Typothorax, Rioarribasuchus, Aetosaurus, and Redondasuchus.
