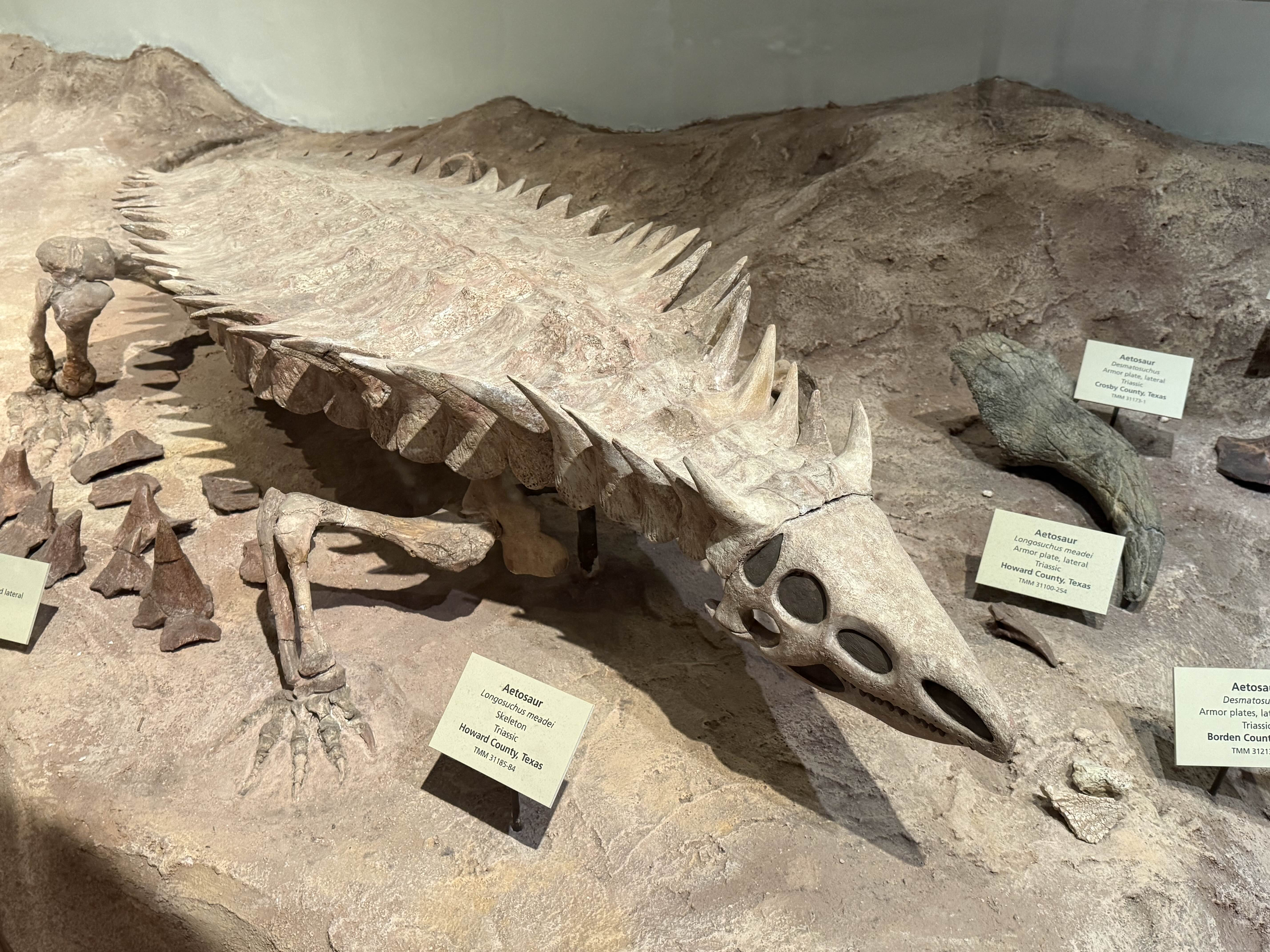
- Mounted skeleton

Scientific classification
- Kingdom: Animalia
- Phylum: Chordata
- Class: Reptilia
- Clade: Pseudosuchia
- Order: †Aetosauria
- Family: †Stagonolepididae
- Subfamily: †Desmatosuchinae
- Genus: †Longosuchus; Hunt & Lucas, 1990

Species
- †L. meadei (Sawin, 1947) (type)

= Longosuchus =

Longosuchus Temporal range: Late Triassic

Extinct genus of reptiles

Longosuchus (meaning "Long's crocodile") is an extinct genus of desmatosuchin aetosaur from the Late Triassic of North America. Reported fossils from Morocco are likely misidentified scutes of a paratypothoracin aetosaur. Longosuchus measured about 3 metres in length.

== Taxonomy ==
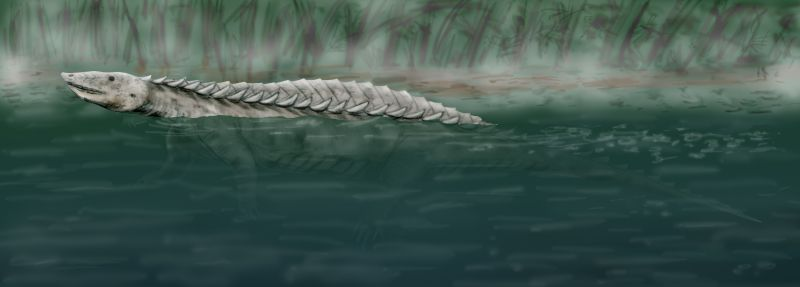
Restoration

Longosuchus was originally named as a species of Typothorax, T. meadei, in 1947 on the basis of skeletal remains from the Otis Chalk quarries in Howard County, western Texas. Hunt and Lucas (1990) recognized T. meadei as generically distinct from the type species of Typothorax and renamed it Longosuchus in honor of Robert Long.
