= Paleontology in North Carolina =

Paleontological research in the U.S. state of North Carolina

The location of the state of North Carolina

Paleontology in North Carolina refers to paleontological research occurring within or conducted by people from the U.S. state of North Carolina. Fossils are common in North Carolina. According to author Rufus Johnson, "almost every major river and creek east of Interstate 95 has exposures where fossils can be found". The fossil record of North Carolina spans from Eocambrian remains that are 600 million years old, to the Pleistocene 10,000 years ago.

About 600 million years ago, North Carolina was covered by a warm shallow sea that was home to corals, jellyfish, and Pteridinium. This sea remained in place during the early part of the Paleozoic era and was inhabited by a variety of marine life forms, like those that left the trace fossil Skolithos. The later part of the Paleozoic is missing from the local rock record. By the Triassic, North Carolina had a terrestrial environment where the local bodies of freshwater were inhabited by invertebrates and fishes while conifers and cycads grew on land. Dinosaurs and other kinds of prehistoric reptiles lived in the area. The Jurassic is missing from the local rock record except deep in the subsurface, but during the Cretaceous evidence points to a shallow sea intermittently covering the eastern part of the state, which was home to creatures like belemnites, and occasionally dinosaur carcasses which had washed out to sea were preserved.

Sea levels continued to rise and fall after the Cretaceous, and occasionally marine invertebrates, bony fishes, sharks, and whales were preserved. Cenozoic limestone is common in North Carolina and rich in fossils. The gravel and marl pits of North Carolina are also known for their abundant fossils. Later Cenozoic marine life included the giant shark megalodon. During the later part of the Pleistocene epoch, the sea withdrew from the state, which was then inhabited by mammoths and mastodons.

Early significant discoveries in the state include Cretaceous reptile fossils discovered in the 1850s by state geologist Ebenezar Emmons. During the Civil War, Confederate coal miners uncovered many Triassic fossils. In approximately 1869, the state's first known dinosaur fossils were discovered.

== Prehistory ==
The fossil record of North Carolina spans from Eocambrian remains 600 million years old to the Pleistocene 10,000 years ago.

=== Eocambrian ===
During the Eocambrian, North Carolina was covered in seawater. More than 600 million years ago Ediacaran animals left behind remains in Stanly County. These are the oldest known lifeforms in the state and among the oldest large fossils in the world. Stromatolites are relatively common in the state when compared to other Precambrian fossils. A few Ediacarian biota have been found in the state. A pair of Pteridinium were found in a creek in Stanly County (this fossil is now on display in the NC Museum of Natural Sciences). The disk-shaped Aspidella is also known from the state, as well as the strange Sekwia.

=== Cambrian ===
North Carolina remained covered by a shallow sea through the early part of the Paleozoic. The remainder of the Paleozoic was a time of significant geologic upheaval in the state. There are no sedimentary rocks from this interval of time in which fossils could have been preserved.

North Carolina has very few Cambrian fossils. The only known fossils from this time period is the tube-shaped trace fossil Skolithos. However, a few trilobites are known from Cambrian deposits in South Carolina, which are the same age as North Carolina's Cambrian deposits; thus it is likely that trilobites lived in North Carolina as well.

=== Triassic ===
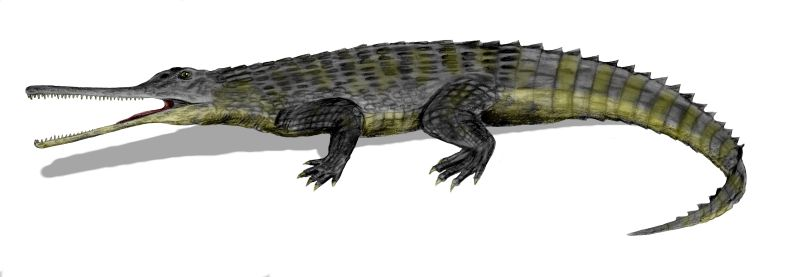
Restoration of R. caronlinensis.

Powerful geologic forces formed rifts in North Carolina during the Triassic period. Clams, crustaceans, and fishes lived in local lakes and rivers. On land, the local flora included conifers and cycads. The early Mesozoic plant life of North Carolina was very similar to that of neighboring Virginia. North Carolinan Mesozoic plant life left behind abundant remains of cycads and conifers. At least 9 kinds of Mesozoic plants are endemic to North Carolina. By about 210 million years ago the sediments of the Pekin Formation were being deposited in North Carolina. Ferns and horsetails that grew in what is now Chatham County have been the source of exquisitely preserved fossils. Otozamites also grew in Chatham County. Other kinds of fossils preserved in the Triassic Pekin deposits include amphibians, fish scales, and petrified wood. The formation also preserves several kinds of Late Triassic reptiles. Pekin Formation reptiles include Pekinosaurus olseni, early relatives of modern crocodiles like the phytosaur Rutiodon, and several species of aetosaur. One interesting Triassic find in North Carolina was Uatchitodon, an archosauromorph reptile with hollow teeth adapted for the delivery of venom. The fossil footprint ichnogenera Apatopus and Brachychirotherium have been identified here and were likely left by archosaurs.

The Solite Quarry, is which straddles the border between Virginia and North Carolina is another source of Late Triassic fossils. The vertebrate fauna it preserved included crocodilians, phytosaurs, and lizard-like animals. These left behind fragmentary skeletal remains like teeth and a few bones, as well as trace fossils like footprints. Dinosaur footprints were also laid down here during the Triassic. Despite the vertebrate fossils, the Solite Quarry is most famous for its fossil insects. This is the only place on earth where complete well-preserved Triassic insects are known from. The oldest known examples of many living groups have been preserved here. Insects of the Solite Quarry include staphylinid beetles, caddis-flies, belostomatids, and thrips. Fossil insects are common at other places in Virginia and North Carolina as well. Small specimens were often preserved in association with unusually rich concentrations of conchostracans.

=== Jurassic ===
There are no known Jurassic rocks at the surface of North Carolina. However, there is a large expanse of possible late Jurassic rock lying 8,500 to 9,878 feet under present-day Cape Hatteras. However, due to this high depth, it would be extremely difficult to collect fossils from there, and currently the only known fossils from this strata are ostracods collected from deep well cores.

=== Cretaceous ===
For intervals of time during the Cretaceous the state was once more submerged under seawater. Local oysters left behind remains that would later fossilize. Areas of the state not submerged by the sea were home to dinosaurs. About 75 million years ago, during the Cretaceous, the Black Creek Formation (more properly called the Donoho Creek Formation) was being laid down in southern North Carolina. The area was most likely an estuarine environment, judging from fossils found there. Dinosaurs were part of the state's fauna at the time. In fact, this unit is the primary source of the state's dinosaur fossils. Dinosaurs found in the state include the ornithomimid Coelosaurus antiquus, the hadrosaurids Hypsibema crassicauda and (possibly) Hadrosaurus, an indeterminate tyrannosauroid (possibly Dryptosaurus), and an unidentified leptoceratopsid (the first ceratopsian known from the East Coast).

Members of North Carolina's Cretaceous flora have also been preserved as fossils. Some of the local Cretaceous trees were preserved as petrified wood. One petrified log from the Cretaceous period preserved in a small Cumberland County creek weighs hundreds to thousands of pounds. The log is still partially concealed by rock but several feet of the two diameter log juts out across the creek. Mollusks were abundant in Cretaceous North Carolina. Cretaceous mollusks are known in a variety of locations across the state. The Late Cretaceous Peedee beds are known for their belemnites and other mollusks.

=== Paleogene ===
Sea levels also rose and fell during the ensuing Paleogene period of the Cenozoic era. Inhabitants of the sea would sometimes fossilize in the state.

==== Paleocene ====
During the Paleocene epoch, the seas receded, and thus there are very little fossils known from this time. There are two Paleocene formations from North Carolina: the Beaufort Formation and the Bald Head Shoals Formation. The Beaufort Formation is exposed in a few areas around the coastal plain, though it usually is combined with the Eocene Castle Hayne formation. Mosley Creek near Grifton, NC is a good area to find Paleocene fossils in the state. Brachiopods and bivalves are common in this formation. Eutrephoceras sloani has also been reported from Mosley Creek. The large cretoxyrhinid shark Palaeocarcharodon orientalis is also known from the state, based on extremely rare teeth from the Beaufort Formation.

The Bald Head Shoals Formation, on the other hand, has an even more limited exposure; it is only located around the mouth of the Cape Fear River, and its only exposures are on some of the islands created from the dredging of the river. Mollusks and foraminifera are known from here; in fact a new species of turriteline gastropod was discovered in this formation during 2008, found in cores drilled offshore by the U.S. Army Corps of Engineers.

==== Eocene ====
During the Eocene, between 38 and 54 million years ago, North Carolina was home to marine life. Some of their remains are preserved in what are now the marl pits in Pender County. Among the invertebrates were nautiloids, sand dollars, and sea urchins. The vertebrates included bony fish, sharks, and whales. These deposits are relatively well known. Sharks found in the state include early tiger and mako sharks.

Despite their renown, North Carolina's Eocene fossils are generally poorly preserved. Other invertebrates of this epoch included at least two species of gastropod, eleven pelecypods, two brachiopods, four echinoderms, and a great diversity of bryozoans. Remains from this fauna can be found in Pitt, Craven, Lenoir, Wayne, Jones, Onslow, Duplin, and New Hanover counties.

=== Neogene ===
Author Rufus Johnson has described one Neogene marl pit near Aurora in Beaufort County as the most famous fossil site in the entire state. This single fossils site preserves a Neogene fauna that included coral, sand dollars, sea shells, sea urchins, fish remains, seals, sharks with huge teeth, and fossils from whales.

==== Miocene ====
During the later Miocene epoch, Craven County was home to at least 21 different species of pelecypods and 20 species of gastropods. Yet more Miocene deposits provide evidence for a fauna including 35 species of gastropods, 47 pelecypods in southern North Carolina and even down into neighboring South Carolina. Tooth fossils indicate the presence of sharks in the region.

==== Pliocene ====
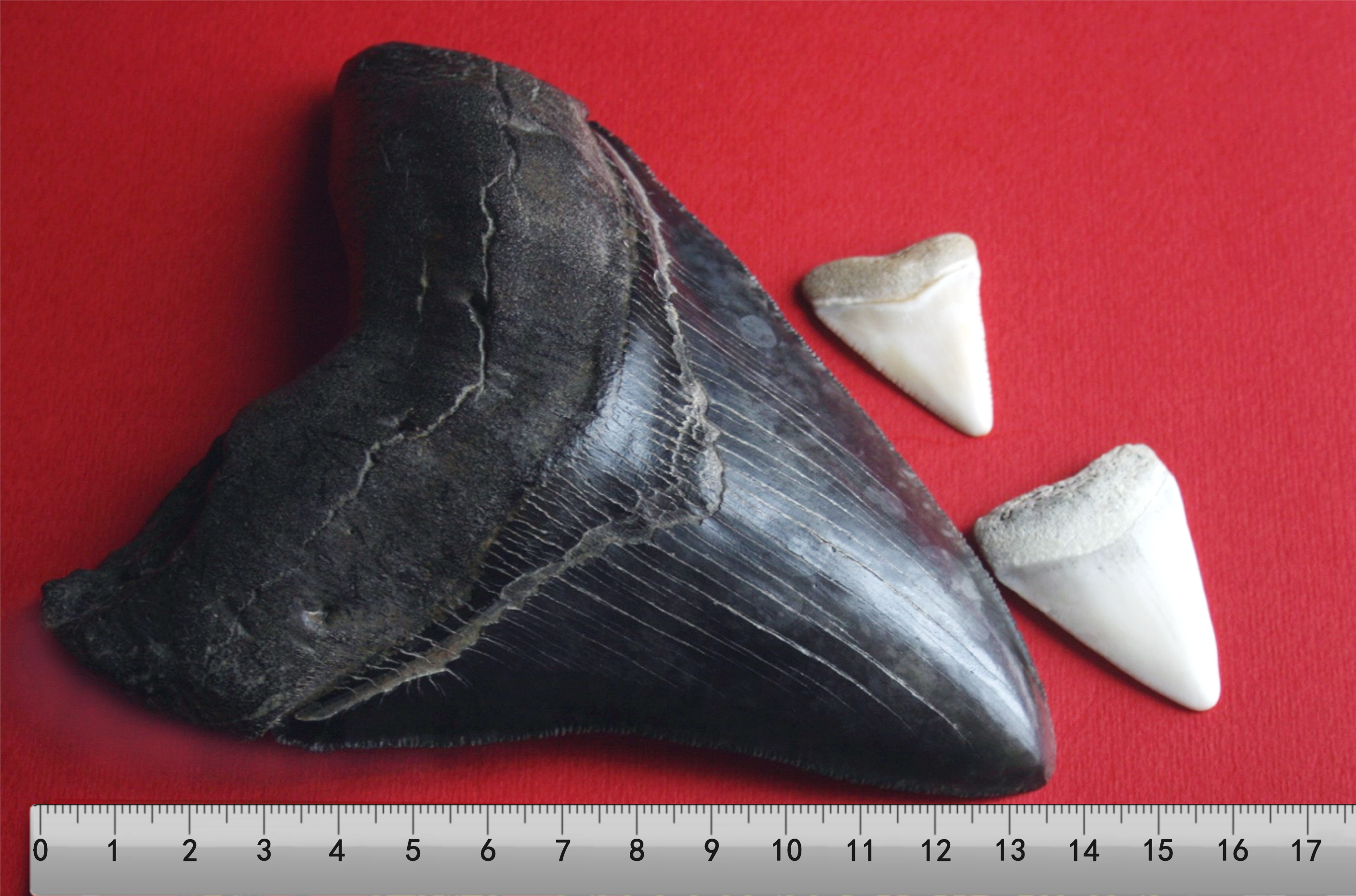
A megalodon tooth with two great white shark teeth. Megalodon is the state fossil of North Carolina.

During the ensuing Pliocene epoch, North Carolina was home to invertebrate faunas. The Yorktown Formation preserves a fauna including well over 43 different kinds of pelecypods, three scaphopods, and one crustacean. Evidence for this fauna is preserved in Halifax, Hertford, Martin, Beaufort, Bertie, Edgecombe, Pitt, and Craven counties. Fossil vertebrates from this fauna included whales and sharks. Pliocene fossil scallops are known from the Yorktown Formation of Northampton and Hertford counties. In Columbus and Onslow counties Pliocene fossils are only known south of the Neuse River. Vertebrates included horses like Equus complicatus. The presence of whales in Halifax County is attested to by a middle ear bone preserved in Pliocene deposits of the Yorktown Formation. Near the transition to the Pleistocene, North Carolina was home to vertebrates like buffalo, megalodon, and whales that were preserved in Halifax County.

=== Quaternary ===
==== Pleistocene ====
During the ensuing Quaternary period sea levels again began to fluctuate in time with the expansion or melting of glaciers to the north. Marine life was common in North Carolina during the Early Pleistocene. Later in the same epoch a fauna including a crustacean, 33 pelecypods, and 24 gastropods left behind remains in Perquimans, Camden, Hyde, Pamlico, Craven, Carteret, Onslow, New Hanover, and Brunswick counties.

Pleistocene vertebrate life in North Carolina included the modern horse genus Equus in Halifax, Pitt, Washington, Pamlico and New Hanover counties. Other kinds of horses left remains in Jones County. Cetacean fossils have been found in Halifax, Carteret, Craven, and Pamlico counties. Mammoth bones have been found in Carteret, Pamlico, and New Hanover Counties. Mastodons from Carteret, Edgecombe, Nash, Craven, Jones, Pamlico, Onslow, Duplin, Wayne, Pender, New Hanover, and Brunswick Counties. Pleistocene mastodon ivory was also preserved in Roanoke Rapids. Tapirs in Craven County. Manatees in Jones County. Megalodon in Pamlico County. The walrus Odobenus rosmarus was preserved in Dare County.

== History ==
Ebenezer Emmons began his tenure as the state geologist in 1851 At some point before the 1863 end of his tenure he would discover the fossilized remains of Late Cretaceous reptiles. Later, during the American Civil War, Confederate miners looking for coal to help power their war efforts uncovered many fossils from the 210-million-year-old Late Triassic Pekin Formation. Around 1869 North Carolina's first known dinosaur fossils were discovered by Washington Caruthers Kerr in a Sampson County marl pit belonging to James King. Later during that same year, Edward Drinker Cope described the dinosaur remains excavated from a Sampson County marl pit as Hypsibema crassicauda.

== Natural history museums ==
- Aurora Fossil Museum, Aurora
- Cape Fear Museum of History and Science, Wilmington
- Asheville Museum of Science, Asheville
- McKinney Geology Teaching Museum, Boone
- Museum of North Carolina Minerals, Spruce Pine
- North Carolina Museum of Life and Science, Durham
- North Carolina Museum of Natural Sciences, Raleigh
- Onslow County Museum, Richlands
- Rankin Museum of American Heritage, Ellerbe
- Schiele Museum of Natural History, Gastonia
- Appalachian Fossil Museum, Blowing Rock

== Notable clubs and associations ==
- North Carolina Fossil Club, Inc.

== See also ==
- Paleontology in South Carolina
- Paleontology in Tennessee
- Paleontology in Virginia
