= Sivalik Hills =

Mountain range in India, Pakistan and Nepal

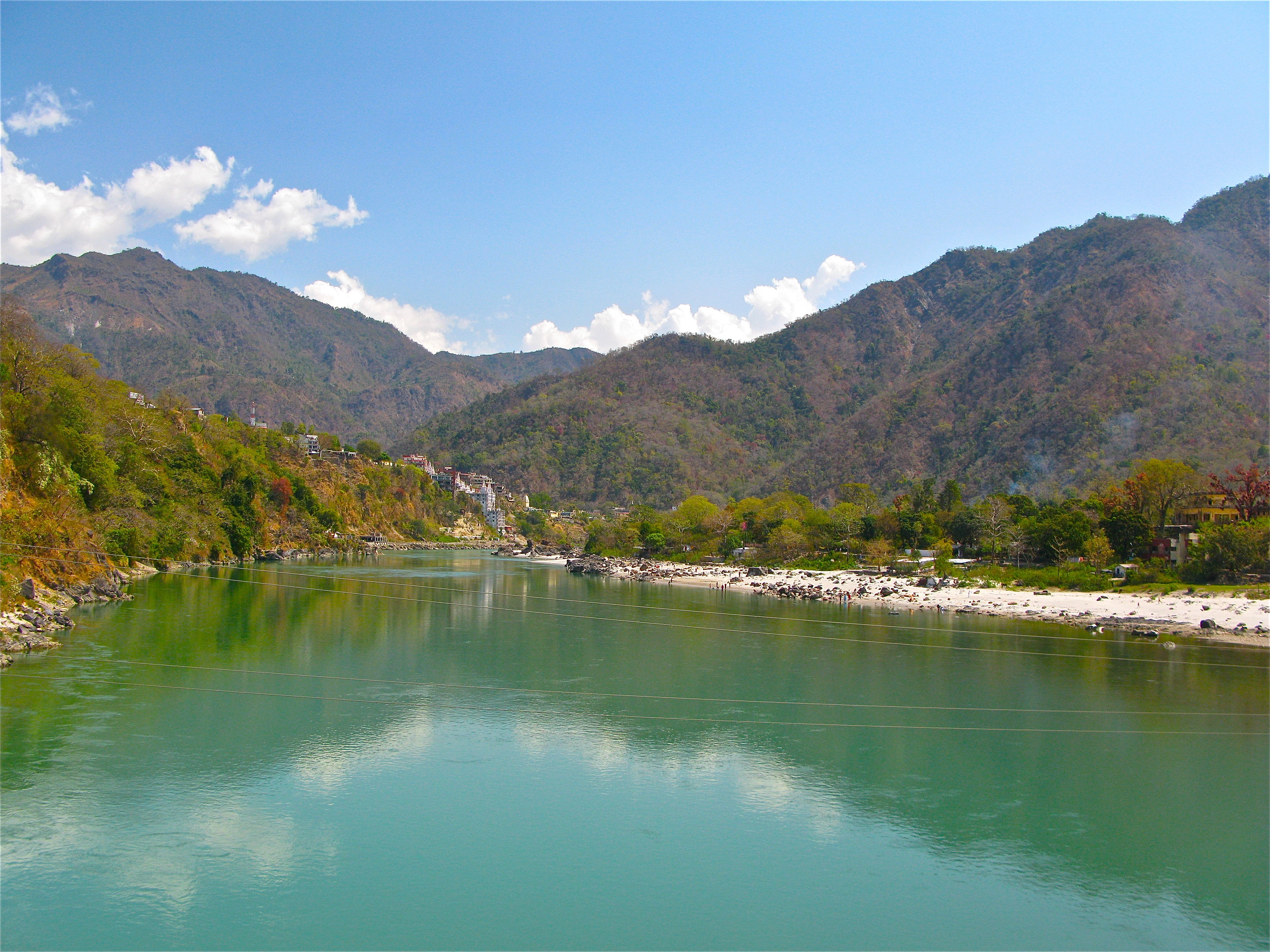
- Sivalik Hills and Ganges River

Dimensions
- Length: 2,400 km (1,500 mi)

Geography
- Sivalik Hills, highlighted in light red
- Location: northern Indian subcontinent
- Range coordinates: 27°46′N 82°24′E
- Parent range: outer Himalayas

Geology
- Rock type: Tertiary

The Sivalik Hills, also known as Churia Hills, are a mountain range of the outer Himalayas. The literal translation of "Sivalik" is 'tresses of Shiva'. The hills are known for their numerous fossils, and are also home to the Soanian Middle Paleolithic archaeological culture.

== Geography ==
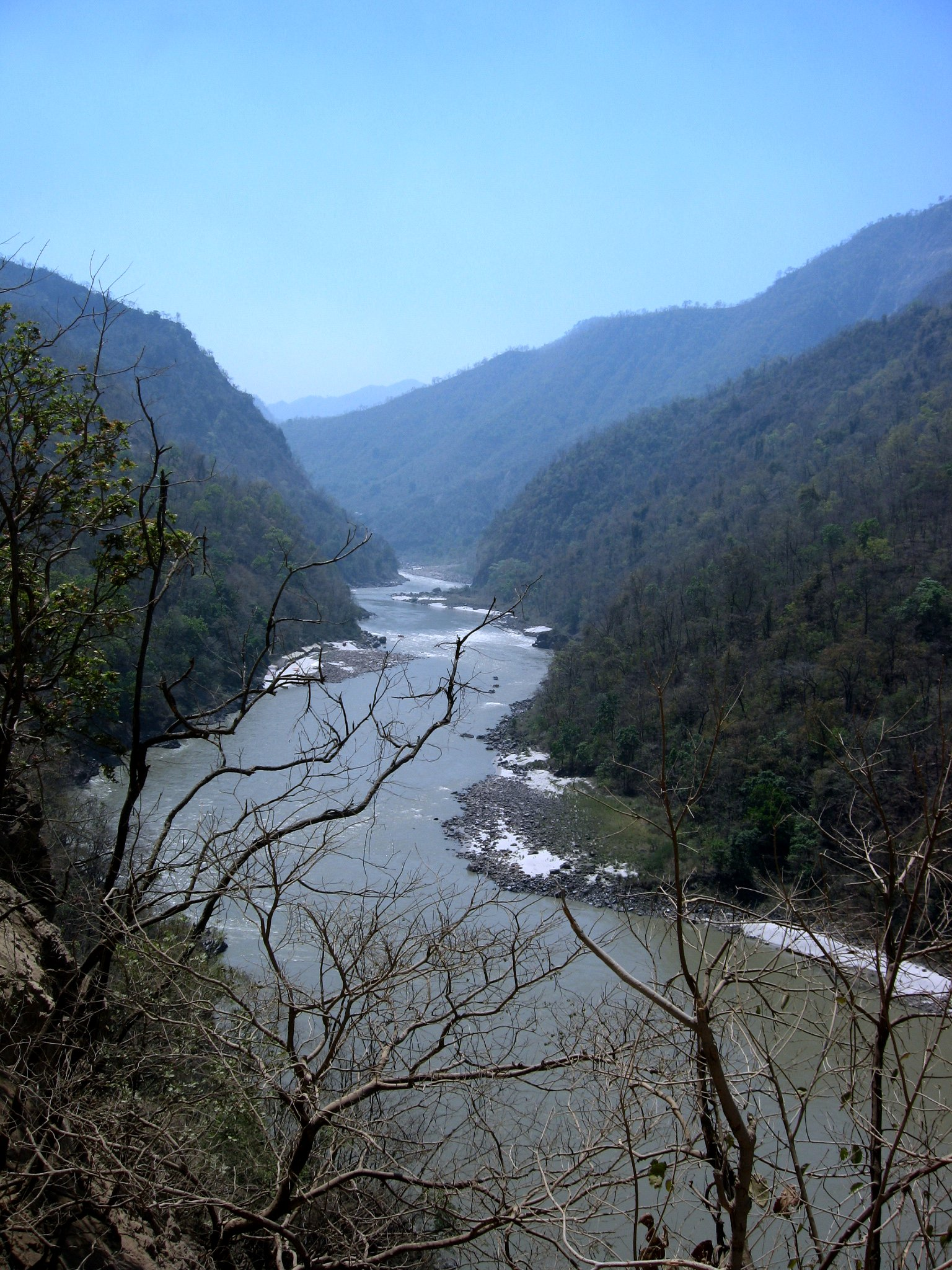
A tributary of the Ganges runs through the Sivalik Hills

The Sivalik Hills are a mountain range of the outer Himalayas that stretches over about 2,400 km (1,500 mi) from the Indus River eastwards close to the Brahmaputra River; they are 10–50 km (6.2–31.1 mi) wide with an average elevation of 1,500–2,000 m (4,900–6,600 ft). Between the Teesta and Raidāk Rivers is a gap of about 90 km (56 mi).

== Geology ==
Geologically, the Sivalik Hills belong to the Tertiary deposits of the outer Himalayas. They are chiefly composed of sandstone and conglomerate rock formations, which are the solidified detritus of the Himalayas to their north; they are poorly consolidated. The sedimentary rocks comprising the hills are believed to be 16–5.2 million years old.

They are bounded on the south by a fault system called the Main Frontal Thrust, with steeper slopes on that side. Below this, the coarse alluvial Bhabar zone makes the transition to the nearly level plains. Rainfall, especially during the summer monsoon, percolates into the Bhabar, then is forced to the surface by finer alluvial layers below it in a zone of springs and marshes along the northern edge of the Terai or plains.

== Prehistory ==
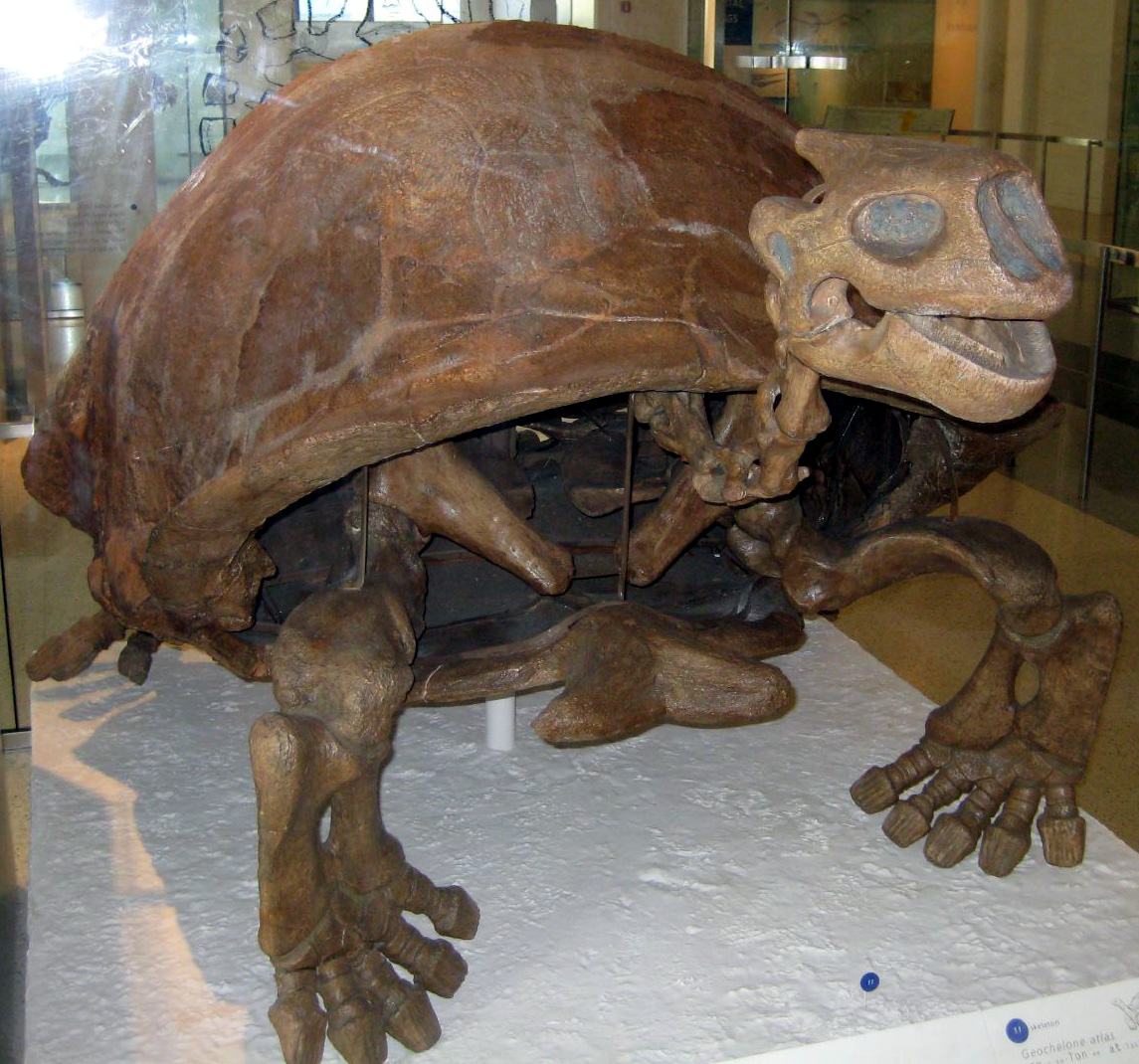
Skeleton of the gigantic tortoise Megalochelys atlas, the largest known to have ever existed, and one of the best known Sivalik fossils

The Sivalik Hills are known for fossils of vertebrates, spanning from the early Miocene to the Middle Pleistocene, around 18 million years ago to 600,000 years ago, and also for the Neogene and Pleistocene aged vertebrate fossils. Some of the best known fossils from the hills include Megalochelys atlas, the largest known tortoise to have ever existed, the sabertooth cat Megantereon falconeri, Sivatherium giganteum, the largest known giraffid, and the ape Sivapithecus.

Remains of the Lower-Middle Paleolithic Soanian culture dating to around 500,000 to 125,000 years Before Present were found in the Sivalik region. Contemporary to the Acheulean, the Soanian culture is named after the Soan Valley in the Sivalik Hills of Pakistan. The Soanian archaeological culture is found across Sivalik region in present-day India, Nepal and Pakistan.

== Ecosystem ==
The carbon stock and carbon sequestration rates of the Churia forests differ among different forest management regimes and are highest in protected areas. Early twentieth-century engineering studies of the Punjab Himalaya and adjoining Siwalik Hills provided some of the earliest documented recognition of the environmental consequences of deforestation in the region. Work by L. B. Holland and H. M. Glover (1930) explicitly linked the disappearance of forests in the outer Himalaya to increased surface runoff, soil erosion, reduced groundwater retention, and more frequent and severe flooding, noting that formerly forested catchments had become degraded, sediment-laden, and less capable of sustaining stable water supplies.

== See also ==
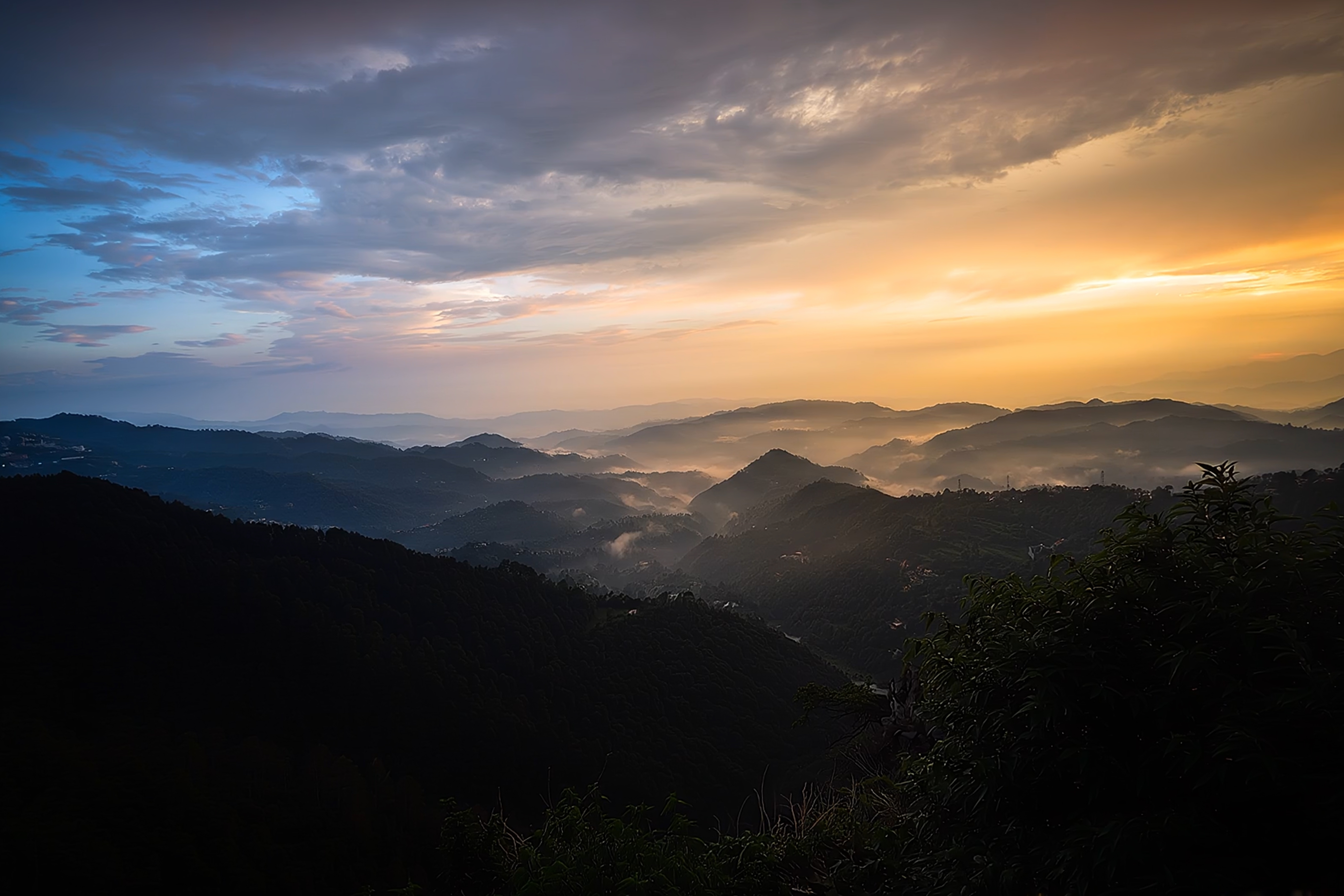
The Sivalik Hills, also known as Churia Hills, are a mountain range of the outer Himalayas.

Subranges of Sivalik

- Dundwa Range
- Margalla Hills
- Shivalik Fossil Park

Geological subdivisions of Himalayas

- Indus-Yarlung suture zone
- Karakoram fault system
- Nyenchen Tanglha Mountains
- Main Himalayan Thrust
- Lower Himalayan Range

Geographical subdivisions of Himalayas

- Western Himalayas
- Eastern Himalayas
- Indian Himalayan Region, Geology of Bhutan and Geology of Nepal
- Jammu and Kashmir (union territory), Geography of Ladakh, Gilgit-Baltistan and Geology of Pakistan
