= Euscolosuchus =

Euscolosuchus Temporal range: Late Triassic 237–228 Ma

Scientific classification
- Kingdom: Animalia
- Phylum: Chordata
- Class: Reptilia
- Clade: Pseudosuchia
- Clade: †Aetosauriformes
- Genus: †Euscolosuchus; Sues, 1992

Type species
- †Euscolosuchus olseni Sues, 1992

Extinct genus of reptiles

Euscolosuchus is an extinct genus of suchian archosaurs from the Late Triassic of Virginia. It is probably an aetosauriform, as the sister taxon to Acaenasuchus and a relative of aetosaurs.

== Discovery ==
Fossils have been found from the Tomahawk Creek Member of the Turkey Branch Formation (part of the Newark Supergroup), outcropping in the Richmond Basin of east-central Virginia. The locality from which the material was found dates back to the early Carnian stage of the Late Triassic, based on palynological studies. These strata are known for the abundance of fossil material belonging to tetrapod vertebrates in relation to other sites of the Newark Supergroup in the Richmond Basin that generally lack such material. The site is unique among others in the supergroup and closely resembles localities in the southern hemisphere, as is suggested by the presence of numerous fossils of traversodont cynodonts found from the area. Other tetrapods present include procolophonians, chiniquodontids, and sphenodonts.

== Description ==
The name Euscolosuchus, meaning "well pointed crocodile" in Greek, refers to the prominent lateral spikes projecting from the posterior cervical and dorsal osteoderms that are characteristic of the genus. These osteoderms imbricate (overlap) paramedially down the back and form a narrow dorsal carapace similar to the desmatosuchine stagonolepidids. A spinal table formed by broadened neural arches help support these osteoderms on the back. The scutes interlock with one another through a series of grooves and projections, with each plate overlapping the one posterior to it and having an anterolateral articulatory process project anteriorly from it and lie over the plate in front of it. These osteoderms, as well as the fragmentary vertebrae, are all that are known from the genus and thus the only material from which the genus can be classified.

== Classification ==
Euscolosuchus is widely considered to be a pseudosuchian, the side of archosaur reptiles which are more closely related to crocodiles than to birds and other dinosaurs. It was originally described as a close relative of crocodylomorphs, a long-lasting pseudosuchian clade that includes living crocodilians. Other pseudosuchians initially thought to be closely related to crocodylomorphs include the lightly-built Gracilisuchus and possibly Erpetosuchus. More recently, the large carnivorous rauisuchids such as Postosuchus have been singled out as the closest relatives of crocodylomorphs, and some early crocodylomorphs (such as Carnufex and Redondavenator) were similarly large carnivores.

In the midst of these interpretations of archosaur evolution, Euscolosuchus was left without clear affinities. Some compared it with Acaenasuchus, an equally ambiguous armored archosaur from the Chinle Formation. Acaenasuchus was generally considered a valid small aetosaur or juvenile fossils from an already established aetosaur genus. A 2020 redescription recovered Acaenasuchus and Euscolosuchus as sister taxa (each other's closest relative), and as members of the Aetosauriformes. This means that they were not true aetosaurs, but were still related to them. The herbivorous archosaur Revueltosaurus was also placed as an aetosauriform, a result recovered by many previous analyses.
