= Pekin Formation =

Geological formation in North Carolina

- Stratigraphic range: Late Carnian, ~231 Ma
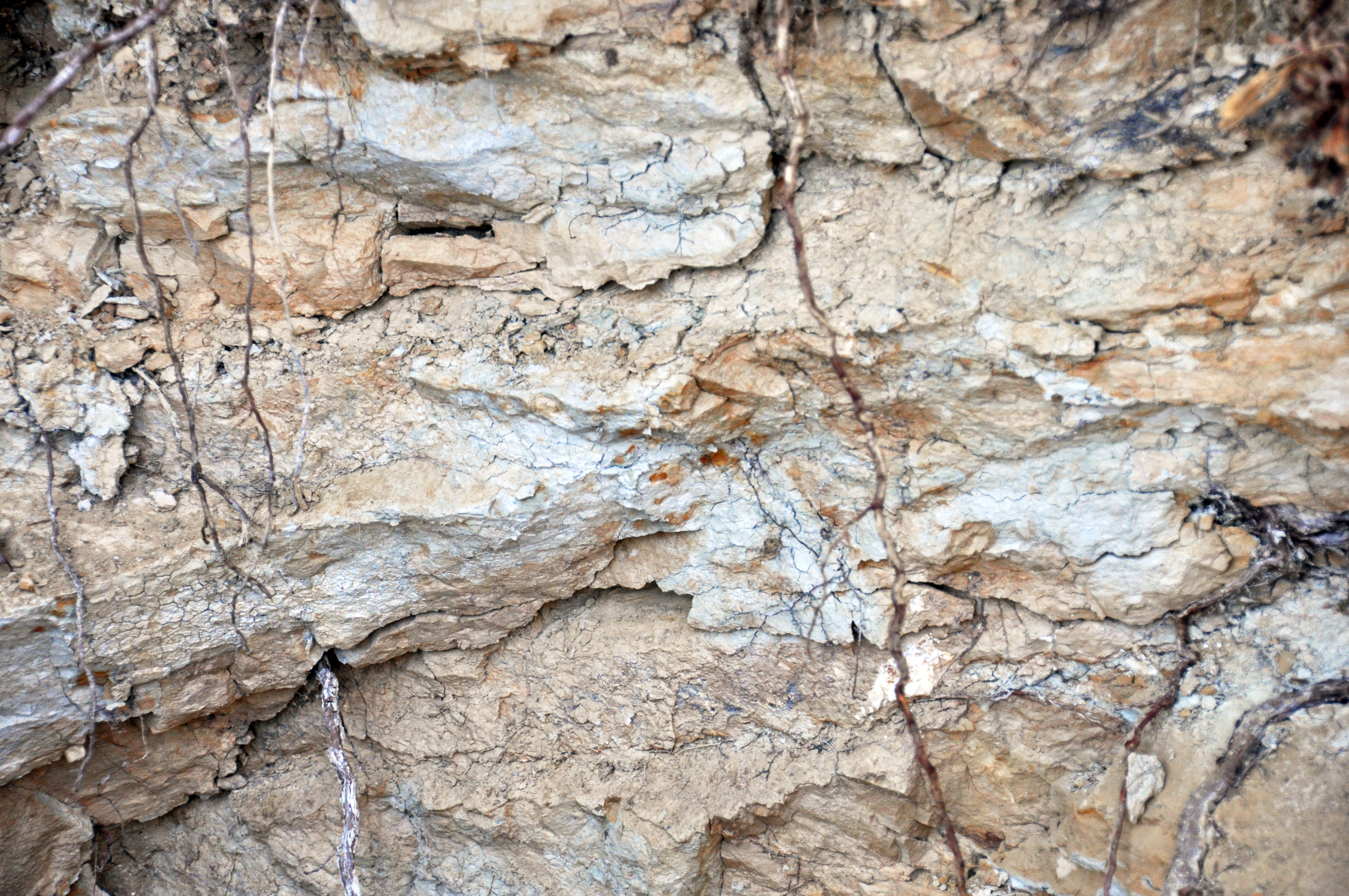
- Weathered claystones from the Pekin Formation
- Type: Geological formation
- Unit of: Chatham Group
- Underlies: Cumnock Formation
- Thickness: 542–1,240 metres (1,778–4,068 ft)

Lithology
- Primary: Sandstone
- Other: Siltstone, shale, conglomerate

Location
- Region: North Carolina
- Country: United States
- Extent: Sanford Sub-basin, Deep River Basin

Type section
- Named for: The village of Pekin, Montgomery County
- Named by: Campbell & Kimball
- Year defined: 1923
- Pekin Formation (North Carolina)

The Pekin Formation is a Late Triassic (Carnian) geological formation in North Carolina. The Pekin Formation is specific to the Sanford Sub-Basin of the Deep River Basin of North Carolina, although it may be equivalent to the Stockton Formation of Pennsylvania, New Jersey, and New York. The Pekin Formation was deposited in a rift basin along the Atlantic margin of North America during the breakup of the supercontinent Pangaea during the Late Triassic. The most common rocks in the Pekin Formation are red to brown sandstones, representing a terrestrial fluvial (riverine) and floodplain environment in a hot, humid climate. It has yielded both abundant plant and animal fossils, including some of the oldest potential dinosaur footprints in the world and the large predatory crocodylomorph Carnufex carolinensis.

== Description and history ==
On the surface, the Pekin Formation is exposed only as a long, narrow strip along the western edge of the Sanford Sub-basin. It is both the oldest and stratigraphically lowest formation in the sub-basin. As such, it unconformably overlies the much older eroded and metamorphosed Proterozoic to Cambrian aged metasediments and metavolcanic rocks of the Piedmont. The upper boundary grades into the overlying Cumnock Formation, distinguished by its fine-grained grey lacustrine sediments. The Pekin Formation was deposited in a half-graben that formed as part of a series of rift basins that make up the Newark Supergroup during the breakup of the supercontinent Pangaea and subsequent opening of the Atlantic Ocean.

As originally defined by Marius R. Campbell and Kent W. Kimball in 1923, the Pekin Formation spanned the entirety of the lower Deep River Basin, encompassing the lowest sedimentary units of the neighbouring Durham and the Wadesboro sub-basins. In fact, the Pekin Formation was named after the village of Pekin located in the Wadesboro Sub-basin, as this was where Campbell and Kimball (1923) considered it to be best exposed. However, although the three sub-basins share a broadly similar three-part stratigraphy, geologists have not been able to accurately correlate those of the Sanford Sub-basin with the other sub-basins due to variations in stratigraphy, lithology and biostratigraphy. Furthermore, the Pekin has a very similar lithology to the Sandford Formation, and are only distinguishable by the presence of the Cumnock Formation between them. As such, the Pekin, Cumnock and Sanford formations have been restricted to just the Sanford Sub-basin where they can be recognised.

In 2016, Robert E. Weems, Lawrence H. Tanner, and Spencer G. Lucas proposed that the Pekin Formation should be subsumed into the Stockton Formation. Rather than dividing the Newark Supergroup into numerous distinct formations localised in single basins, they proposed a system where the disparate formations of local basins were merged into fewer regional-scale formations, based upon overall similar lithologies, biostratigraphy and chronology. Under this scheme, the Pekin Formation is equivalent to and is synonymous with the Stockton Formation. The Pekin Formation could then be considered an informal name for the Stockton Formation exposed in the Sanford Sub-basin.

== Geology ==
The base of the formation is composed of a roughly 10 metres (33 ft) thick layer of grey conglomerate, historically referred to as "millstone grit". This unit has been interpreted as alluvial fan deposits made up of material derived from the Piedmont to the west flowing down in a southeasterly direction. The remainder of the Pekin Formation is made up of red to brown and purple sandstones, siltstones and mudstones, along with deposits of conglomerate and shale that altogether support a fluvial and floodplain deposition environment. Unlike the lowest layers, sedimentation for the rest of the Pekin Formation had switched to a source in the highlands to the southeast, with rivers and streams in the upper Pekin flowing towards the north and northwest. The overall climate is interpreted as being warm and humid with highly seasonal rainfall.

Clays from the Pekin Formation have been used extensively for the production of pottery, bricks and tiles, namely the Boren and Pomona pits. These two quarries have historically been the site of fossil discoveries, preserving both plants and animals, as well as trace fossils, although these quarries are now disused and some have filled with water. However, excavations by palaeontologists have been continued in a new brick quarry (Merry Oaks Quarry) by the North Carolina Museum of Natural Sciences (NCMNS) at a site labelled NCPALEO 1902. These excavations have uncovered various new vertebrate fossil discoveries, including the relatively complete remains of new Triassic archosaurs.

The age of the Pekin Formation has been estimated based on biostratigraphy and magnetostratigraphy to the Late Carnian (or Tuvalian), supported by correlations with faunas in western North America.

== Paleobiota ==
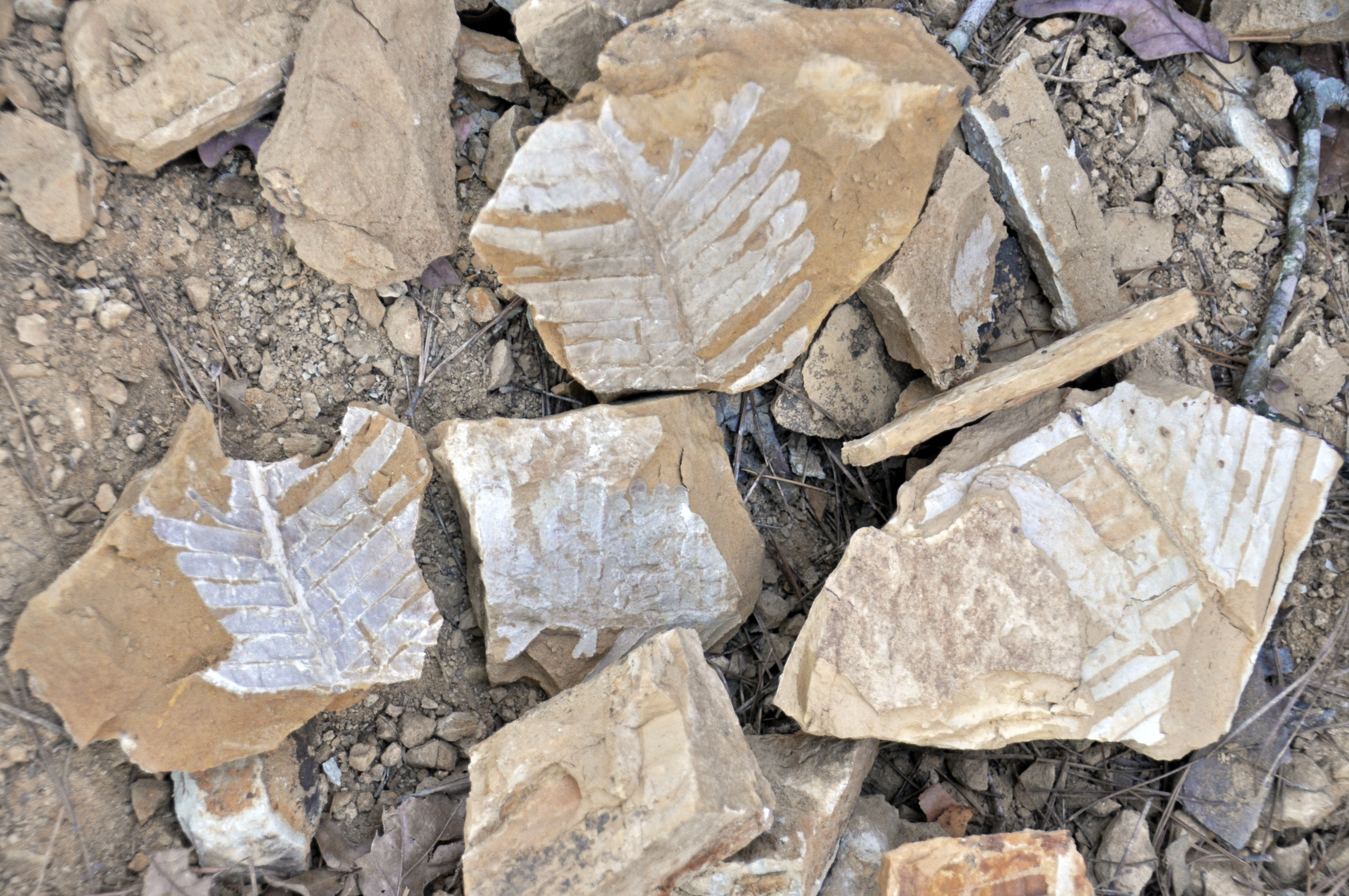
Fossil plants from the Pekin Formation, including Pekinopteris auriculata, Eoginkgoites, Neocalamites, Otozamites hespera, Cladophebis microphylla, Cynepteris lashiophora, Dictyophyllum, Phlebopteris smithii, and Hopetedion praetermissa.

A variety of plant and vertebrate fossils have been recovered from the Pekin Formation, the including partial skeletons of large vertebrates. The Boren pits preserves abundant plant megafossils, most commonly cycads and bennettitales, as well as horsetails, various ferns and conifers. Some of the most notable finds include an intact specimen of the early palm-like cycad Leptocycas gracilis, as well as a new species of the bennettitale Williamsonia, W. carolinensis, that preserves rare reproductive organs and suggests that it and the leaf Eoginkgoites belong to the same plant.

Invertebrate fossils from the Boren pits include conchostracans (clam shrimps) and clams, as well as numerous Scoyenia burrow trace fossils likely made by a crayfish-like decapod. Vertebrate remains are more common in the Pomona pit, which has preserved the fragmentary remains of archosaurs, phytosaurs, and synapsids, as well as fish bones and scales. Fossil footprints and trackways of tetrapods have also been recorded from the Pomona pit (with a single print from the Boren pit), including bipedal three-toed footprints that may have been made by early dinosaurs.

Only vertebrate fossils are known from the upper Pekin NCPALEO 1902 locality, and include a variety of archosaurs and synapsids typical of Late Triassic North America. The vertebrate fauna of the Pekin Formation has been used to correlate it with strata in western North America, such as the Chinle Formation, with some genera (e.g. Placerias, Coahomasuchus) being shared between eastern and western North America.

Color key: Taxon / Reclassified taxon / Taxon falsely reported as present / Dubious taxon or junior synonym / Ichnotaxon / Ootaxon / Morphotaxon	Notes; Uncertain or tentative taxa are in small text; ~~crossed out~~ taxa are discredited.

=== Archosauromorphs ===
==== Other archosauromorphs ====
The online collections of the North Carolina Museum of Natural Sciences list tooth fragments of "Archosaurus" sp. and Uatchitodon kroehleri, as well as a humerus fragment of "Rhynchosaurus" sp. Archosaurus and Rhynchosaurus are likely only provisional labels.

==== Phytosaurs ====
Phytosaurs of the Pekin Formation
Genus	Species	Location	Material	Notes	Images
Apatopus	A. lineatus	Pomona pit	Trackways and isolated prints.	Phytosaur footprints.	Rutiodon
Phytosauria indet.	Indeterminate	NCPALEO1902		Currently undescribed.	Rutiodon
?Rutiodon	?R. carolinensis		Rostrum fragment	Originally misidentified as the sacrum of a large fossil bird and named "Palaeonornis struthionoides".	Rutiodon

==== Pseudosuchians ====
Pseudosuchians of the Pekin Formation
Genus	Species	Location	Material	Notes	Images
cf. Brachychirotherium	cf. Brachychirotherium isp.	Pomona pit	Numerous isolated tracks.	Tracks similar to Brachychirotherium, but differ in having a functionally tridactyl foot with reduced first digit and fifth digit positioned further back. Lack unequivocal hand impressions.	Carnufex Longosuchus Revueltosaurus
Crocodylomorpha indet.	Indeterminate	NCPALEO 1902	A nearly complete articulated skeleton.	A small-bodied basal crocodylomorph, currently undescribed.	Carnufex Longosuchus Revueltosaurus
Carnufex	C. carolinensis	NCPALEO 1902	A partial skull and fragmentary postcranial skeleton.	A large, possibly bipedal predatory crocodylomorph.	Carnufex Longosuchus Revueltosaurus
Coahomasuchus	C. chathamensis	NCPALEO 1902	"Largely articulated, anterior portion of a skeleton".	A typothoracisine aetosaur.	Carnufex Longosuchus Revueltosaurus
Gorgetosuchus	G. pekinensis	NCPALEO 1902	10 articulated rows of osteoderms from the front half of the animal.	A desmatosuchine aetosaur. Unique among aetosaurs for having spines on both its dorsal and lateral osteoderms around the neck.	Carnufex Longosuchus Revueltosaurus
Longosuchus	Longosuchus sp.	Pomona pit	Osteoderms	A desmatosuchine aetosaur. Material referred to it may actually belong to Lucasuchus.	Carnufex Longosuchus Revueltosaurus
Lucasuchus	L. hunti	Pomona pit	Osteoderms	A desmatosuchine aetosaur.	Carnufex Longosuchus Revueltosaurus
~~Pekinosaurus~~	~~P. olseni~~			Possibly a herbivorous aetosauriform related to Revueltosaurus. Initially reported from the Pekin Formation, but actually from the overlying Cumnock Formation.	Carnufex Longosuchus Revueltosaurus
Poposauroidea indet.	Indeterminate	Pomona pit	Distal quarter of a left femur.	A probable non-shuvosaurid poposauroid, possibly similar to Poposaurus.	Carnufex Longosuchus Revueltosaurus
Revueltosaurus sp.			Teeth	Unpublished, listed in the online collections of the North Carolina Museum of Natural Sciences.	Carnufex Longosuchus Revueltosaurus

=== Synapsids ===
Synapsids of the Pekin Formation
Genus	Species	Location	Material	Notes	Images
Boreogomphodon	B. jeffersoni	NCPALEO 1902	Numerous skulls and postcranial skeletons.	A herbivorous traversodontid cynodont, also known from Virginia.	Placerias
Placerias	P. hesternus	Pomona pit	Fragmentary cranial and postcranial bones.	Originally identified only on the assumption that Placerias was the only dicynodont from Late Triassic North America, later examination confirmed this assignment.	Placerias
Stahleckeriidae indet.	Indeterminate	NCPALEO 1902	A partial complete skeleton preserving the back half of the animal just ahead of the sacrum.	A stahleckeriid dicynodont distinct from Placerias, currently undescribed and so its affinities are unclear.	Placerias

=== Fishes ===
Ray-finned fishes of the Pekin Formation
Genus	Species	Location	Material	Notes	Images
Redfieldiiformes indet.	Indeterminate		Undetermined scales and bones.	An indeterminate freshwater redfieldiid fish.	

=== Crustaceans ===
Crustaceans of the Pekin Formation
Genus	Species	Location	Material	Notes	Images
Cyzicus	C. sp.			A clam shrimp.	Cyzicus
Scoyenia	S. sp.			Traces of possible decapod burrows.	Cyzicus

=== Plants ===
A diverse flora is known from the formation:

Plants of the Pekin Formation
Genus	Species	Notes	Images
Cladophlebis	C. microphylla	Fronds of an indeterminate leptosporangiate fern.	Neocalamites
Compsostrobus	C. neotericus	Male & female cones and foliage of a compsostrobacean conifer.	Neocalamites
Clathopteris	C. sp.	Fronds of a dipterid fern.	Neocalamites
Cynepteris	C. sp.	Fronds of a cynepterid fern.	Neocalamites
Danaeopsis	D. sp.	Fronds of a marattiid fern.	Neocalamites
Eoginkgoites	E. sp.	Leaves of a williamsonacean bennettitale, superficially similar to those of ginkgos. Possibly the foliage of Williamsonia carolinensis.	Neocalamites
Ischnophyton	I. iconicum	A bennettitale stem.	Neocalamites
Leptocycas	L. gracilis	Leaves, stems, and cones of a cycad, including intact specimens. Possibly a member of the Zamiaceae.	Neocalamites
Lonchopteris	L. virginiensis	Fern fronds. The species has sometimes been considered referable to another fern genus, Cynepteris.	Neocalamites
Matridiostrobus	M. sp.	Female conifer cones.	Neocalamites
Neocalamites	N. virginiensis	Leaves and stems of a large neocalamitaceous equisetale (horsetail relative).	Neocalamites
Neocalamites	N. knowltoni	Leaves and stems of a large neocalamitaceous equisetale (horsetail relative).	Neocalamites
Otozamites	O. powelli	Leaves of a williamsonacean bennettitale.	Neocalamites
Otozamites	O. hespera	Leaves of a williamsonacean bennettitale.	Neocalamites
Pekinopteris	P. auriculata	Fronds of a schizaealean fern.	Neocalamites
Pelourdea	P. sp.	Conifer (possibly gnetophyte) leaves.	Neocalamites
Phlebopteris	P. smithii	Fronds of a matoniaceous fern.	Neocalamites
Phoenicopsis	P. sp.	Leaves of a czekanowskialean gymnosperm, distantly related to ginkgos.	Neocalamites
Pseudoctenis	P. sp.	Cycad leaves.	Neocalamites
Pterophyllum	P. sp.	Leaves of a williamsonacean bennettitale.	Neocalamites
Voltzia	V. andrewsii	Seed cones of a voltzian conifer.	Neocalamites
Williamsonia	W. carolinensis	Female reproductive structure of a williamsonacean bennettitale, possibly belonging to the same plant as Eoginkgoites.	Neocalamites
Wingatea	W. sp.	Fronds of a gleicheniaceous fern.	

== See also ==
- List of dinosaur-bearing rock formations
