= Geology of Bhutan =

The geology of Bhutan is less well studied than many countries in Asia, together with the broader Eastern Himalayas region. Older Paleozoic and Precambrian rocks often appear mixed together with younger sediments due to the Himalayan orogeny.

== Stratigraphy, tectonics and geologic history ==
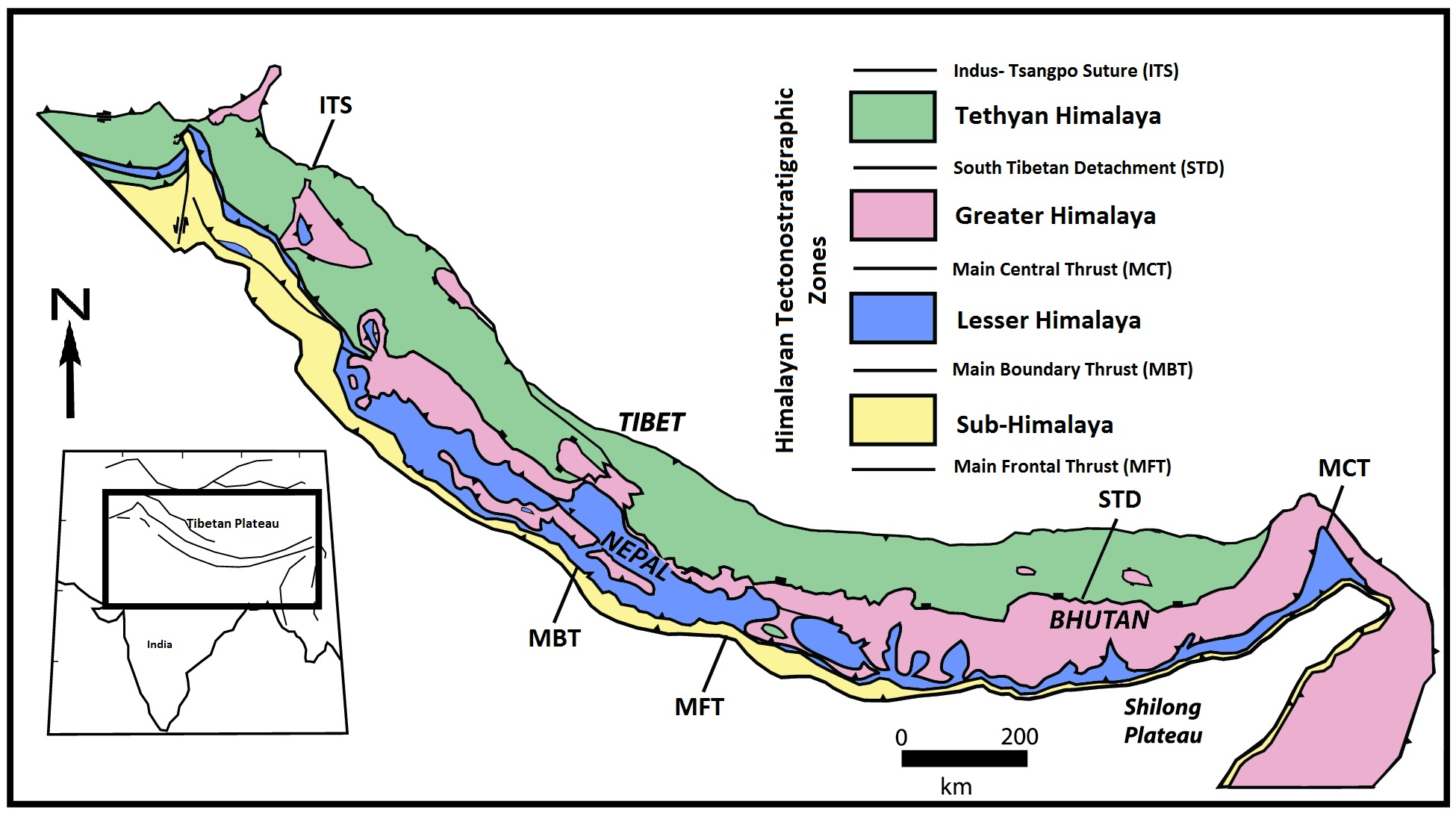
Map of Himalayan tectonostratigraphic zones

Geologic research in Bhutan began in the southwest between 1868 and 1907, followed by regional mapping in 1961 by the Geological Survey of India. Augusto Gansser led much of the geologic research from the late 1960s through the 1980s.

Some of the oldest rocks in Bhutan are part of the Indian Shield in the Shillong Basement—part of a foreland basin. The Bhutanese foothills are separated from Precambrian crystalline rock by the 35 kilometer foreland, where rocks are fold and faulted newer tectonic events and covered in Quaternary sediments. The South Himalayan molasse is represented by the Siwalik Belt, with four kilometers of siltstone, sandstone and conglomerates in the southeast.

The Damuda Belt dates to the Carboniferous and Permian in the Paleozoic with coal seams, plant remnants and lenses of much younger Eocene limestone included during the Himalayan orogeny.

The Lesser Himalayas, to the north of the Damuda Belt contain Precambrian sedimentary rocks such as slate, dolomite and several kilometers of quartzite. "Slices" of basement granite and gneiss form mylonite at the edges. These rocks are believed to be part of the Indian Shield and are one billion years old. Geologists also define the High Himalayan Crystalline rocks extending 150 kilometers from the Main Central Thrust to Tethys Ocean sediments in the north. Sillimanite, garnet and biotite are especially common in this area. The Takhtsang monastery, carved into Takhtsang gneiss, is surrounded by rocks with calcsilicate lenses, interpreted as the "hand and foot prints" of Padmasambhva—an important founder of Bhutanese holy sites. This gneiss grades toward migmatite, at higher elevations such as Masang Kang mountain. Geologists have dated the rock to 500 to 400 million years ago. The Paro marbles are widespread in southwest, forming massifs, while leucogranites are common in dikes, sills and plutons in the northeast. Tethyan sediments outcrop along the Tibetan border. The Lingshi Basin is one example, beginning with a foundation of marble and phyllite lying atop older crystalline rock, overlain by tillite and limestone. In the basin, migmatite gneiss is transgressed by calc-schist, breccia, quartzite, limestone and recrystallized fossils. The Tang Chu Basin, on the other hand, holds Devonian rocks and fossils.

Young faults and fracture zones formed in the last 2.5 million years of the Quaternary. These recent tectonic features are found in the central and east, often associated with hot springs. Research published in 1983 indicated seven glacial periods during the Pleistocene, based on terminal moraine distribution.

== Natural resource geology ==
Bhutan has small gypsum deposits in the Kuru Chu spur and limestones in the foothills of the Himalayas which are extracted locally for the cement industry. Coal seams, with 25 percent ash, are scattered throughout the Damudas region. The Tang-Chu area has high-quality Devonian slate used for roofing.
