= Sanford Formation =

- Stratigraphic range: Late Triassic, Norian
- Type: Formation
- Unit of: Chatham Group
- Overlies: Cumnock Formation

Lithology
- Primary: conglomerate, sandstone, mudstone

Location
- Region: North Carolina
- Country: United States

Type section
- Named for: Sanford, North Carolina
- Named by: Campbell & Kimball, 1923

The Sanford Formation is a Late Triassic (Norian)-age geologic formation in North Carolina. It is mainly found in the Sanford sub-basin of the Deep River Basin, the southernmost of the large Mesozoic basins forming the Newark Supergroup. It is the highest unit of the Chatham Group, overlying the dark lake and swamp sediments of the Cumnock Formation. The Sanford Formation is composed primarily of coarse red sediments such as conglomerates, sandstones, and mudstones. The conglomerate layers contain pebbles of schist and slate, with the occasional large boulders of granite.

The Sanford Formation is likely equivalent to the Norian-age Passaic Formation of the Newark Basin in the northeastern United States. The lower part of the Sanford Formation has also been closely correlated with middle layers ("Lithofacies Association II") of the Durham sub-basin of the Deep River Basin. Though Sanford-equivalent strata are less clearly differentiable in the Durham sub-basin, they are also much more fossiliferous in that area.
