= Deep River Basin =

Triassic rift basin in North Carolina

- Stratigraphic range: Late Triassic
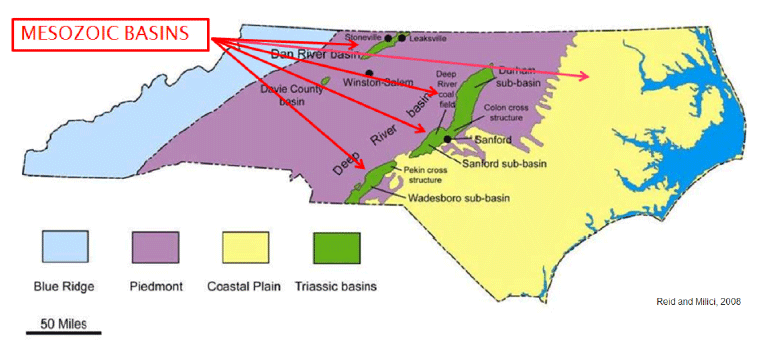
- The location of Mesozoic rift basins in North Carolina
- Type: Rift Valley
- Unit of: Newark Supergroup
- Sub-units: Chatham Group (Sanford Formation, Cumnock Formation, Pekin Formation)
- Area: 1,440 square miles (3,730 km^{2})
- Thickness: up to 7,100 feet (2,160 m)

Lithology
- Primary: Siltstone, Sandstone, Conglomerate, Mudstone
- Other: Diabase, Basalt

Location
- Location: Eastern Piedmont of North Carolina
- Coordinates: 35.8157°N 78.902°W
- Region: Southeastern United States
- Country: United States
- Extent: 150 miles (240 km)

Type section
- Named for: Deep River

Location of the Deep River Basin

The Deep River Basin is an ancient rift basin in the Piedmont of North Carolina. It formed in the Late Triassic during the initial breakup of the supercontinent Pangea. The formation of the basin preceded a much larger volcanic event known as the Central Atlantic magmatic province (CAMP), one of the largest eruptions in Earth's history. The Deep River Basin is one of a series of Late Triassic–Early Jurassic rift basins along the east coast of North America; collectively they are called the Newark Supergroup.

== Geology ==
The Deep River basin was formed by continental rifting. The initial break up of Pangea created a series of irregularly shaped half-grabens along the future Atlantic margin of eastern North America. The Deep River basin represents the southernmost exposure of the Newark Supergroup basins. Rifting began tens of millions of years before CAMP eruptions took place. As the basin deepened, it filled with late Triassic clastic sediments.

The Triassic sediments which fill the Deep River Basin are known as the Chatham Group. This geological group is split into three formations, from youngest to oldest: the Pekin Formation, Cumnock Formation, and Sanford Formation.

The amount of sediment deposited was strongly controlled by local basin tectonics. These events created alluvial fans which prograded into the basin from the surrounding highlands. Sediment was also transported along the basin by river systems inside the rift valley, which was then deposited in large alluvial plains. Freshwater lakes formed in the basin, accumulating delta, lake, and swamp deposits.

Much like the Dan River Group further west, there is no evidence of surface lava flows like further north in places like the Culpeper Basin. Instead, there are numerous diabase sills at the surface today. Many of these cut across the Jonesboro fault, which makes up the eastern boundary of the rift valley.

== The Deep River ==
Today, the Deep River runs through the low points of the rift. It is responsible for draining around 1,440 km2 of land from the central Piedmont in North Carolina. Deep River is a major tributary of the Cape Fear River, which then drains into the Atlantic Ocean. The Deep River covers about 15% of the Cape Fear River drainage basin, which runs through Forsyth, Guilford, Alamance, Chatham, Moore, Montgomery, and Lee County counties
