= Geology of Pakistan =

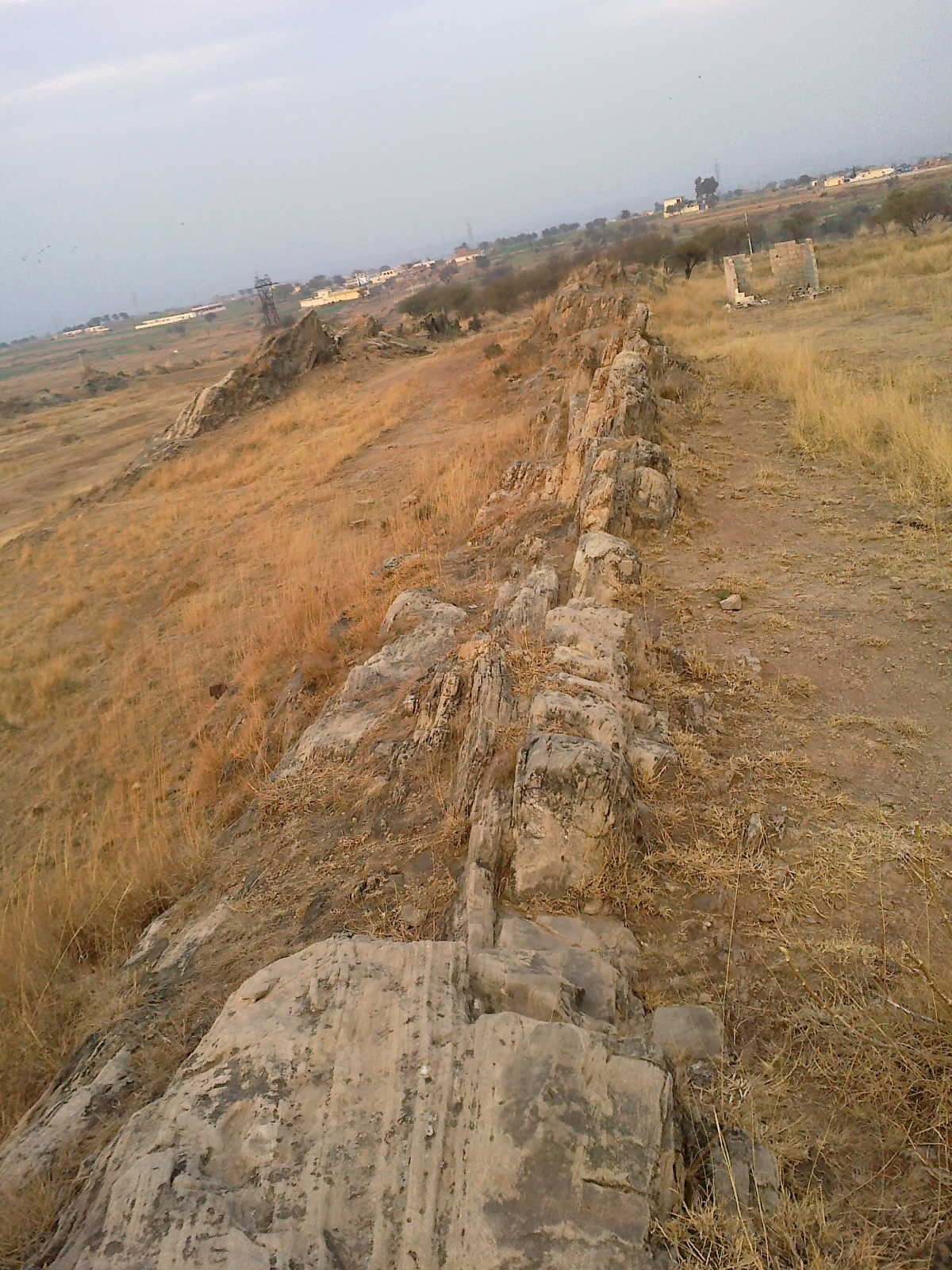
Rawat Fault line near Islamabad

The geology of Pakistan encompasses the varied landscapes that make up the land constituting modern-day Pakistan, which are a blend of its geological history, and its climate over the past few million years.

The Geological Survey of Pakistan is the premier agency responsible for studying the country's geology.

== Tectonic zone ==
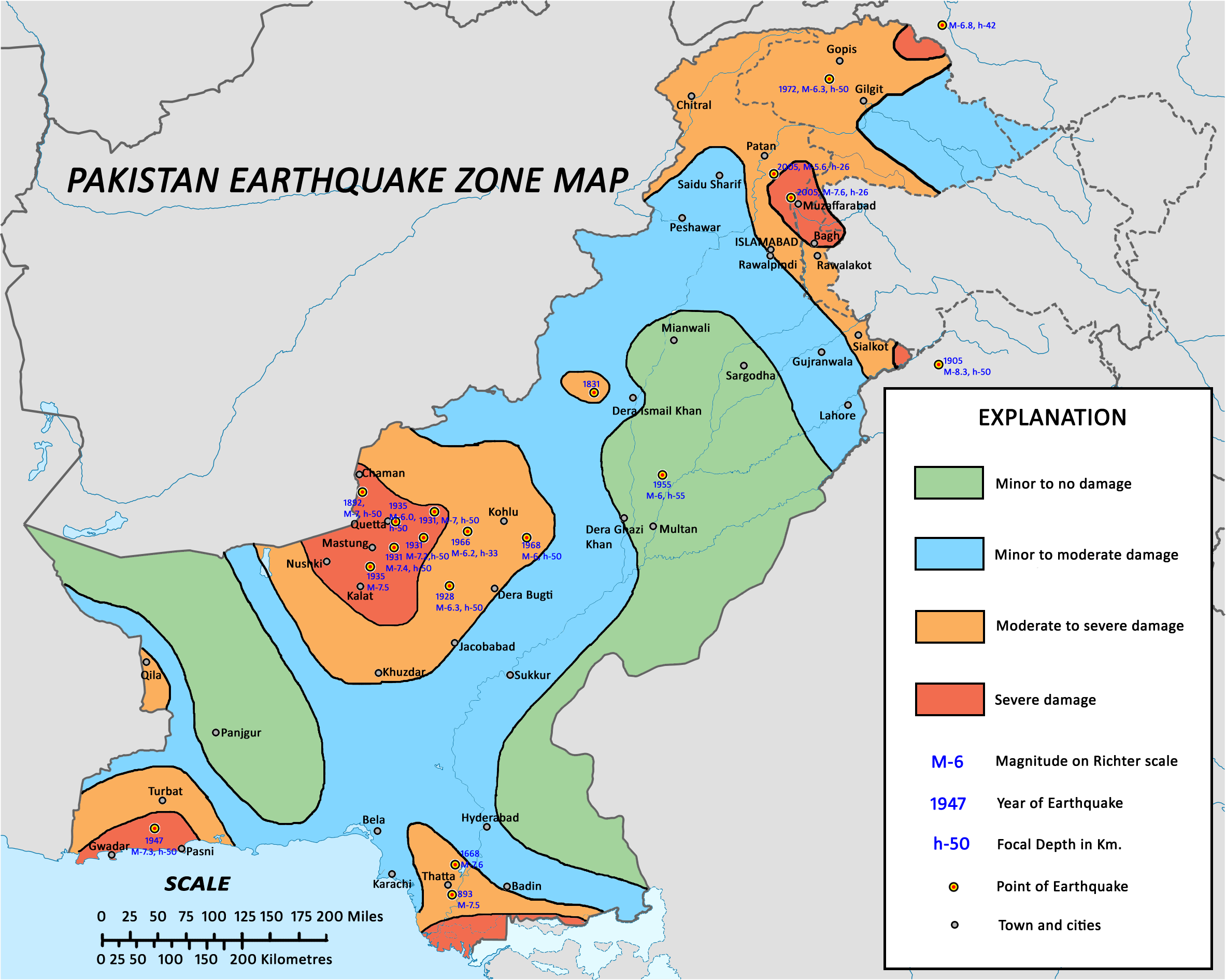
Earthquake hazard zones of Pakistan

Pakistan geologically overlaps both with the Indian and the Eurasian tectonic plates where its Sindh and Punjab provinces lie on the Indian plate while western parts of Balochistan and parts of Khyber-Pakhtunkhwa lie on the Eurasian plate which mainly comprises the Iranian plateau although reaching on the Indian plate, albeit bordering the Arabian plate on the extreme southwest and the Hindu Kush from the Afghan-Pakistan border. Azad Kashmir lie's on the Western Himalaya's while Northern Areas lie on the almost northern end of South Asia most of the region is part of the Greater Himalayan Mountain Region much more close to Central Asia and hence are prone to violent earthquakes where the two Indian and Eurasian tectonic plates collided leading to the region having the world's highest mountains.

== Earthquakes ==
Since it lies in the centre of tectonic plates, Pakistan has been vulnerable to a number of deadly earthquakes.

== Mining ==
Mining is an important industry in Pakistan. Pakistan has deposits of several mineral products including coal, copper, gold, chromite, mineral salt, bauxite and several other minerals. There are also a variety of precious and semi-precious minerals that are mined. These include peridot, aquamarine, topaz, ruby, emerald, rare-earth minerals bastnaesite and xenotime, sphene, tourmaline, and many varieties of quartz.

The Pakistan Mineral Development Corporation is the responsible authority for the support and development of the mining industry. Gemstones Corporation of Pakistan looks after the interests of stake holders in gemstone mining and polishing as an official entity. Baluchistan province is the richest in mineral resources available in Pakistan. While recently coal deposits have been discovered in Thar, Sindh. Khyber Pakhtunkhwa is rich in gemstones. Most of the mineral gems found in Pakistan exist here. Apart from oil, gas and some mineral used in nuclear energy purposes which comes directly under federal control mining of other minerals is provincial issue. Currently around 52 minerals, are mined and processed in Pakistan.

== Petroleum resources ==
Oil and gas production began in Pakistan in the early 20th century. Current production is concentrated in the lower Indus Basin and in Kohat-Potwar geologic province. Petroleum systems in the Kohat-Potwar province exist due to continental collision between the Indian passive continental margin and the Eurasian Plate. The composite petroleum system in the Kohat-Potwar province is referred to as the Patala-Nammal Composite Total Petroleum System. Petroleum source rocks range in age from Eocambrian through Miocene and are dominated by type II and type III kerogens. Maturation of hydrocarbons in the system increase from north to south and dramatically rise past the Himalayan Main Boundary Thrust. Initial generation of hydrocarbons began in Late Cretaceous passive margin sediments and renewed in a secondary generation phase during the last 20-15 Ma along with rapid fill and overburden in the Himalayan foreland basin. Migration of hydrocarbons is facilitated via extensive thrust faulting. Approximately 60% of reservoirs in the Patala-Nammal system are Eocene passive margin carbonates but other Miocene, Permian, Jurassic and even Cambrian sedimentary formations show sufficient porosity and permeability. Most of the successful plays have concentrated on overturned and faulted anticlinal traps. These anticlines strike generally northeast to southwest and verge in the direction of plate collision. These anticlines have formed in the last 5 Ma. Fields in the Patala-Nammal system have an estimated total volume of 700 million barrels of oil equivalent and may prove economic in the coming decades.

== See also ==
- List of minerals of Pakistan
