= Galtonia gibbidens =

Galtonia gibbidens Temporal range: Late Triassic, ~230–205.6 Ma

Scientific classification
- Domain: Eukaryota
- Kingdom: Animalia
- Phylum: Chordata
- Class: Reptilia
- Clade: Archosauromorpha
- Clade: Archosauriformes
- Clade: Crurotarsi
- Genus: †Galtonia; Hunt & Lucas, 1994
- Species: †G. gibbidens

Binomial name
- †Galtonia gibbidens (Cope, 1878)

Synonyms
- Thecodontosaurus gibbidens Cope, 1878 (type species)

Extinct species of reptile

Galtonia is an extinct genus of pseudosuchian from the Late Triassic. It is known from remains found in the Late Triassic-aged New Oxford Formation of Pennsylvania, which were first described by Edward Drinker Cope in 1878.

The type and only species, G. gibbidens, was originally named Thecodontosaurus gibbidens in 1878, but was moved to a new genus by Hunt and Lucas in 1994. It is based on the lectotype AMNH 2339, discovered by C. M. Wheatley. There is also a genus of flower with the name Galtonia, however a genus in one kingdom may have the same name as a genus in another kingdom so this is permitted.

Galtonia, upon being identified as its own genus separate from Thecodontosaurus, was initially classified as an ornithischian, but was seen to be Revueltosaurus, which is actually a non-dinosaurian archosaur. Irmis et al. (2006) even assigned Galtonia to Revueltosaurus. Galtonia is now seen as a possible synonym of Revueltosaurus.
