= Chatham Group =

Triassic-age geologic group in the United States

- Stratigraphic range: Triassic
- Type: Group
- Unit of: Newark Supergroup
- Sub-units: Doswell Formation, Stockton Formation, Lockatong Formation, Passaic Formation, Manassas Sandstone
- Underlies: Meriden Group
- Overlies: Acadia Group

Location
- Region: Eastern United States
- Country: United States

The Chatham Group is a Triassic-age geologic group in the eastern United States. It is one of the most fossiliferous sections of the Newark Supergroup, preserving much of the Late Triassic up until the Triassic-Jurassic mass extinction. The group was originally named to refer to Triassic rocks (the Pekin, Cumnock, and Sanford formations) specifically within the Deep River Basin of North Carolina. Later studies have utilized it to encompass Late Triassic strata in most other sedimentary basins in the Newark Supergroup.
