= Krzyzanowskisaurus =

Krzyzanowskisaurus Temporal range: Late Triassic, ~221.5–201.6 Ma

Scientific classification
- Domain: Eukaryota
- Kingdom: Animalia
- Phylum: Chordata
- Class: Reptilia
- Clade: Archosauromorpha
- Clade: Archosauriformes
- Clade: Eucrocopoda
- Clade: Crurotarsi (?)
- Genus: †Krzyzanowskisaurus; Heckert, 2005
- Species: †K. hunti

Binomial name
- †Krzyzanowskisaurus hunti (Heckert, 2002)

Synonyms
- Revueltosaurus hunti? Heckert, 2002

Genus of reptiles

Krzyzanowskisaurus (meaning "Stan Krzyżanowski's lizard") is the name given to a genus of archosaur from the Late Triassic-aged Chinle Formation and it is a tooth taxon, based on fossils only of teeth (such as the holotype tooth NMMNH P-29357) and these teeth have been found in the U.S. states of Arizona (including the type locality) and New Mexico. The original report described it as a "probable ornithischian" and Heckert (2005) suggests that Krzyzanowskisaurus teeth have biostratigraphic utility as an index fossil of the St. Johnsian sub-LVF (land-vertebrate faunachron).

The type species, Krzyzanowskisaurus hunti, was reevaluated by Heckert in 2005, after previously being described by him as Revueltosaurus hunti in 2002. The name was changed when it was discovered that the type species of Revueltosaurus, R. callenderi, was a pseudosuchian rather than an ornithischian dinosaur (Parker et al. 2005). According to Heckert, "R." hunti displays an orithischian-like feature not present in R. callenderi (teeth possessing a cingulum), suggesting that it represents a new genus of early ornithischian. This was challenged by Irmis et al. (2006), who found that the cingulum differed from that in true early ornithischians, and noted that some teeth had been found with skull bones and osteoderms that matched those of Revueltosaurus. Thus, they found that it was not a dinosaur, and provisionally retained it in Revueltosaurus; it may once again be R. hunti.
