= Scoyenia =

Trace fossil

Scoyenia is an ichnogenus found in paleozoic-mesozoic strata in North America. It appears to be the preserved remains of arthropod feeding burrows.

== See also ==
- Ichnology
