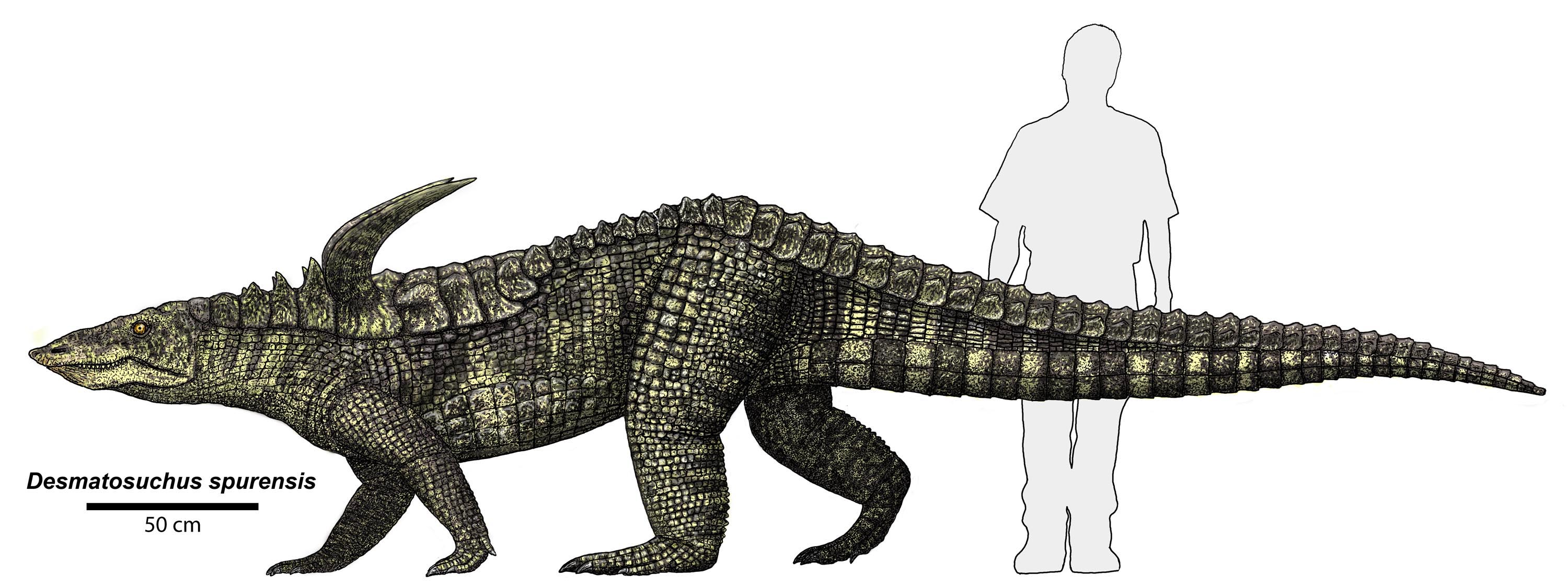
- Life restoration and size diagram of Desmatosuchus spurensis, an aetosaur.

Scientific classification
- Kingdom: Animalia
- Phylum: Chordata
- Class: Reptilia
- Clade: Archosauria
- Clade: Pseudosuchia
- Clade: Suchia
- Clade: †Aetosauriformes; Parker et al., 2021

Subgroups
- †Acaenasuchus; †Euscolosuchus; †Revueltosaurus; †Aetosauria

= Aetosauriformes =

Aetosauriforms Temporal range: Late Triassic, 237–201.3 Ma

Extinct clade of reptiles

Aetosauriformes is an extinct clade of early-diverging pseudosuchians (the group of archosaurs that contains modern crocodylians and their stem group relatives). It includes the aetosaurs, a group of heavily armoured and at least partially herbivorous pseudosuchians, as well as the closely related genera Acaenasuchus, Euscolosuchus and Revueltosaurus.

== Classification ==
Aetosauriformes was named in 2021 by William G. Parker and colleagues, as part of a redescription of the species Revueltosaurus callenderi. It is a stem-based taxon, defined as the most inclusive clade that contains Acaenasuchus geoffreyi, Aetosaurus ferratus, Desmatosuchus spurensis and Revueltosaurus callenderi, but not Erpetosuchus granti, Ornithosuchus woodwardi, Poposaurus gracilis, Postosuchus kirkpatricki, Rutiodon carolinensis, Crocodylus niloticus (the Nile crocodile) or Passer domesticus (the house sparrow).

Parker and colleagues performed a phylogenetic analysis using a modified version of the data matrix of Nesbitt et al. (2011). Aetosauriformes was recovered as the sister group of the family Erpetosuchidae, with the two groups forming the earliest-diverging clade within Suchia. A simplified cladogram from that study is shown below:

- - Phytosauria
  - Archosauria
    - Avemetatarsalia
    - Pseudosuchia
      - Ornithosuchidae
      - Suchia
        - - Gracilisuchidae
          - Paracrocodylomorpha
        - - Erpetosuchidae
          - Aetosauriformes
            - - Acaenasuchus
              - Euscolosuchus
            - Revueltosaurus
            - Aetosauria
