= Cumnock Formation =

Geologic formation in North Carolina, US

- Stratigraphic range: Late Triassic, early Norian
- Type: Formation
- Unit of: Chatham Group
- Underlies: Sanford Formation
- Overlies: Pekin Formation

Lithology
- Primary: shale
- Other: coal, sandstone, siltstone

Location
- Region: North Carolina
- Country: United States

The Cumnock Formation is a Late Triassic-age geologic formation in North Carolina. It is found in the Sanford sub-basin of the Deep River Basin, the southernmost of the large Mesozoic basins forming the Newark Supergroup. It is the middle unit of the Chatham Group, overlying the Pekin Formation and underlying the Sanford Formation. Both of these encompassing formations are primarily red sandstone. The Cumnock Formation, on the other hand, represents a sequence of darker lacustrine (lake) or paludal (swampy/marshy) sediments deposited in a tropical climate. These primarily include shales and coal, with some thin layers of coarser sediment such as siltstone and sandstone.

The formation preserves some fossils, including a diverse assemblage of microvertebrates (tiny fragments of vertebrate fossils) from a quarry near Moncure, NC. Palynology and general geological characteristics suggest that the Cumnock Formation is equivalent in age to the Cow Branch Formation of the Dan River/Danville basin on the Virginia-North Carolina border. It has also been compared to the Stockton and Lockatong formations of the Newark Basin in the northeastern United States. Some authors even reduce the Cumnock Formation to a member of the Lockatong Formation, in a broad interpretation of the latter. The Cumnock Formation is probably early Norian in age based on comparisons to similar strata in the eastern United States, as well as early sections of the Chinle Formation further west.

== See also ==
- List of fossiliferous stratigraphic units in North Carolina
