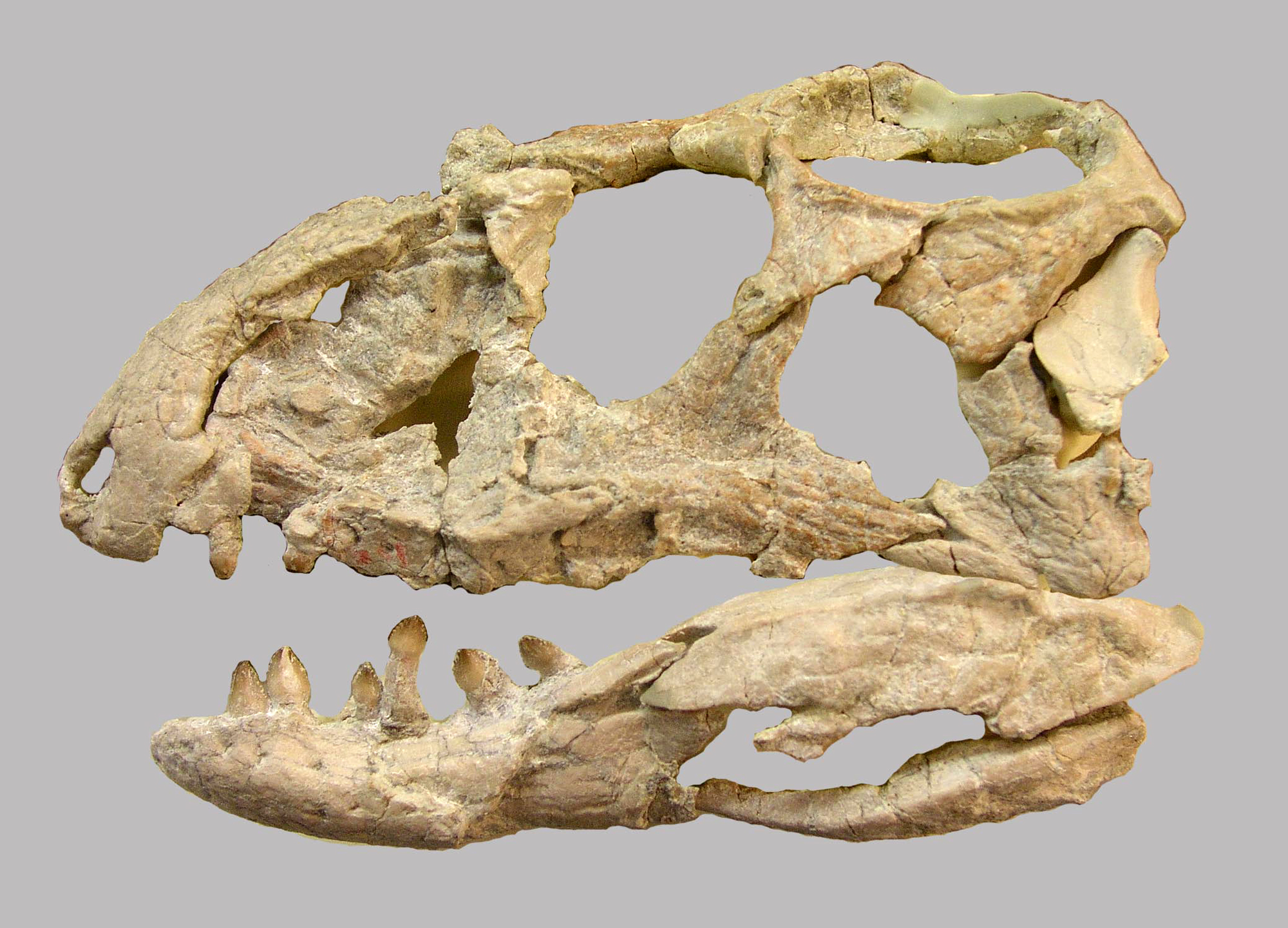
- Skull

Scientific classification
- Kingdom: Animalia
- Phylum: Chordata
- Class: Reptilia
- Clade: Pseudosuchia
- Clade: †Aetosauriformes
- Genus: †Revueltosaurus; Hunt, 1989

Species
- †R. callenderi Hunt, 1989 (type); †"R". olseni? (Hunt & Lucas, 1994); †"R". hunti? Heckert, 2002

Synonyms
- Krzyzanowskisaurus? Heckert, 2002; Pekinosaurus? Hunt & Lucas, 1994; Galtonia? Hunt & Lucas, 1994

= Revueltosaurus =

Revueltosaurus Temporal range: Late Triassic, 225–209.5 Ma

Extinct genus of reptiles

Revueltosaurus ("Revuelto lizard") is an extinct genus of suchian pseudosuchian from Late Triassic (late Carnian to middle Norian stage) deposits of New Mexico, Arizona and North Carolina, United States. Many specimens, mostly teeth, have been assigned to Revueltosaurus over the years. Currently, three species are included in this genus, all of which were originally thought to represent monospecific genera of basal ornithischian dinosaurs. Revueltosaurus was about 1 meter (3.3 feet) long.

== Species ==
=== Revueltosaurus callenderi ===
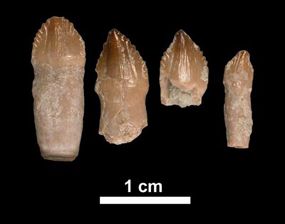
Teeth of Revueltosaurus callenderi collected in Petrified Forest National Park

R. callenderi was named by Adrian P. Hunt in 1989 and it is the type species of the genus. The generic name honors its type locality, Revuelto Creek, Quay County of New Mexico. Revuelto is derived from Spanish revuelta, "revolution", in reference to the importance of the Late Triassic period for terrestrial vertebrate evolution. The specific name honours the director of the New Mexico Museum of Natural History Jonathan F. Callender. R. callenderi was originally described as a basal ornithischian on the basis of 32 teeth: the holotype NMMNH P-4957 a nearly complete premaxillary (incisiform) tooth, the paratypes (NMMNH P-4958-9, a nearly complete maxillary or dentary tooth crown with root and a nearly complete premaxillary tooth crown) and 28 referred specimens. All specimens were collected from the type locality, from the Bull Canyon Formation, dating to the Norian stage.

Later, other teeth were described by Padian (1990), Kaye and Padian (1994) and Hunt and Lucas (1994), from Chinle Formation of Arizona. Andrew B. Heckert (2002) redescribed the genus in detail and named a second species, R. hunti on the basis of teeth described by Hunt and Lucas (1994). He referred MNA V3690, an isolated tooth assigned by Kaye and Padian (1994) to R. callenderi from the Placerias/Downs quarry near St Johns, Arizona, to Tecovasaurus. Heckert listed the referred specimens CMNH PR1697-1699 originally described by Padian (1990) and the topotypes NMMNH P-4960, P-16573, P-33783-798. Four teeth were referred to aff. Revueltosaurus callenderi (NMMNH P-17362, P-17382 and P-17187). R. callenderi is known to date only from the Revueltian (early-mid Norian, the type locality dates back to the early Norian) of Bull Canyon Formation (Dockum Group, New Mexico) and the Painted Desert of the Petrified Forest Member (Chinle Formation, Arizona). Parker et al. (2005) described several partially complete skeletons of R. callenderi (PEFO 33787-95), including a nearly complete and a partial skulls, from the Revueltosaurus Quarry, Petrified Forest National Park. Other skeletons were discovered from the Painted Desert, including the nearly complete specimen PEFO 34561 which have been fully reconstructed recently. According to Sterling J. Nesbitt (2011), much of the Revueltosaurus cranial and postcranial material originates from a monotypic bonebed. Some specimens occur as isolated bones, while others are completely associated and even fully articulated. Thus, nearly the entire skeleton of R. callenderi is known and a full description of it is being prepared. It is also thought that the osteoderms on the end of the tail form a "tail club."

=== Revueltosaurus hunti ===
R. hunti was named by Andrew B. Heckert in 2002 as a basal ornithischian. The specific name honours the paleontologist Adrian P. Hunt for his contributions to the Triassic paleontology. It is known from the holotype NMMNH P-29357, a nearly complete tooth crown, the paratypes NMMNH P-29358-9 and topotypes P-29347-54 (and aff. R. hunti specimens NMMNH P-29355, P-29359) which were collected in the NMMNH locality 1171, Santa Fe County, New Mexico from the Los Esteros Member of the Santa Rosa Formation, Chinle Group, dating to the latest Carnian stage (Adamanian). Other isolated teeth (which Long and Murry (1995) assigned to R. callenderi) were collected two localities in the Blue Hills, east-central Arizona, from the Blue Mesa Member of the Chinle Formation, dating also to the latest Carnian. UCMP locality V92048 have yielded the topotypes UCMPV 173839-41, and the referred teeth UCMPV 139563-75 are from UCMP locality V7307.

Parker et al. (2005) confirmed that R. hunti may be assignable to Revueltosaurus, on the basis of undescribed squamosal collected from its referred locality that is nearly identical to that seen in the Petrified Forest material of R. callenderi, thus suggesting that R. hunti is a pseudosuchian. In response to the report that R. callenderi was not an ornithischian, Heckert (2005) erected a new genus for R. hunti, Krzyzanowskisaurus. He suggested that the denticulated shelf on the teeth represented a cingulum. Irmis et al. (2007) and Nesbitt et al. (2007) synonymized Krzyzanowskisaurus with Revueltosaurus, and argued that this condition of the dentation is an autapomorphy of R. hunti and is not homologous to the ornithischian asymmetric swelling or a mammalian cingulum.

=== Revueltosaurus olseni ===
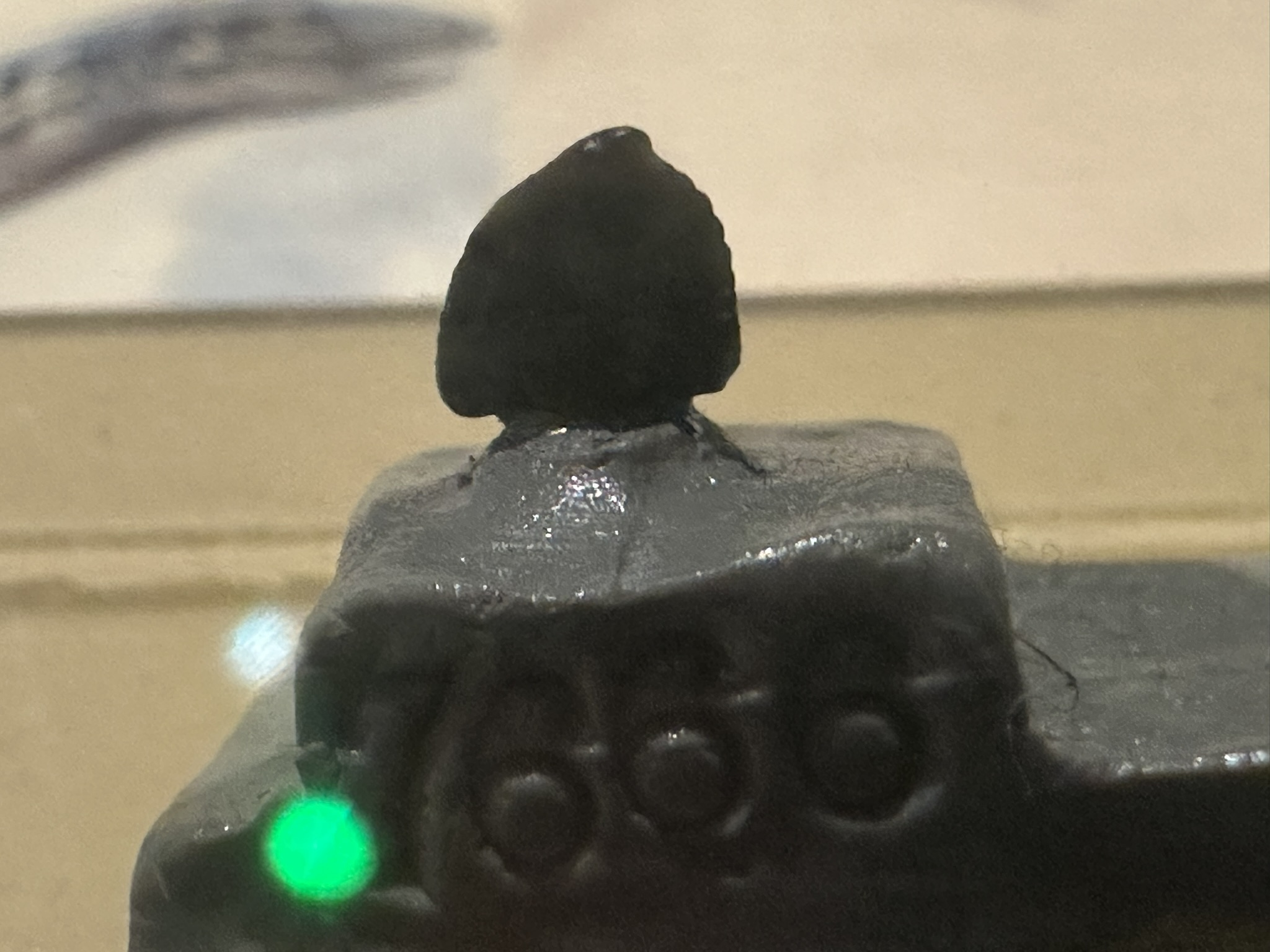
Tooth of R. olseni, North Carolina Museum of Natural Sciences

R. olseni was named by Hunt and Lucas in 1994 as a basal ornithischian, under the generic name Pekinosaurus. The generic name honors Pekin, North Carolina, where its type series was collected. The specific name honours the paleontologist Paul E. Olsen. Hunt and Lucas named the genus on the basis of the teeth series YPM 7666-9. Note that they designed the holotype to be YPM 8545, but the correct designation is YPM 7666 following Heckert et al. (2012). The type series of R. olseni was thought to originate from the Pekin Formation of Montgomery County. Heckert et al. (2012) noted that recent field work has shown that strata formerly assigned to that formation, including the type locality of R. olseni, actually pertain to the overlying Cumnock Formation (located in the Sanford Subbasin, Deep River Basin). Hence, the type locality and the newly discovered Moncure locality are from the same stratigraphic interval. The Cumnock Formation belongs to the Chathan Group (of the Newark Supergroup), which is recognized as Late Triassic in age. Most workers have assigned the Cumnock Formation a Carnian age. Most recent work, however, demonstrates that much of it is in fact Norian in age. Therefore, the strata exposed at the Moncure locality are probably early Norian in age. The Moncure locality have yielded many referred specimens of R. olseni including NCSM 21647, NCSM 23539, 41-46, 48-50, 52-57, NCSM 24722, 58-62 and NCSM 25194-227. NCSM 24728, 25192-3 and 25228 were referred to ?Revueltosaurus. Some osteoderms were referred to it to, as they very similar to those seen in the Petrified Forest material of R. callenderi. R. olseni is thought to be one of the most common tetrapods from its assemblage.

Irmis et al. (2007) and Nesbitt et al. (2007) tentatively synonymized Pekinosaurus (and Galtonia) with Revueltosaurus, and refer its type series to Revueltosaurus sp. They noted that Hunt and Lucas (1994) did not provide any differential diagnosis, autapomorphies, or unique combination of characters for Pekinosaurus. Furthermore, they argued that it cannot be differentiated from R. callenderi. Heckert et al. (2012) agreed that R. olseni is extremely similar to R. callenderi, however they found that Pekinosaurus teeth have slightly different proportions and outline than R. callenderi. They provided a differential diagnosis for that species and referred it to Revueltosaurus, under the new combination R. olseni.

== Classification ==
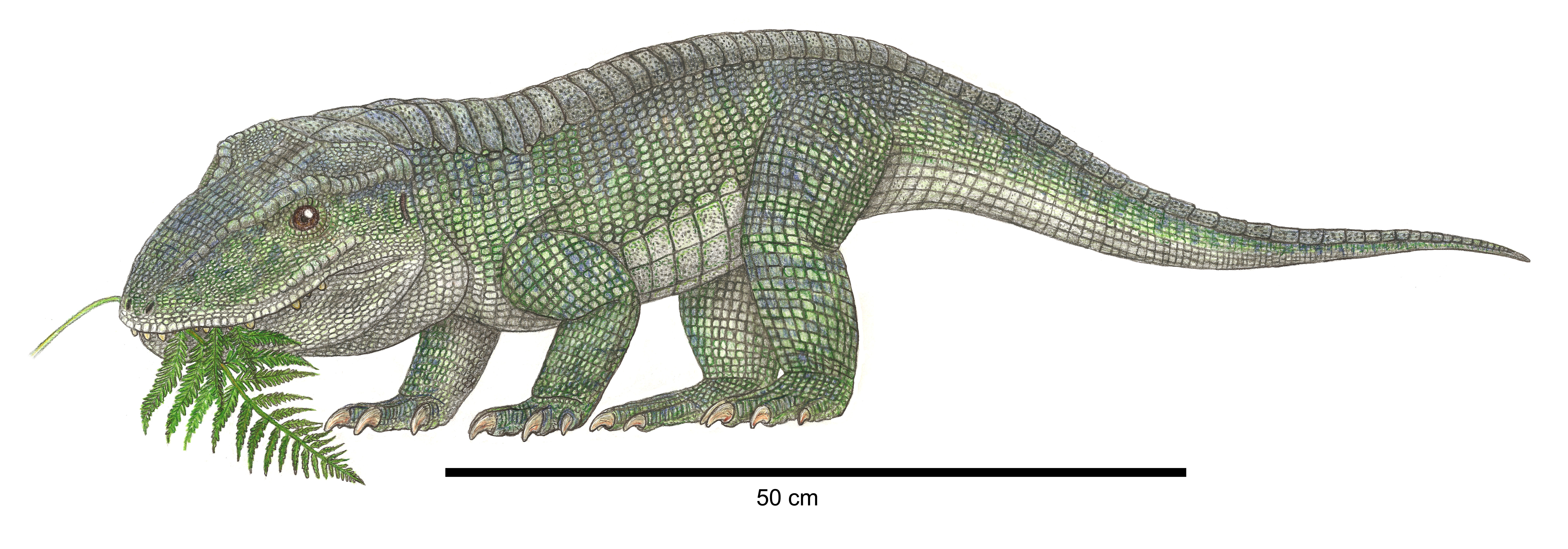
Restoration

All species of Revueltosaurus were thought to represent monospecific genera of basal ornithischian dinosaurs based on their teeth. New discoveries of skeletal material of R. callenderi have suggested that Revueltosaurus is a pseudosuchian. According to William Parker, "we have pretty much erased the record of Triassic ornithischian dinosaurs from North America, Europe and worldwide, except for South America." His co-author Randall Irmis said, "because the teeth look like those we know from herbivorous ornithischians, people assigned them to the dinosaurs. We think we've shown that you can't rely on the dentition to determine what is an early dinosaur, which casts doubt on all the ornithischians from the Triassic of North America". Nearly complete specimens of R. callenderi were tested in a broad phylogenetic analysis of basal archosaurs for the first time when Sterling J. Nesbitt included the specimens PEFO 34561 and PEFO 34269 (a complete and a nearly complete skeleton, respectively) in his 2011 phylogenetic analysis. Revueltosaurus was placed at the base of the clade Suchia as the sister taxon to the armored and herbivorous aetosaurs. However, Revueltosaurus itself is not an aetosaur, since Aetosauria was redefined to exclude it. The analysis found Gracilisuchus, Turfanosuchus and the Revueltosaurus+Aetosauria clade to nest in a large polytomy with Ticinosuchus+Paracrocodylomorpha. The cladogram below follows Nesbitt (2011).

- Archosauria
  - Avemetatarsalia
  - Pseudosuchia
    - Ornithosuchidae
    - Suchia
      - Gracilisuchus
      - Turfanosuchus
      - - Revueltosaurus
        - Aetosauria
          - Aetosaurus
          - - Longosuchus
            - Stagonolepis
      - - Ticinosuchus
        - Paracrocodylomorpha
          - Poposauroidea
          - - Prestosuchus
            - - Saurosuchus
              - - Batrachotomus
                - - Fasolasuchus
                  - - - Rauisuchus
                      - - Polonosuchus
                        - Postosuchus
                    - Crocodylomorpha
