= Eocambrian =

Eocambrian is a loosely used, imprecisely defined term referring to the latest (youngest) portion of time in the Precambrian Eon or to the uppermost Precambrian sediments which were continuously deposited across the Precambrian–Cambrian time boundary.

While the term had some usage in older literature, it does not appear on the official International Commission on Stratigraphy (ICS) time scale nor in the American Geosciences Institute (AGI) Glossary of Geology.
