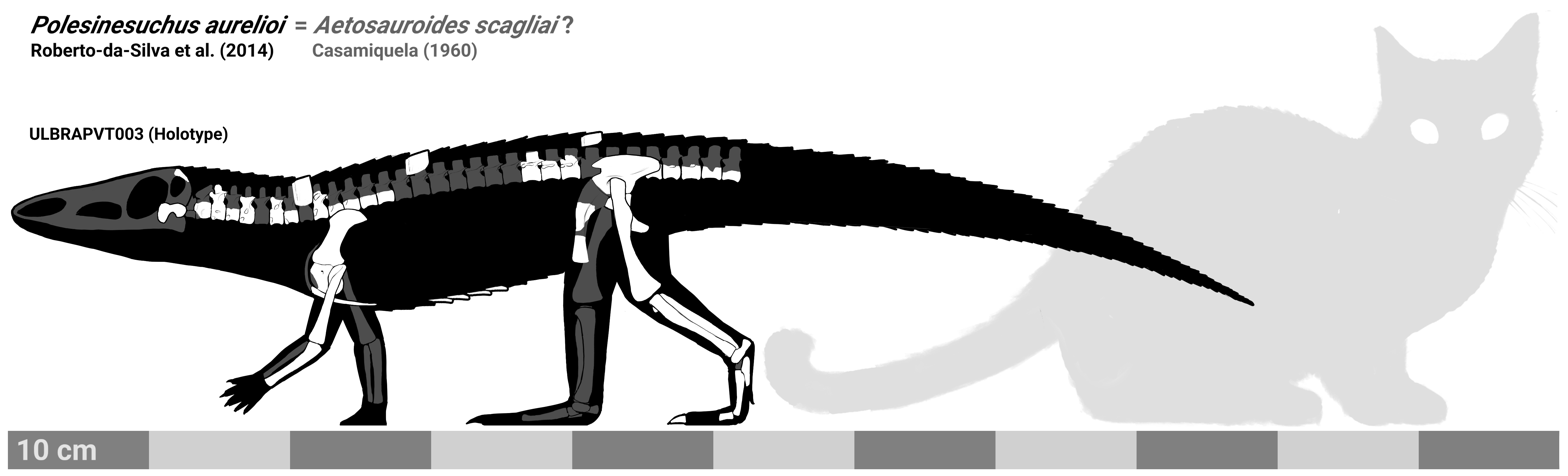
- Skeletal diagram of the holotype of Polesinesuchus

Scientific classification
- Kingdom: Animalia
- Phylum: Chordata
- Class: Reptilia
- Clade: Archosauria
- Clade: Pseudosuchia
- Order: †Aetosauria
- Family: †Stagonolepididae
- Genus: †Polesinesuchus; Roberto-da-Silva et al. 2014

Type species
- †Polesinesuchus aurelioi Roberto-da-Silva et al. 2014

= Polesinesuchus =

Polesinesuchus Temporal range: Late Triassic ~231.4–225.9 Ma

Extinct genus of reptiles

Polesinesuchus is an extinct genus of stagonolepidid aetosaur known from the Late Triassic of southern Brazil. Fossils have been found from the Santa Maria Supersequence of the late Carnian and early Norian stages, making Polesinesuchus one of the oldest aetosaurs. It contains a single species, Polesinesuchus aurelioi, the fifth aetosaur species known from South America to date. Anatomical evidence suggests that Polesinesuchus likely represents a juvenile individual of the contemporary Aetosauroides.

== Discovery ==
Polesinesuchus was first named by Lúcio Roberto-da-Silva, Julia B. Desojo, Sérgio F. Cabreira, Alex S. S. Aires, Rodrigo T. Müller, Cristian P. Pacheco and Sérgio Dias-da-Silva in 2014 and the type species is Polesinesuchus aurelioi. It is known solely from its holotype specimen, a partially articulated partial skeleton. It is composed of the parietal bone and the braincase as well as postcranial elements including cervical, dorsal, sacral and caudal vertebrae, both scapulae, a humerus, the ilium, pubis, ischium and tibia, a partial right pes, and anterior and mid-dorsal paramedian osteoderms. It was collected from the Santa Maria Formation which dates back to the late Carnian and earliest Norian stages of the Late Triassic.

== Description ==
Polesinesuchus is known from a relatively small-sized individual with an estimated length of 76 centimetres (30 in), probably a two-year-old juvenile based on the incomplete fusion of neural arches to their centra in the whole vertebral column. Polesinesuchus can be distinguished from all other aetosaurs by a unique combination of characters not controlled by ontogeny, most of which are found in its vertebrae. Its cervical vertebrae show prezygapophyses that widely extend laterally through most of the anterior edge of the diapophyses. In Polesinesuchus, hyposphene articulations are absent in both cervical and mid-dorsal vertebrae. A ventral keel is present in the cervical vertebrae. The centra of the anterior and mid-dorsal vertebrae lack a lateral fossa. The proximal end of the scapula is greatly expanded, while the medial portion of scapular blade is expanded anteroposteriorly. Polesinesuchus possess a short humerus with a robust shaft, and a dorsoventral and very low iliac blade with a long anterior process, exceeding slightly the pubic peduncle. Yet, in 2021, it was found that many of these features fall within the range of variation present in juvenile specimens of Aetosauroides. One example is the lateral fossa, which becomes more apparent in individuals of Aetosauroides longer than 1 metre (3 ft 3 in)). Furthermore, a braincase of Aetosauroides had a remarkably similar structure of the basioccipital bone to Polesinesuchus. For these reasons, Polesinesuchus was suggested as a junior synonym of Aetosauroides.

== Classification ==
A phylogenetic analysis was conducted in the first description of Polesinesuchus based on a slightly updated data matrix from previous analyses, resulting in a matrix that includes 19 aetosaurs and two outgroup taxa which are scored based on 37 morphological traits. Polesinesuchus was recovered as the sister taxon of Aetobarbakinoides, known from the same geological formation. Close relatives of this clade included Aetosauroides and Neoaetosauroides, both of which are also from South America. However, Aetosaurinae is found to be paraphyletic representing a grade of early aetosaurs that developed into desmatosuchines and typothoracisines later in the Triassic. Although this clade is placed in a relatively basal phylogenetic position among stagonolepidid aetosaurs, it is closely related to both desmatosuchines and typothoracisines, two derived clades of stagonolepidids. Below is a cladogram modified from this analysis.

- Aetosauria
  - Aetosauroides scagliai
  - Stagonolepididae
    - Aetosaurus ferratus
    - Coahomasuchus kahleorum
    - Neoaetosauroides engaeus
    - - Calyptosuchus wellesi
      - Stagonolepis robertsoni
      - - - Aetobarbakinoides brasiliensis
          - Polesinesuchus aurelioi
        - - Typothoracisinae
            - - Typothorax
              - Redondasuchus
            - Paratypothoracisini
              - Tecovasuchus chatterjeei
              - - Rioarribasuchus chamaensis
                - Paratypothorax andressorum
          - Desmatosuchinae
            - Sierritasuchus macalpini
            - - Longosuchus meadei
              - - Lucasuchus hunti
                - - Acaenasuchus geoffreyi
                  - Desmatosuchus
                    - Desmatosuchus haplocerus
                    - Desmatosuchus smalli

== See also ==
- Buriolestes
- Ixalerpeton
