= Gorgetosuchus =

Gorgetosuchus Temporal range: Late Triassic

Scientific classification
- Kingdom: Animalia
- Phylum: Chordata
- Class: Reptilia
- Clade: Archosauria
- Clade: Pseudosuchia
- Order: †Aetosauria
- Family: †Stagonolepididae
- Subfamily: †Desmatosuchinae
- Genus: †Gorgetosuchus; Heckert et al., 2015

Type species
- †Gorgetosuchus pekinensis Heckert et al., 2015

Extinct genus of reptiles

Gorgetosuchus is an extinct genus of aetosaur from the Late Triassic of the North Carolina, represented by the type species Gorgetosuchus pekinensis. It is mainly known from osteoderms, including the front half of an articulated carapace. Gorgotesuchus is typically considered a basal desmatosuchin, though alternative interpretations exist.

== Discovery ==
G. pekinensis was named and described by Heckert et al. (2015) on the basis of ten rows of bony plates called osteoderms, representing the front part of an armored carapace that would have covered the back of the animal. These plates were found embedded in sandstone and conglomerate boulders near a brick quarry in Chatham County, North Carolina, which likely originated from the Late Triassic Pekin Formation. (The Pekin Formation consists of interbedded red mudstones, siltstones, sandstones and conglomerates; it was the fine-grained mudstones and siltstones that the mining operation was targeting for brick-making, so coarser-grained blocks were removed from the pit). Gorgetosuchus was part of a diverse faunal community in a continental rift valley system during the Late Triassic, which also included traversodontids, phytosaurs, dicynodonts, and temnospondyls. Gorgetosuchus coexisted with two other aetosaurs, Lucasuchus and Coahomasuchus.

== Description ==
Gorgetosuchus is unique among aetosaurs in having cervical (neck) osteoderms that nearly wrap around the entire neck and are strongly angled to give the neck a hexagonal shape in cross-section. The lateral (side) and paramedian (upper) osteoderms each bear prominent spines. Other aetosaurs such as Longosuchus also have neck spines, but only on the lateral osteoderms. The cervical osteoderms are wider than they are long, a feature that unites Gorgetosuchus with basal "aetosaurine" aetosaurs. However, several features of the osteoderms (such as a flange on the lateral cervical osteoderms that overlaps the paramedian osteoderms) link it with the desmatosuchines, a more derived group of aetosaurs.

== Classification ==
Among aetosaurs, Gorgetosuchus closely resembles Lucasuchus and Longosuchus, both of which are desmatosuchines. A phylogenetic analysis conducted by Heckert et al. (2015) placed Gorgetosuchus close to these taxa as the most basal desmatosuchine, but the results were not statistically well supported. Below is a strict consensus tree from their analysis showing the placement of Gorgetosuchus:

- - Postosuchus
  - - Revueltosaurus
    - - Aetosauria
        - Aetosauroides
        - Stagonolepididae
          - Coahomasuchus
          - - Aetosaurus
            - - Neoaetosauroides
              - - Stagonolepis
                - - Calyptosuchus
                  - - Redondasuchus
                    - - Typothoracisinae
                        - Typothorax
                        - - Tecovasuchus
                          - - Paratypothorax
                            - Rioarribasuchus
                      - Desmatosuchinae
                        - Gorgetosuchus
                        - - Longosuchus
                          - - Sierritasuchus
                            - - Acaenasuchus
                              - - Lucasuchus
                                - Desmatosuchus

Gorgetosuchus was also placed as the basal-most member of Desmatosuchini (traditional desmatosuchines) in an analysis by Parker (2016). However, an analysis by Hoffman et al. (2018), based on an earlier analysis by Schoch & Desojo (2016), placed it within Typothoracinae, closely related to Typothorax and Redondasuchus. Typothoracines and desmatosuchins are known to have a large degree of homoplasy (convergent evolution) in certain osteoderm traits observed in Gorgetosuchus. On the other hand, other skeletal traits strongly diverge between the two groups, so the position of Gorgetosuchus would likely stabilize if more non-osteoderm bones were discovered.
