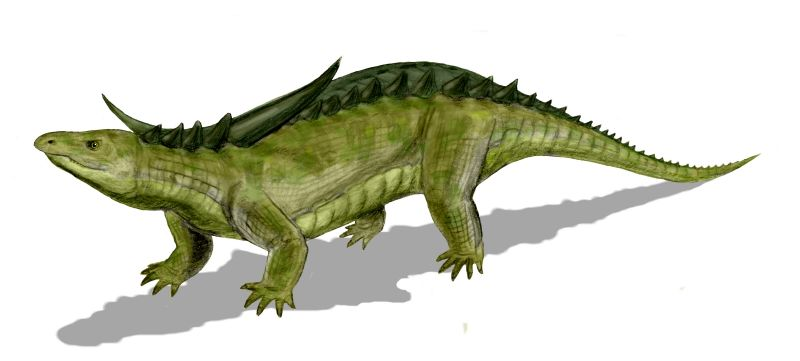
- Desmatosuchus

Scientific classification
- Kingdom: Animalia
- Phylum: Chordata
- Class: Reptilia
- Clade: Pseudosuchia
- Order: †Aetosauria
- Family: †Stagonolepididae
- Subfamily: †Desmatosuchinae; Huene 1942 sensu Heckert and Lucas, 2000

Genera
- †Adamanasuchus?; †Aetobarbakinoides?; †Calyptosuchus?; †Chilenosuchus?; †Neoaetosauroides?; †Olkasuchus; †Scutarx?; †Desmatosuchini Parker, 2016; †Desmatosuchus; †Gorgetosuchus?; †Longosuchus; †Lucasuchus; †Sierritasuchus

= Desmatosuchinae =

Desmatosuchinae Temporal range: Late Triassic

Subfamily of reptiles

Desmatosuchinae is a major subfamily of aetosaurs within the clade Desmatosuchia. It is a stem-based taxon defined as all aetosaurs more closely related to Desmatosuchus than to Stagonolepis, Aetosaurus, or Paratypothorax.

The clade Desmatosuchinae has often been restricted to a few closely related aetosaurs with spiny armor, such as Desmatosuchus, Longosuchus, and Lucasuchus. It was later expanded to include a number of Stagonolepis-like aetosaurs with less specialized armor. Under this more expansive usage, the strongly-supported clade encompassing "traditional" desmatosuchines (sensu stricto) was given a new name, Desmatosuchini. Synapomorphies that diagnose this clade can be found in the osteoderms. These include tongue-and-groove articulations for lateral plates present in dorsal presacral paramedian plates and large spikes on the lateral cervical, dorsal, and caudal plates.
