= Aetobarbakinoides =

Aetobarbakinoides Temporal range: Late Triassic, 231.4–225.9 Ma

Scientific classification
- Domain: Eukaryota
- Kingdom: Animalia
- Phylum: Chordata
- Class: Reptilia
- Clade: Archosauria
- Clade: Pseudosuchia
- Order: †Aetosauria
- Family: †Stagonolepididae
- Genus: †Aetobarbakinoides; Desojo et al., 2012

Type species
- †Aetobarbakinoides brasiliensis Desojo et al., 2012

Extinct genus of reptiles

Aetobarbakinoides is an extinct genus of stagonolepidid aetosaur known from the Late Triassic of Rio Grande do Sul state, southern Brazil. Fossils have been found from the Santa Maria Supersequence of the late Carnian and early Norian stages, making Aetobarbakinoides one of the oldest aetosaurs. The type species, A. brasiliensis, was named in 2012, and is notable for being described primarily by features of the vertebrae; most other aetosaurs are diagnosed by features in bony plates called osteoderms, which are by far the most common material. Although placed in a basal phylogenetic position among aetosaurs, Aetobarbakinoides is closely related to both desmatosuchines and typothoracisines, two derived clades of aetosaurs.

== Discovery ==
Aetobarbakinoides is known only from the holotype specimen CPE2 168, a partially articulated partial postcranial skeleton which is housed at the Coleção Municipal in São Pedro do Sul. It was found near the city of São Pedro do Sul, in the center of Rio Grande do Sul, Brazil. It was collected in the Inhamandá locality, from the Hyperodapedon Assemblage Zone, Sequence 2 of the Santa Maria Supersequence (formerly known as Santa Maria Formation) which dates back to the late Carnian and earliest Norian stages of the Late Triassic. CPE2 168 was assigned by Lucas & Heckert (2001) to Stagonolepis robertsoni. It is the first aetosaur to be diagnosed in its original description without osteoderms, the most common material associated with these reptiles. Along with the genus Aetosauroides from Argentina and Brazil and Stagonolepis robertsoni from Scotland, Aetobarbakinoides is among the oldest aetosaurs. Its presence in South America indicates that aetosaurs had a wide geographic distribution early in their history. Aetobarbakinoides is most closely related to Aetosauroides and Neoaetosauroides. Features of its osteoderms suggest a close relationship with aetosaurines, but its vertebrae are more similar to desmatosuchines.

== Description ==
Aetobarbakinoides is known from neck and back vertebrae, ribs, and several limb bones including the scapula, humerus, tibia, and foot bones. Paramedian osteoderms overlying the midline of the back and neck are also known. Most of the distinguishing features of Aetobarbakinoides are found in its vertebrae. Laterally-oriented projections on the neck vertebrae called prezygapophyses are longer and wider than those of many other aetosaurs. In contrast, the prezygapophyses of the vertebrae at the base of the tail are very thin. The humerus and tibia are large relative to the axial skeleton. The vertebrae of Aetobarbakinoides are more similar to those of Desmatosuchus than they are to its closest relatives, Aetosauroides and Neoaetosaurioides. Aetobarbakinoides is a medium-sized aetosaur, it has been estimated to have been about 2 m (6.6 ft) in total length.

== Classification ==
A phylogenetic analysis was conducted in the first description of Aetobarbakinoides. Close relatives included Aetosauroides and Neoaetosauroides, both of which are from South America. Aetobarbakinoides was found to be most closely related to a clade including Desmatosuchinae and Typothoracisinae. In most studies, Typothoracisinae is placed in the subfamily Aetosaurinae, while Desmatosuchinae makes up its own subfamily of aetosaurs. This study suggests that Aetosaurinae is paraphyletic, and that aetosaurines represent a grade of early aetosaurs that developed into desmatosuchines and typothoracisines later in the Triassic. The following cladogram simplified after an analysis presented by Julia B. Desojo, Martin D. Ezcurra and Edio E. Kischlat (2012).

- Aetosauria
  - Aetosauroides
  - Stagonolepididae
    - Aetosaurus
    - Coahomasuchus
    - - Neoaetosauroides
      - - Calyptosuchus
        - Stagonolepis
        - - Aetobarbakinoides
          - - Desmatosuchinae
            - Typothoracisinae

== Etymology ==
Aetobarbakinoides was first named by Julia B. Desojo, Martin D. Ezcurra and Edio E. Kischlat in 2012 and the type species is Aetobarbakinoides brasiliensis. The generic name is derived from Greek aetobarbakina meaning "long-legged buzzard" (the common name of Buteo rufinus) and from Latin oides meaning "form". It refers to its elongated humerus and tibia and the close relation to the "eagle reptile", Aetosaurus. The specific name refers to Brazil, the country in which the holotype was found.
