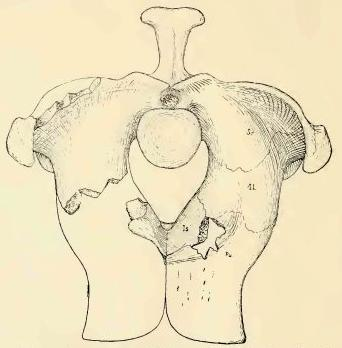
- Pelvis of Acompsosaurus wingatensis (anterior view)

Scientific classification
- Kingdom: Animalia
- Phylum: Chordata
- Class: Reptilia
- Clade: Archosauria
- Clade: Pseudosuchia
- Order: †Aetosauria
- Family: †Stagonolepididae
- Genus: †Acompsosaurus; Mehl, 1916

Species
- †A. wingatensis Mehl, 1916 (type)

= Acompsosaurus =

Acompsosaurus Temporal range: Late Triassic

Extinct genus of reptiles

Acompsosaurus is an extinct genus of aetosaur that lived during the Late Triassic period. It is known from a partial skeleton found from the Petrified Forest Member of the Chinle Formation near Fort Wingate, New Mexico, which is now lost.

The generic name means "sturdy lizard." It may be a junior synonym of Stagonolepis as its pelvis closely resembles that of S. robertsoni.
