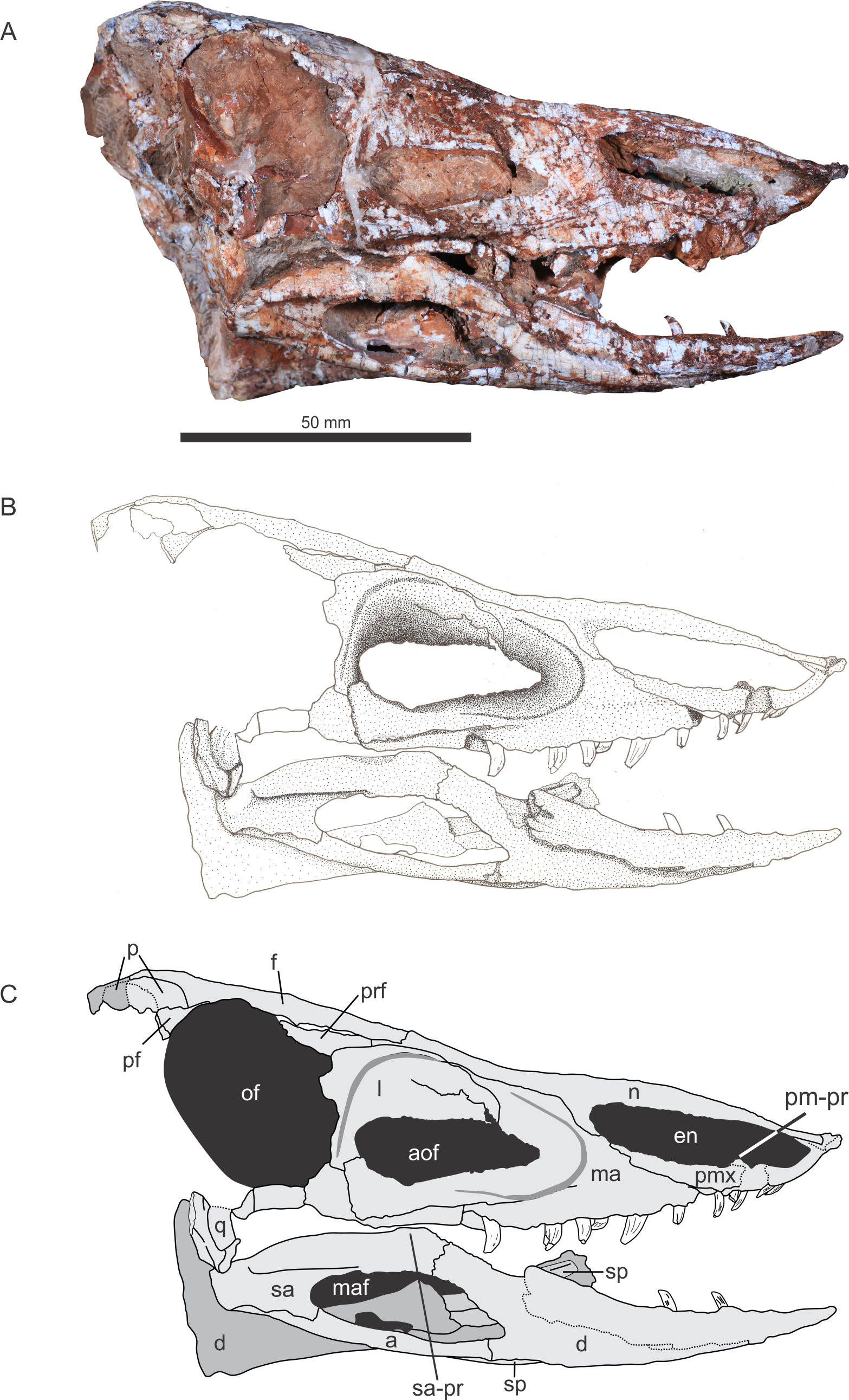
- Skull of A. scagliai

Scientific classification
- Kingdom: Animalia
- Phylum: Chordata
- Class: Reptilia
- Clade: Pseudosuchia
- Order: †Aetosauria
- Genus: †Aetosauroides; Casamiquela, 1960

Type species
- †Aetosauroides scagliai Casamiquela, 1960

Synonyms
- A. subsulcatus Zacarias, 1982; A. inhamandensis Barberena et al., 1985; Polesinesuchus aurelioi? Roberto-da-Silva et al., 2014

= Aetosauroides =

Aetosauroides Temporal range: Late Triassic ~231.4–225.9 Ma

Extinct genus of reptiles

Aetosauroides (meaning "Aetosaurus-like") is an extinct genus of aetosaur from the Late Triassic of South America. It is one of four aetosaurs known from South America, the others being Neoaetosauroides, Chilenosuchus and Aetobarbakinoides. Three species have been named: the type species A. scagliai, A. subsulcatus, and A. inhamandensis. Fossils have been found in the Cancha de Bochas Member of the Ischigualasto Formation in the Ischigualasto-Villa Unión Basin in northwestern Argentina and the Santa Maria Formation in the Paraná Basin in southeastern Brazil. The strata date to the late Carnian and early Norian stages, making Aetosauroides one of the oldest aetosaurs.

== Description ==
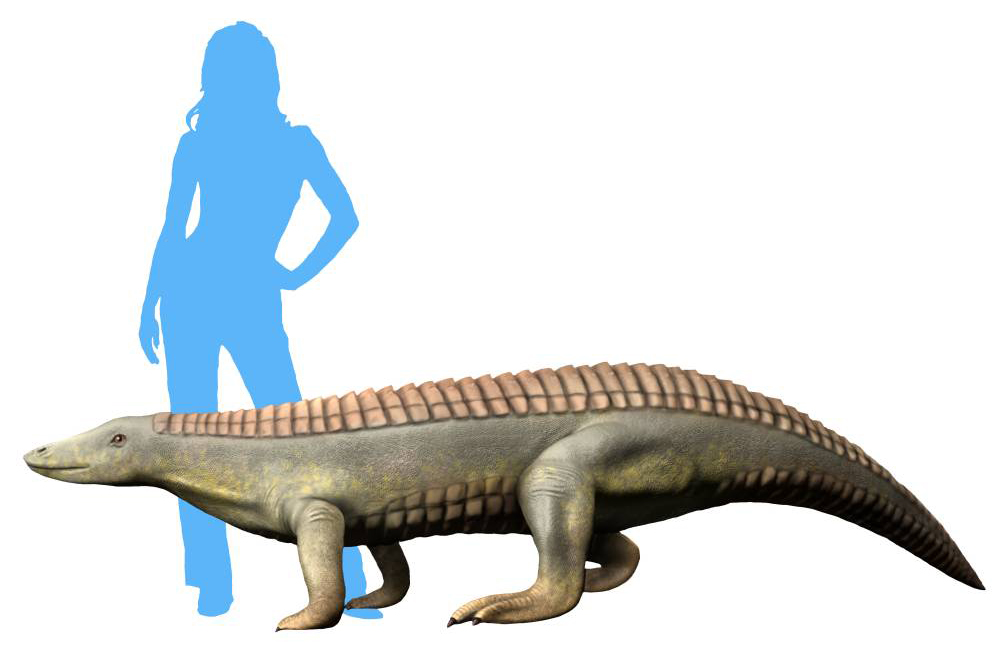
Restoration of A. scagliai

Most individuals of Aetosauroides measured around 1.3 metres (4 ft 3 in) in length, with one large individual reaching 2.4 metres (7 ft 10 in) (with histology suggesting an age of 23 years). Sexual maturity was probably reached at 1 metre (3 ft 3 in) in length, although these individuals were not yet fully grown. Sexual dimorphism has been suggested for Aetosauroides, with males reaching the 2-metre (6 ft 7 in) size range. The premaxilla's shovel-shaped tip in A. scagliai lacked the same prominence as the lateral expansion found in desmatosuchines.

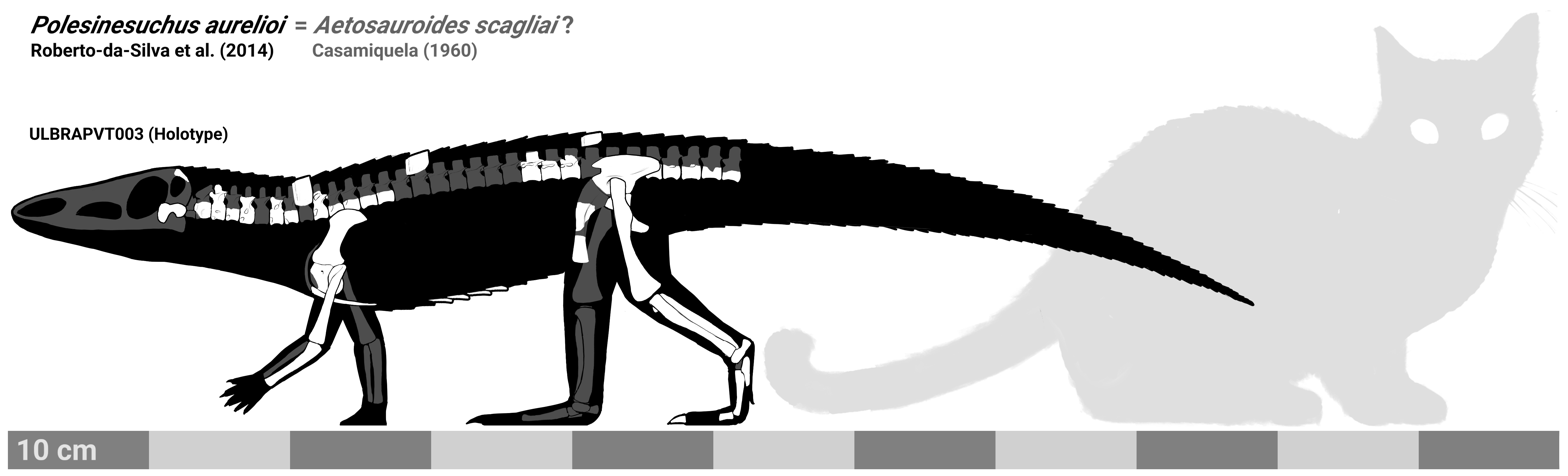
Skeletal diagram of the holotype of Polesinesuchus aureloi, a possible synonym of Aetosauroides scagliai

Aetosauroides was proposed to be synonymous with the genus Stagonolepis in 1996 and 2002. Smaller specimens of both species were placed with Stagonolepis robertsoni, and larger specimens were considered to be S. wellesi. This synonymy is not accepted, with several studies identifying unique features that distinguish Aetosauroides from Stagonolepis. Among these are maxillae that do not touch the nostrils, oval-shaped holes on the centra of the vertebrae, and a convex margin of the lower jaw. In a 2011 study, A. subsulcatus and A. inhamandensis were proposed to be synonymous with A. scagliai. Additionally, a contemporary aetosaur named from a juvenile specimen in 2014, Polesinesuchus aurelioi, was found to be similar in its vertebrae and the basioccipital of its braincase to juvenile specimens of Aetosauroides in two 2021 studies, and it was proposed as a junior synonym of the latter.

== Classification ==
A phylogenetic analysis presented by Julia B. Desojo, Martin D. Ezcurra and Edio E. Kischlat in 2012 found that Aetosauroides lies outside Stagonolepididae. If this phylogeny is correct, Stagonolepididae and Aetosauria would not be equivalent groupings, and Aetosauroides would be the first non-stagonolepidid aetosaur.

== Palaeobiology ==
=== Palaeoecology ===
Although A. scagliai had recurved ziphodont teeth typical of carnivores, its shovel-shaped snout and its edentulous anterior premaxilla and dentary suggest that it was omnivorous.

=== Palaeopathology ===
A palaeopathological specimen of A. scagliai has been found, consisting of a distal fragment of a fibula containing radial fibrolamellar bone indicative of periostitis. This palaeopathology is believed to have been caused by some sort of non-traumatic stress followed by a pyogenic infection.
