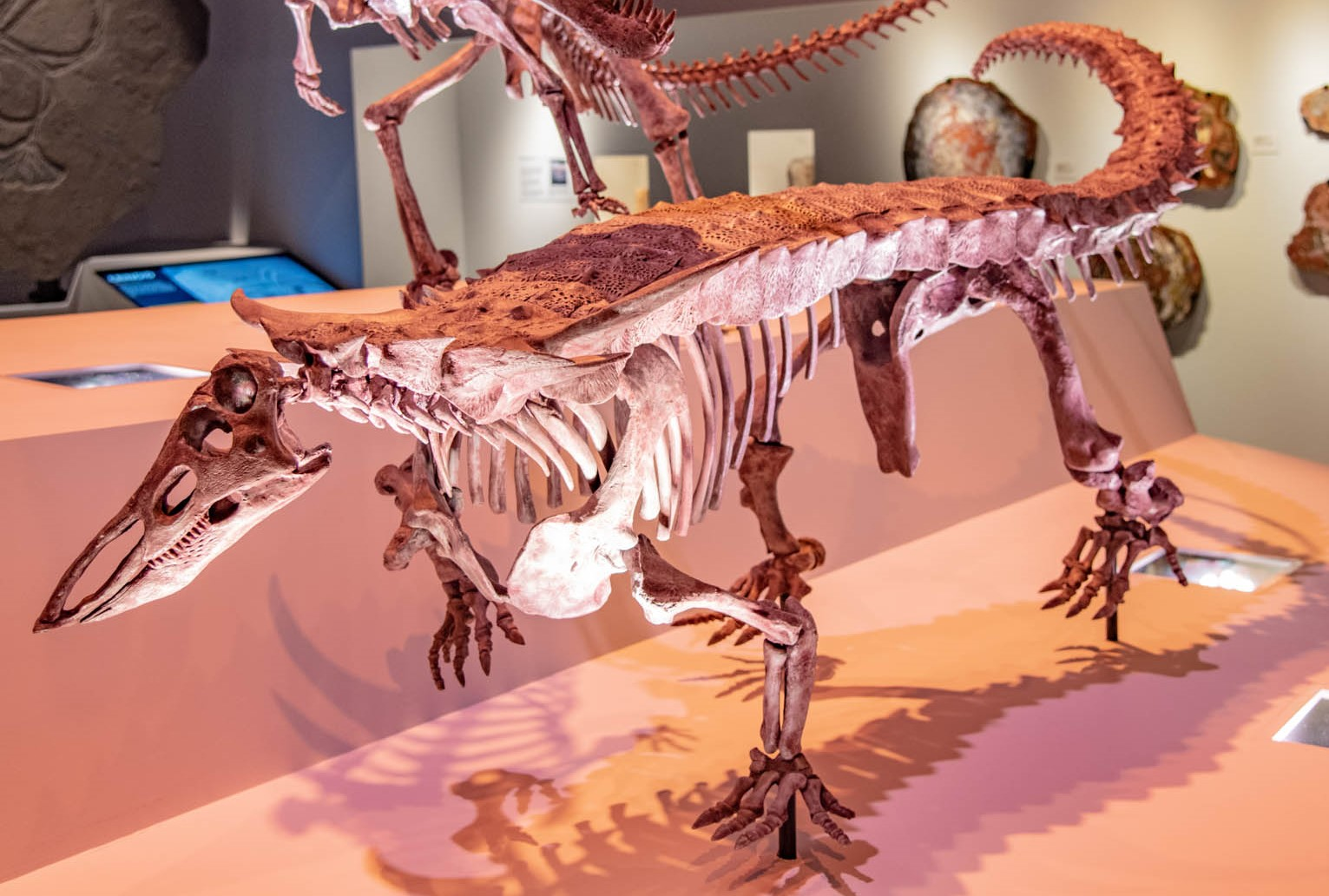
- Skeletal mount of Desmatosuchus

Scientific classification
- Kingdom: Animalia
- Phylum: Chordata
- Class: Reptilia
- Clade: Pseudosuchia
- Clade: †Aetosauriformes
- Order: †Aetosauria; Lydekker, 1887

Subgroups
- †Aetosauroides; †Stagonolepididae Lydekker, 1887 sensu Heckert & Lucas, 2000; †Aetosaurinae; †Stagonolepidoidea / Desmatosuchia Case, 1920 sensu Parker, 2016; †Desmatosuchinae; †Stagonolepidinae Lydekker, 1887 sensu Heckert & Lucas, 2000; †Calyptosuchus?; †Polesinesuchus; †Stagonolepis

= Aetosauria =

Aetosaurs Temporal range: Late Triassic, 231.4–201.4 Ma

Extinct order of heavily armoured reptiles

Aetosaurs (/eɪˌɛtoʊˈsɔːr/) are heavily armored reptiles belonging to the extinct order Aetosauria (/eɪˌɛtoʊˈsɔːriə/; from Greek, ἀετός (aetos, "eagle") and σαυρος (sauros, "lizard")). They were medium- to large-sized omnivorous or herbivorous pseudosuchians, part of the branch of archosaurs more closely related to crocodilians than to birds and non-avian dinosaurs. All known aetosaurs are restricted to the Late Triassic, and in some strata from this time they are among the most abundant fossil vertebrates. They have small heads, upturned snouts, erect limbs, and a body ornamented with four rows of plate-like osteoderms (bony scutes). Aetosaur fossil remains are known from Europe, North and South America, parts of Africa, and India. Since their armoured plates are often preserved and are abundant in certain localities, aetosaurs serve as important Late Triassic tetrapod index fossils. Many aetosaurs had wide geographic ranges, but their stratigraphic ranges were relatively short. Therefore, the presence of particular aetosaurs can accurately date a site in which they are found.

Nearly all aetosaurs (except for the genus Aetosauroides) belong to the family Stagonolepididae. Over 20 genera of aetosaurs have been described, and recently there has been controversy regarding the description of some of these genera. Two distinct subdivisions of aetosaurs are currently recognized, Desmatosuchia and Aetosaurinae, based primarily on broad differences in skull morphology. Osteoderms structure is generally one of the most useful traits for inferring aetosaur relations more precisely. Among other archosaurs, aetosaurs are most closely related to Revueltosaurus, a small reptile originally known from teeth mistakenly referred to herbivorous dinosaurs.

Aetosaur remains were first discovered in the early 19th century, although the first remains that were described were mistaken for fish scales. Aetosaurs were later recognized as crocodile relatives, at which point they were interpreted as semiaquatic scavengers closely related to phytosaurs. Subsequent work has established that aetosaurs were entirely terrestrial animals, and were likely herbivorous to some extent. Some forms have characteristics that may have been adaptations to digging for food. Supposed nesting structures have also been referred to aetosaurs, but this connection is considered ambiguous.

== Description ==
=== Skull anatomy ===
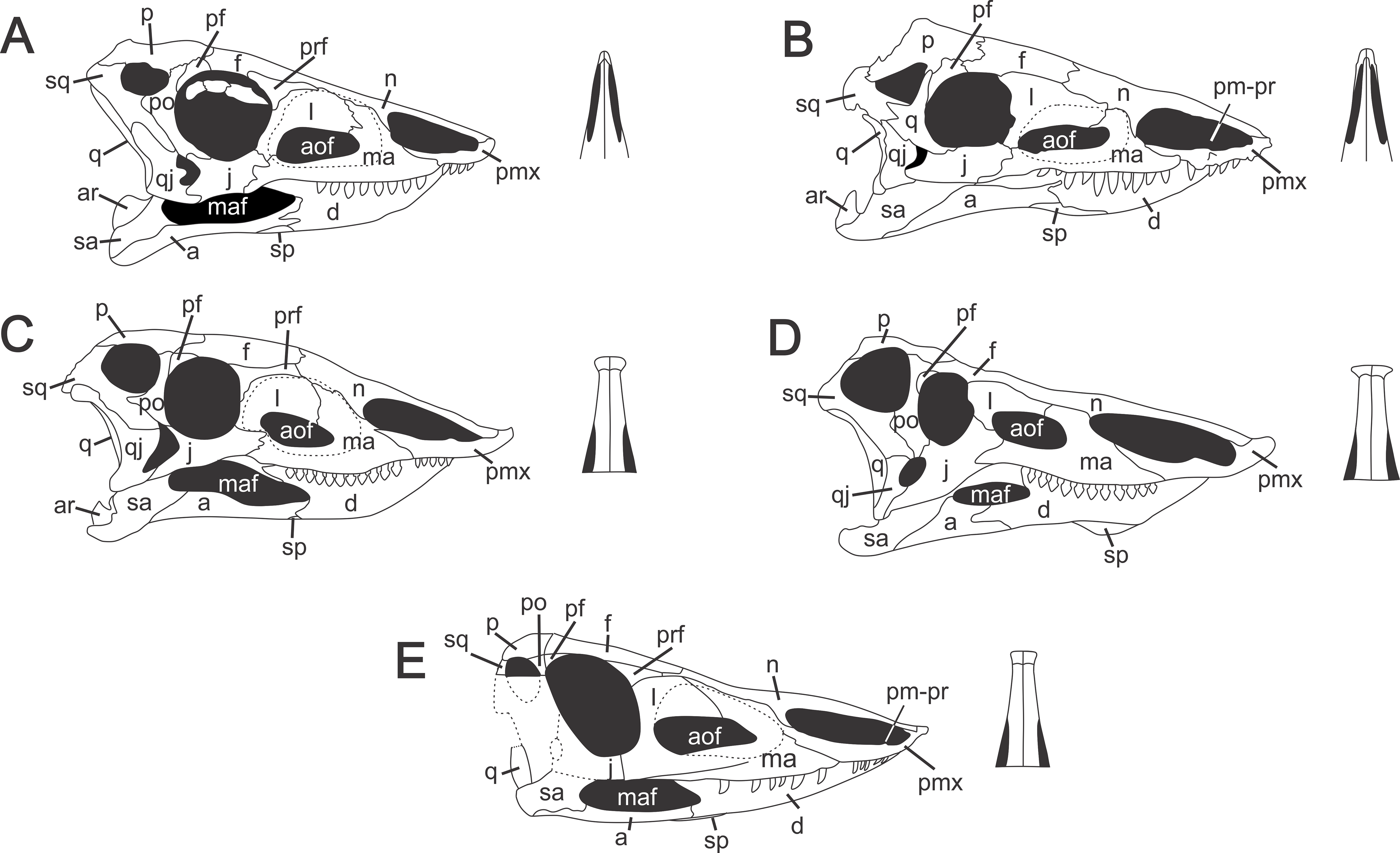
Aetosaur skull reconstructions: (A) Aetosaurus ferratus, (B) Paratypothorax andressorum, (C) Stagonolepis robertsoni, (D) Desmatosuchus smalli, (E) Aetosauroides scagliai

The skull of aetosaurs is relatively small compared to the body, and is quite distinctive in shape. Teeth are absent from both the front of the premaxilla (the bone forming the tip of the snout) and the front of the dentary (the toothed bone of the lower jaw). The teeth which are present are usually small and bulbous, ranging from basic conical forms to leaf-like shapes with large serrations. These are probably indicative of an omnivorous or herbivorous diet, and similar adaptations are seen in other archosaurs with less reliance on meat in their diet. A few aetosaurs have teeth with a ziphodont shape, meaning that the teeth are recurved, serrated, and flattened from the side. This shape, which is predominant in Aetosauroides and a small specimen tentatively referred to Coahomasuchus, is typical of carnivorous archosaurs.

In some aetosaurs (particular members of the group Desmatosuchia), the tip of the snout is expanded sideways into a flattened 'shovel' shape, akin to the snout of a pig. The external nares (nostril holes) are elongated, much larger than the antorbital fenestrae (a hole on the side of the skull). Many aetosaurs have a small knob on the premaxilla which projects into the nares from below. In all aetosaurs except Aetosauroides, the rear edge of the naris receives a contribution from the concave front edge of the maxilla bone. At the rear upper part of the skull, a hole known as the supratemporal fenestra is positioned and exposed on the side, unlike most other archosaurs where it is mostly visible when viewing the skull from above. The braincase is fairly standard by pseudosuchian standards, though the opening for the abducens nerve passes through the parabasisphenoid bone (at the lower front part of the braincase), rather than the prootic bone (at the upper front part). This trait is otherwise only seen in Revueltosaurus and crocodylomorphs among archosaurs. The mandible (lower jaw) is described as 'slipper'-shaped in many aetosaurs. This is due to a combination of features: the front of the dentary strongly tapers to a point, while the underside of the dentary sometimes flexes into a 'chin' (downwards projection) which may expose the splenial bone as well. The jaw joint is set at a low position, and the articular (the bone of the lower jaw which connects to the cranium) often has a tall projection right behind the jaw joint.

=== Postcranial anatomy ===
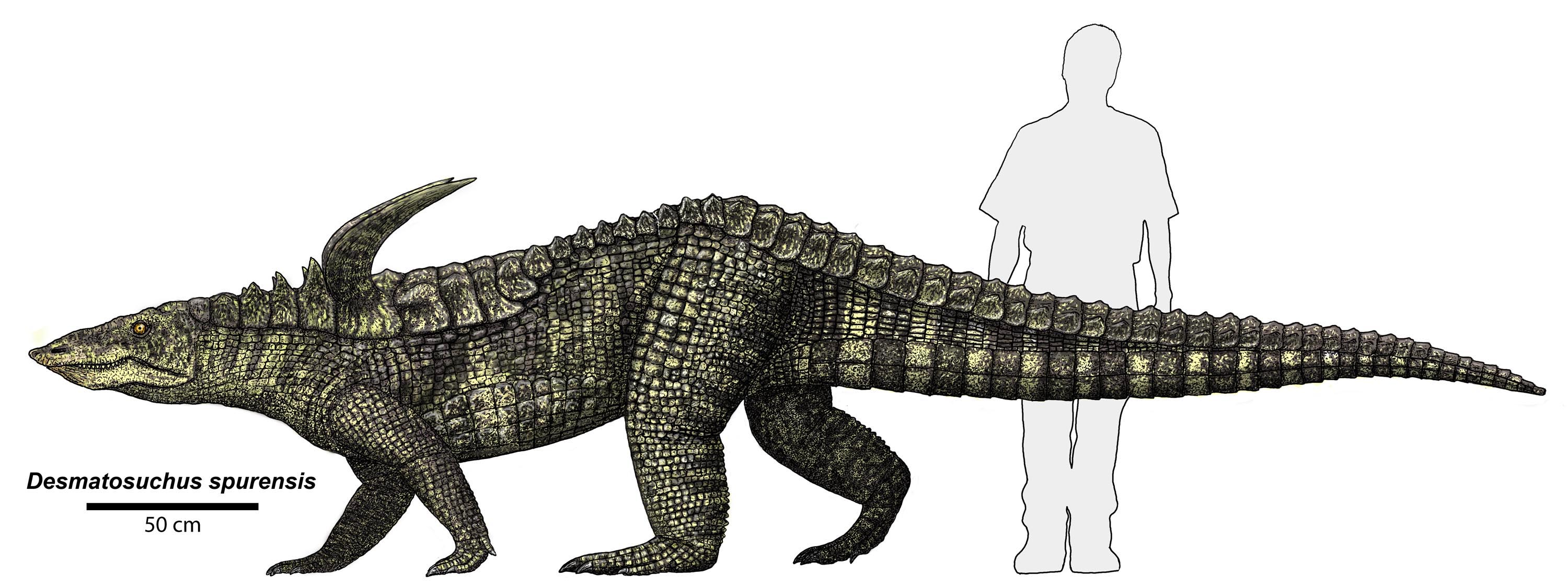
Life restoration and size diagram of Desmatosuchus spurensis

In most respects apart from their skull and armor, the skeletal anatomy of aetosaurs was fairly standard among other large Triassic pseudosuchians. The hindlimbs developed a "pillar-erect" limb posture similar to that seen in "rauisuchians", a related grade of carnivorous Triassic pseudosuchians ancestral to crocodylomorphs. A pillar-erect limb posture is one where the femur articulates vertically with the acetabulum of the hip, which is angled downward, so that the leg is positioned beneath the body and acts as a weight-bearing pillar. Nevertheless, there was likely significant variation in the hip structure of aetosaurs, and the forelimbs may have had a semi-sprawling 'hybrid' stance. While the hindlimb posture is similar to rauisuchians, other traits are more plesiomorphic (typical to ancestral pseudosuchians), such as the stout pelvis and broad, five-toed feet. The forelimbs were smaller than the hind limbs, and the radius in particular was much shorter than the humerus. Nevertheless, their low and heavy body shape requires that all aetosaurs were quadrupeds. They had multiple adaptations to strengthen the body in response to their heavy armor: the iliofibularis muscle attached to a lower position on the fibula, the fourth trochanter of the femur was enlarged, the transverse processes (rib attachments) developed into long massive pedestals, and the largest species even acquired hyposphene-hypantrum reinforcements between their vertebrae.

Although aetosaurs were generally wide-bodied reptiles, there is some variation in the degree of this trend. The typothoracines, exemplified by Typothorax and Paratypothorax, had a very broad, disc-shaped carapace, edged by small spines or keels and transitioning to a narrow tail. The largest species of typothoracines may have been around 3 meters (9.8 feet) in length and 110 kg (243 lbs) in weight. The desmatosuchines (Desmatosuchinae sensu stricto), such as Desmatosuchus and Longosuchus, had moderately narrower bodies and no belly armor. However, they also acquired spinier back armor, especially in the cervical (neck) region. Desmatosuchus was likely one of the largest known aetosaurs, at 4–6 m (13–20 ft) in length and 280 kg (620 lb) in weight. Aetosaurs which do not fit into these two categories, such as Stagonolepis and Neoaetosauroides, generally had narrow forms, slender limbs, and a restriction in the carapace above the hip. This body type is plesiomorphic (ancestral) to the other two shapes, with some narrow-bodied aetosaurs more closely related to typothoracines and others closer to desmatosuchines. Some plesiomorphic genera, like the widespread Norian genus Aetosaurus and the Carnian Coahomasuchus, tended to be small, about a metre (3.2 ft) in length. Others were larger, such as the basal-most aetosaur Aetosauroides and the early desmatosuchine Calyptosuchus.

==== Armor ====
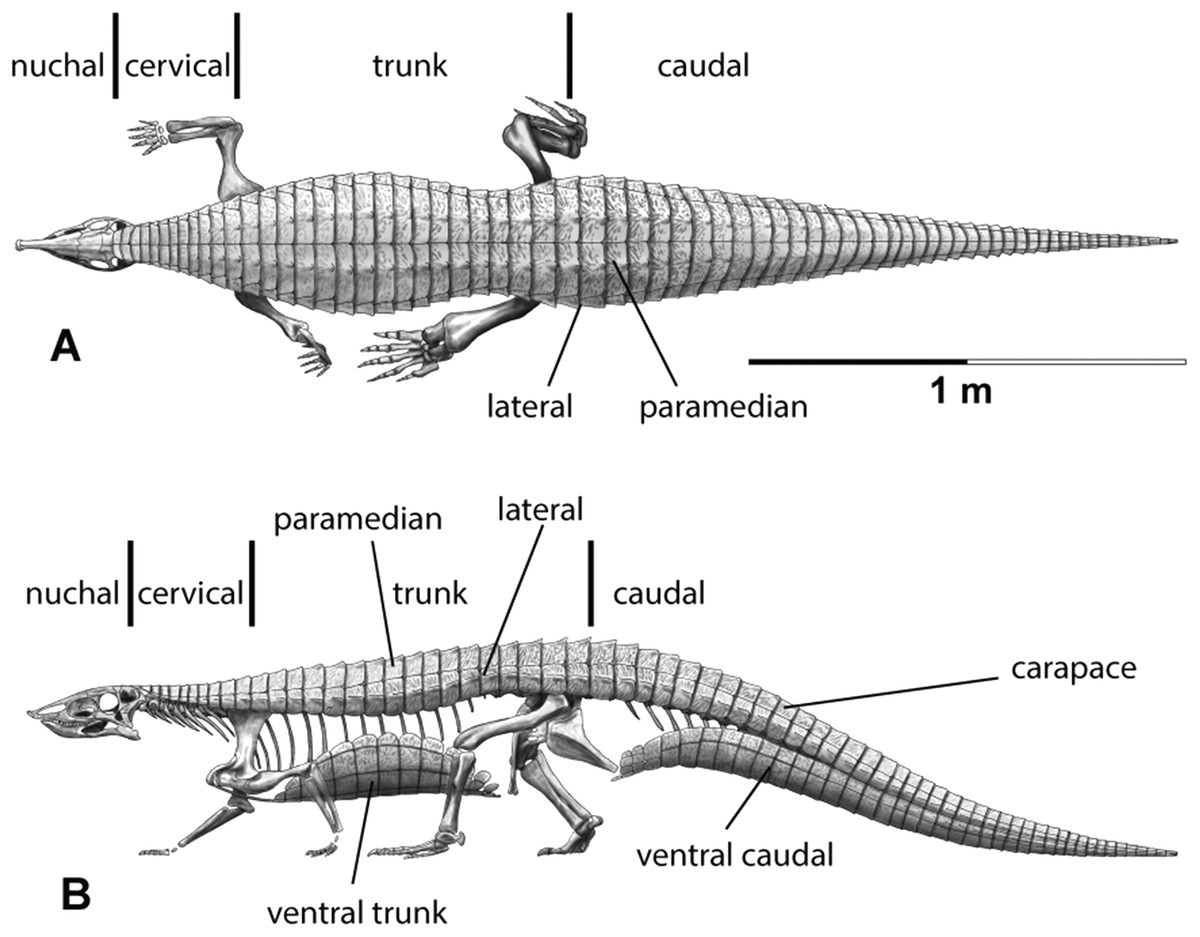
Skeletal diagram of Stagonolepis robertsoni, showing osteoderm terminology

Aetosaurs were very heavily armored, with rows of large, interlocking bony plates, known as osteoderms, protecting the back, sides, belly, and tail. These osteoderms generally have a quadrangular (four-sided) shape, and were most certainly used as a defense against predators. Most osteoderms are heavily pitted on their upper surfaces and smooth on their undersides. They have a heterogenous internal structure: the inner portion of each osteoderm is made of cancellous or spongy bone (also called diploë) and their outer portions are made up of compact bone. In life, these plates were probably covered in a keratinous (horn) covering, like modern crocodilian scutes, which are another example of pseudosuchian osteoderms. Osteoderms are useful in diagnosing aetosaur taxa, and aetosaur species can often be identified from individual scutes based on their shape, structure, or ornamentation pattern.

Aetosaurs have four rows of osteoderms running along their dorsal (back) side, forming a continuous plate often called the carapace. The inner two rows, which flank the midline of the spinal column, are known as paramedian osteoderms. These tend to be wider than long and strongly ornamented with radiating pits or grooves. Nearly all aetosaurs possess a small boss or raised surface, known as a dorsal eminence, on the upper surface of each plate. The dorsal eminence is often set posteriorly (backwards) or medially (inwards) on their respective paramedian osteoderm, though there are many exceptions within the group. The paramedian osteoderms almost always have raised or depressed anterior edges, where the plates are overlapped by the ones in front of them. If the anterior edge is raised, the area is called an anterior bar, while if it is depressed, the area is called an anterior lamina. Although two paramedian osteoderm rows are common in early archosauriforms, few reptiles approach aetosaurs in the complexity of their osteoderms. The osteoderms of doswelliids, erpetosuchids, and certain crocodylomorphs are occasionally confused or compared with those of aetosaurs. Both an anterior bar and dorsal eminence occur in Acaenasuchus, a close relative of aetosaurs originally misidentified as a juvenile desmatosuchine.

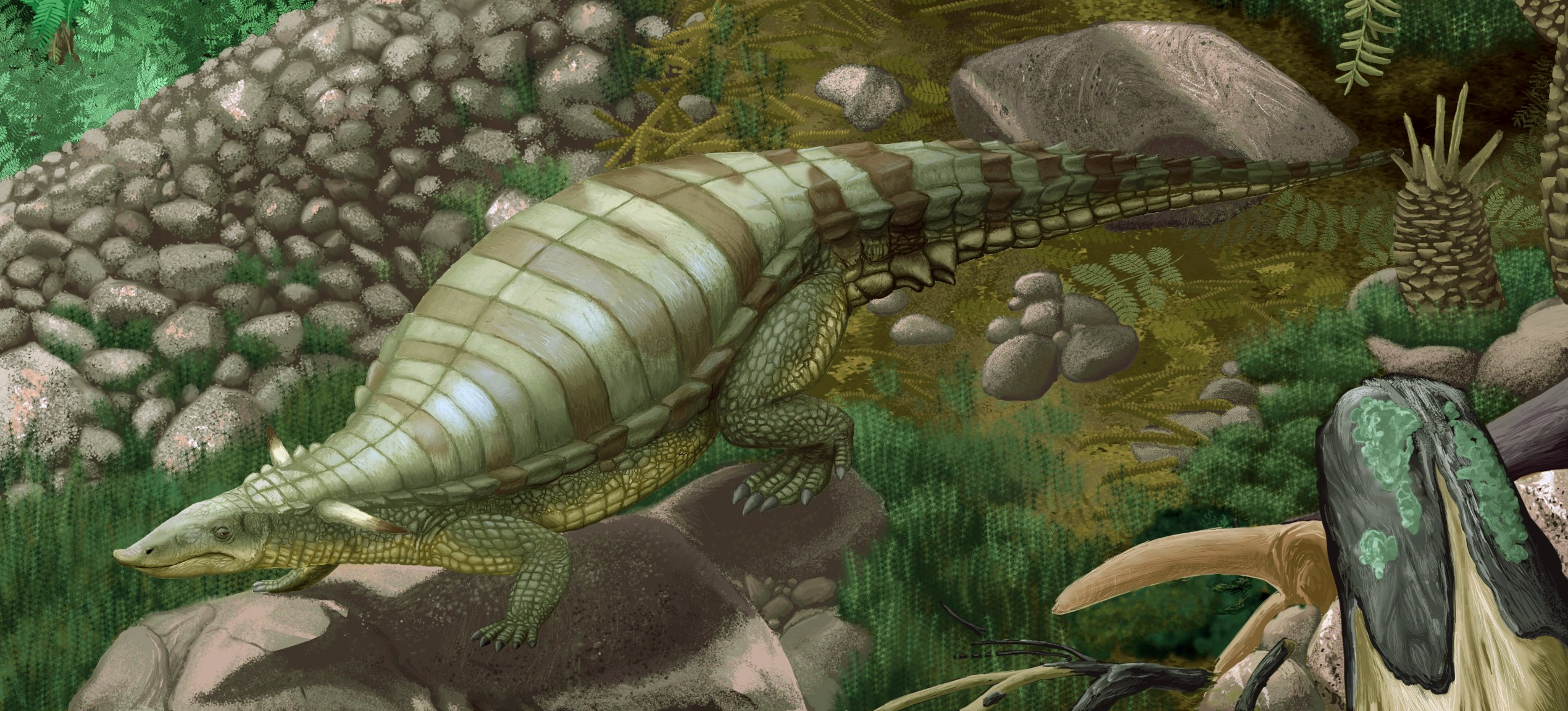
Life restoration of Typothorax coccinarum

The outer two rows of osteoderms, which lie beside the paramedians, are known as lateral osteoderms. They parallel the paramedians over nearly the entire backside, though the first two paramedians behind the head (known as nuchal osteoderms) are solitary. Lateral plates generally are separated into two surfaces, or flanges, flexed between their dorsal eminence. The upper, or dorsal flange lies in the same plane as the paramedian osteoderms. The lower/outer, or lateral flange wraps down onto the side of the body. The dorsal eminence between these flanges often has the form of a low blade, knob, or spike. In the cervical lateral osteoderms, which are positioned on the neck, the dorsal eminence tends to manifest as a prominent spike. This is taken to an extreme in desmatosuchines such as Longosuchus and Desmatosuchus, where the spike is enlarged into a sharply curved horn.

In most aetosaurs (a major exception being desmatosuchines), the underside of the animal is also protected by osteoderms. These ventral (belly) osteoderms are generally smaller and flatter than the dorsal series, and are arranged into a larger number of rows (usually 5 - 14 rows), at least in the torso. Ventral osteoderms rows usually curve outwards and separate under the hip, leaving a wide gap for the cloacal opening. Large, hooked spines occur around this opening in Typothorax, one of the few exceptions to a general rule of smooth ventral osteoderms. Ventral rows break up into a shagreen of small plates on the neck, and a small number of wide rows under the tail. A dense assortment of small, non-overlapping plates, known as appendicular osteoderms, covered the front and hindlimbs.

== History ==
=== Early European finds ===
Aetosaur material was first described by Swiss paleontologist Louis Agassiz in 1844. He named the genus Stagonolepis from the Lossiemouth Sandstone in Elgin, Scotland, but considered the fossil to be a Devonian fish rather than a Triassic reptile. This may be because he considered the strata to be part of the Old Red Sandstone, and thus Paleozoic in age. Agassiz mistook the osteoderms for large rhomboidal scales, which he thought were arranged in a similar pattern to those of gars. He also thought that these supposed scales were very similar to those of the lobe-finned fish Megalichthys due to their large size.

English biologist Thomas Henry Huxley reconsidered the fish scales described by Agassiz and considered them to belong to a crocodilian. He first proposed this to the Geological Society of London in 1858, and went into more detail in an 1875 paper in the society's quarterly journal. By this time, new material had been uncovered from Elgin that indicated that Stagonolepis was not a fish, but a reptile. However, Stagonolepis was still known primarily by scutes and imprints of scutes, many of which were not well preserved.

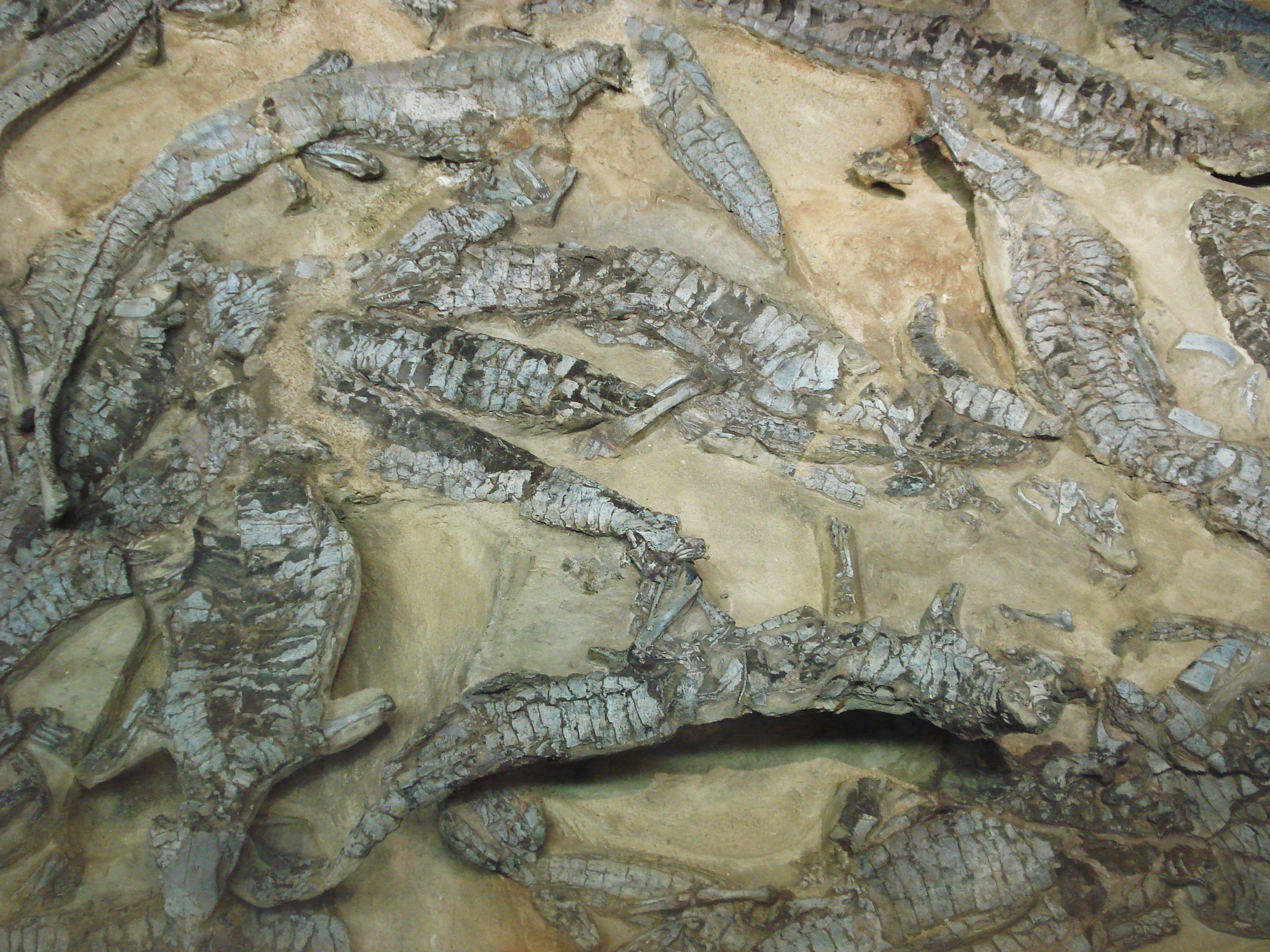
The articulated skeletons of 22 Aetosaurus, discovered near Stuttgart, Germany and first described by Oskar Fraas in 1877. The skeletons are now in the State Museum of Natural History Stuttgart.

More complete aetosaur remains were found from the Lower Stubensandtein of Germany in the 1870s. Among them were complete articulated skeletons of 22 aetosaurs. These specimens were found in a large sandstone outcrop near Stuttgart and were preserved together in an area less than 2 square metres in size. The animals were probably buried under lake sediment soon after they died, with the flow of water repositioning their bodies on the lake bed and putting them in close proximity to one another. In 1877, German paleontologist Oscar Fraas assigned these specimens to the newly erected genus Aetosaurus. Fraas named the genus after the skull's resemblance to the head of an eagle, with a narrow, elongate skull and a pointed snout.

=== First American aetosaurs ===
The first aetosaurs from North America were also being described in the 1870s. American paleontologist Edward Drinker Cope named Typothorax in 1875 and Episcoposaurus in 1877, both of which were from New Mexico. However, Cope considered these genera to be phytosaurs, crocodile-like aquatic archosaurs that were also common in the Late Triassic. While new material referable to Typothorax has been found in recent years throughout the American southwest, Episcoposaurus is no longer considered valid. Cope, along with later paleontologists such as Friedrich von Huene, recognized that remains of the type species E. horridus actually belonged to Typothorax. At the time, Cope considered Aetosauria to belong to Rhynchocephalia, an order of reptiles that includes the living tuatara. He also thought that the tightly fitting osteoderms, which were thought to be fused to the ribs, indicated that aetosaurs were transitional between rhynchocephalians and turtles. Another species, E. haplocerus, was reassigned to Desmatosuchus in 1953.

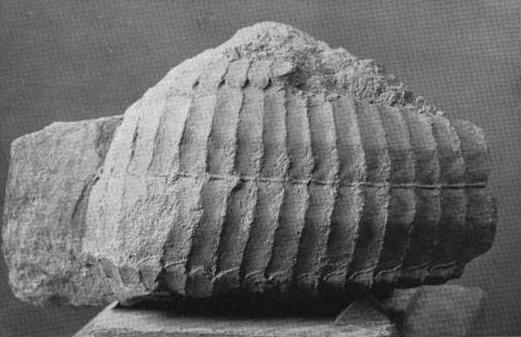
Photograph of the carapace of Stegomus, described by Marsh in 1896

A third North American genus called Stegomus was named by Othniel Charles Marsh in 1896. Marsh had a long-time rivalry with Cope that was made famous in the Bone Wars of the late 19th century, in which the two tried to out-compete one another in the field and in scientific literature. Unlike Cope's aetosaurs, Stegomus was found from the eastern United States in Connecticut. Marsh also recognized Stegomus as an aetosaur rather than a phytosaur in his initial description of the genus. Like Cope, many paleontologists tended to consider aetosaur scutes to belong to phytosaurs during this time period. Marsh considered aetosaurs to be closely related to dinosaurs based on their elongated metatarsals (foot bones).

As a distinct group, Aetosauria was named in 1889 by English naturalist Richard Lydekker and zoologist Henry Alleyne Nicholson. They considered Aetosauria to be one of three suborders of the order Crocodilia, the other two being Parasuchia (a group including phytosaurs and other Triassic forms) and Eusuchia (a group including all post-Triassic crocodylomorphs). Nicholson and Lydekker placed a single family within the suborder, Aëtosauridæ. They considered aetosaurs to be similar to living crocodilians despite their longer metatarsals.

=== 20th century updates ===
Aetosaur material continued to be described into the early 20th century, with notable paleontologists such as Barnum Brown and Charles Camp collecting specimens. Better remains of American aetosaurs helped to establish anatomical info for some common species, such as Desmatosuchus spurensis (described in detail by E.C. Case in 1922) and "Typothorax" meadei (now Longosuchus, described by H.J. Sawin in 1947). However, aetosaur remains were still being confused with those of phytosaurs, and they were still considered to be predominantly carnivorous and semiaquatic "parasuchians" . A.D. Walker's 1961 redescription of Stagonolepis robertsoni helped to divert these notions and established a more modern view of aetosaurian anatomy and ecology.

== Distribution ==
Aetosaur body fossils have been found in North America, South America, Europe, and parts of Asia and Africa.

Aetosaur fossils have been found on all continents except Australia and Antarctica, giving them a nearly worldwide distribution during the Late Triassic. Aetosaur remains are most abundant in northern (Laurasian) continents, and fossils are particularly common in the Chinle Formation and Dockum Group of the southwestern United States. Most fossils have been found in Arizona, New Mexico, and Texas. Some remains have also been found in Wyoming, Colorado, and Utah, particularly in Canyonlands National Park and Zion National Park. Aetosaurs are also known from the Newark Supergroup along the East Coast of the United States, in states such as Connecticut and North Carolina. Aetosaurus and Paratypothorax have been recovered from the Fleming Fjord Formation of Jameson Land, on the east coast of Greenland. These two genera were originally named from the Lower Stubensandstein of Germany. Scotland, Poland, and Italy have also produced aetosaur fossils. A few aetosaurs are known from northern Africa, with scutes having been found from the late Carnian Timesgadiouine Formation in Morocco. During the Late Triassic, Morocco would have been in close proximity with the Newark Supergroup of North America in the supercontinent of Pangaea. It is also possible that Desmatosuchus was present in Africa, as fossils from the Zarzaitine Series in Algeria have been referred to the genus.

Brachychirotherium footprints and trackways.

Aetosaurs are also found in areas corresponding to Gondwana (southern Pangaea), though they are considerably less common or diverse than in Northern continents. South American aetosaurs are known from Argentina, Brazil, and Chile. In Argentina, Aetosauroides and Neoaetosauroides hail from the Carnian Ischigualasto Formation and Norian Los Colorados Formation, respectively. In Brazil, fossils have been found in the Santa Maria and Caturrita Formations in Rio Grande do Sul (Paleorrota). Chilean aetosaurs are represented by one fragmentary genus, Chilenosuchus, from the Antofagasta Region. Aetosaurs have also been found in India, which, along with South America, was part of Gondwana during the Late Triassic. Early accounts of Indian aetosaurs were based on material from the Maleri Formation in south-central India, although most of these remains were too inadequate to assign specimens to any particular genus. Based on published descriptions, the Indian aetosaur fossils most closely resemble Longosuchus and Paratypothorax, which are considerably more specialized than most described Gondwanan aetosaurs. In 2023 a new aetosaur was named from the Lower Dharmaram Formation of India as Venkatasuchus armatus, a typothoracine aetosaur. Reports of aetosaurs from Madagascar are based on probable crocodylomorph scutes. Supposed aetosaurian footprints and skeletal material from South Africa are also unsubstantiated.

Footprints belonging to the ichnogenus Brachychirotherium are often associated with aetosaurs. Brachychirotherium are known from Rio Grande do Sul in Paleorrota, Brazil as well as Italy, Germany, the eastern United States, and many other aetosaur-bearing locales. They are also common in the southwestern United States, having been found in Canyonlands National Park and Dinosaur National Monument. Many of these tracks have a narrow gauge (meaning the left and right prints are placed closely together) and nearly overstep each other. A 2011 functional analysis of the skeleton of Typothorax coccinarum indicated that it had the range of movement necessary to produce the tracks.

== Classification ==
=== Taxonomy ===
Aetosaurs belong to Pseudosuchia, a clade of archosaurs that includes living crocodilians and is characterized by the distinctive structure of the ankle bones. Aetosaurs were traditionally referred to a (now obsolete) group called the thecodonts, which included all "primitive" crocodilian relatives that lived in the Triassic. With the rise of phylogenetics, aetosaurs were later placed in a group called Suchia, which included many Triassic crurotarsans as well as later crurotarsans, including crocodilians.

Originally, all aetosaurs were considered members of the family Stagonolepididae. Early phylogenetic analyses split aetosaurs into two subfamilies, Aetosaurinae and Desmatosuchinae. Aetosaurines are characterized by projections called eminences on the dorsal paramedian osteoderms that are close to the midline of the back. Desmatosuchines have a few more distinguishing characteristics, including grooves on the dorsal paramedians that help them lock to the lateral plates in a tight articulation. Many desmatosuchines have long spikes projecting from the lateral plates. These spikes are especially prominent in Desmatosuchus. Aetosaurines, on the other hand, tend to have less spikes. Many aetosaurines, such as Aetosaurus and Neoaetosauroides, have smooth carapaces and lack spikes altogether. More recent studies (see below) have favored a third group, Typothoracinae, which like Desmatosuchinae has long spikes, but differs in having more sharply angled joints between osteoderms. Moreover, the genus Aetosauroides is now often classified outside Stagonolepididae as a non-stagonolepidid aetosaur, making the names Aetosauria and Stagonolepididae no longer synonymous.

==== List of genera ====
Genus	Status	Age	Location	Geological unit	Notes	Images
Acaenasuchus	Non-aetosaurian	middle Norian (Adamanian)	USA (Arizona)	Chinle Formation (Blue Mesa Member, Sonsela Member)	A valid species of non-aetosaur aetosauriform, previously considered a valid aetosaur or juvenile specimens of Desmatosuchus spurensis.	
Acompsosaurus	Nomen dubium	Late Triassic (Adamanian)	USA (New Mexico)	Chinle Group (Bluewater Creek Formation)	A dubious aetosaur based on a pelvis which is now lost. Possibly a junior synonym of Stagonolepis or Calyptosuchus.	
Adamanasuchus	Valid	early - middle Norian (Adamanian)	USA (Arizona)	Chinle Formation (Blue Mesa Member)	A large desmatosuchian, closely related to Calyptosuchus and Scutarx.	
Aetobarbakinoides	Valid	late Carnian - early Norian	Brazil	Santa Maria Formation	An aetosaur with aetosaurine-like osteoderms and desmatosuchine-like vertebrae.	
Aetosauroides	Valid	Carnian - Norian	Argentina, Brazil	Ischigualasto Formation, Santa Maria Formation	Currently considered the most basal aetosaur, as well as the most well-studied member of the group from Gondwana. It may have had a more carnivorous diet than most other aetosaurs.	
Aetosaurus	Valid	middle Norian - early Rhaetian? (Revueltian)	Germany, Italy, Greenland	Lower Stubensandtein, Calcare di Zorzino Formation, Fleming Fjord Formation	A small (1.5 m, 5 ft long) aetosaurine aetosaur with a wide geographic distribution in Europe.	
Apachesuchus	Valid	late Norian - Rhaetian (Apachean)	USA	Redonda Formation	A large, late-surviving probable typothoracine known solely from smooth osteoderms.	
Argentinosuchus	Nomen dubium	Carnian - Norian	Argentina	Ischigualasto Formation	An indeterminate aetosaur similar to Aetosauroides and Stagonolepis	
Calyptosuchus	Valid	early - middle Norian (Adamanian)	USA (Arizona, Texas)	Chinle Formation (Blue Mesa Member), Tecovas Formation	A desmatosuchian similar to Stagonolepis, which it was formerly considered to be a species of.	
Chilenosuchus	Valid	Late Triassic	Chile	El Bordo Formation	A poorly-known aetosaur similar to Typothorax. It was found in strata that were originally thought to be Carboniferous or Permian in age, rather than Triassic.	
Coahomasuchus	Valid	Carnian? (Otischalkian)	USA (Texas, North Carolina)	Colorado City Formation, Pekin Formation	A small but wide-bodied aetosaur closely related to typothoracines.	
Desmatosuchus	Valid	early - middle Norian (Adamanian - earliest Revueltian?)	USA (Texas, Arizona, New Mexico)	Cooper Canyon Formation, Tecovas Formation, Santa Rosa Formation, Chinle Formation (Blue Mesa Member, Sonsela Member)	Namesake of the desmatosuchines, one of the largest, most common, and most impressively-armored aetosaurs.	
Garzapelta	Valid	Norian? (Adamanian - Revueltian)	USA (Texas)	Cooper Canyon Formation	A possible paratypothoracine that possessed lateral osteoderms that converged with those of desmatosuchines	
Gorgetosuchus	Valid	Carnian? (Otischalkian)	USA (North Carolina)	Pekin Formation	A possible desmatosuchin characterized by cervical osteoderms that almost encircle the neck	
Heliocanthus	Junior synonym				Junior synonym of Rioarribasuchus	
Kocurypelta	Valid	Late Triassic	Poland	Grabowa Formation	A paratypothoracin diagnosed from skull fragments	
Kryphioparma	Valid	early - middle Norian (Adamanian)	USA (Arizona)	Chinle Formation (Blue Mesa Member)	A typhothoracine based on fossils previously referred to Tecovasuchus	
Longosuchus	Valid	Carnian? (Otischalkian)	USA (Texas)	Colorado City Formation	A well-described desmatosuchin, the subject of major studies on aetosaur anatomy in the mid-20th century.	
Lucasuchus	Valid	Carnian? (Otischalkian)	USA (Texas, North Carolina)	Colorado City Formation, Pekin Formation	A desmatosuchin often conflated with Longosuchus, which it coexisted with.	
Neoaetosauroides	Valid	middle Norian (Revueltian)	Argentina	Los Colorados Formation	A late-surviving basal desmatosuchian with apparent adaptations for a more carnivorous diet than most other aetosaurs.	
Olkasuchus	Valid	middle Norian (Revueltian)	Argentina	Los Colorados Formation	A basal desmatosuchian closely related to Neoaetosauroides.	
Paratypothorax	Valid	Norian (Adamanian - Revueltian)	Germany, USA (Arizona, New Mexico, Texas), Greenland	Lower Stubensandstein, Chinle Formation, Dockum Group, Fleming Fjord Formation	The widespread and well-known namesake of the clade Paratypothoracini. Some authors have suggested that it represents an adult form of Aetosaurus.	
Polesinesuchus	Valid?	late Carnian - early Norian	Brazil	Santa Maria Formation	A small aetosaur based on an immature specimen, which may be referrable to Aetosauroides.	
Redondasuchus	Valid	late Norian - Rhaetian (Apachean)	USA (New Mexico)	Redonda Formation	A large typothoracinae often considered a close relative or species of Typothorax.	
Rioarribasuchus	Valid	middle - late Norian (Revueltian)	USA (New Mexico, Arizona)	Chinle Formation (Petrified Forest Member, Sonsela Member), Bull Canyon Formation	A narrow-bodied paratypothoracin with elongated spines on paramedian osteoderms above the hip.	
Scutarx	Valid	middle Norian (Adamanian)	USA (Arizona, Texas)	Chinle Formation (Sonsela Member), Cooper Canyon Formation	A strongly-armored desmatosuchian closely related to Calyptosuchus.	
Sierritasuchus	Valid	early - middle Norian (Adamanian)	USA (Texas)	Tecovas Formation	A desmatosuchin known from an immature specimen originally assigned to Desmatosuchus.	
Stagonolepis	Valid	Carnian	Scotland, Poland	Lossiemouth Sandstone, Krasiejów deposits	The first aetosaur to be described, previously used as a wastebasket taxon for other narrow-bodied basal aetosaurs.	
Stegomus	Junior synonym or Nomen dubium	Norian (Revueltian)	USA (Connecticut, New Jersey, North Carolina)	New Haven Arkose, Passaic Formation, Sanford Formation	A small aetosaur only known from interior molds of a dorsal carapace. Often interpreted as a dubious genus or a junior synonym of Aetosaurus	
Stenomyti	Valid	late Norian (Revueltian)	USA (Colorado)	Chinle Formation (red siltstone member)	A small basal aetosaurine originally assigned to Aetosaurus, a close relative.	
Tecovasuchus	Valid	early - middle Norian (Adamanian)	USA (Texas, New Mexico, Arizona?)	Tecovas Formation, Chinle Group (Bluewater Creek Formation, Blue Mesa Member?)	A typical wide-bodied paratypothoracin	
Typothorax	Valid	middle - late Norian (latest Adamanian - Revueltian)	USA (Arizona, Texas, New Mexico)	Chinle Formation (Sonsela Member, Petrified Forest Member), Cooper Canyon Formation, Bull Canyon Formation,	An abundant wide-bodied typothoracine, known from multiple articulated skeletons.	
Venkatasuchus	Valid	middle Norian to Rhaetian	India	Lower Dharmaram Formation	A wide-bodied typothoracine, known from a series of associated paramedian and lateral osteoderms as well as an isolated paramedian osteoderm.	

=== Phylogeny ===
Cladogram from Parrish (1994)

- Rauisuchiformes
  - Prestosuchidae
  - Aetosauria
    - Aetosaurus
    - - - Aetosauroides
        - Stagonolepis
      - - Longosuchus
        - Desmatosuchus
        - - Typothorax
          - Paratypothorax
      - Neoaetosauroides

Aetosaur phylogeny was first investigated in 1994 by paleontologist J. Michael Parrish. Aetosauroides, Aetosaurus, Desmatosuchus, Longosuchus, Neoaetosauroides, Stagonolepis, and Typothorax were included in the phylogenetic analysis. Aetosaurs were found to form a clade with rauisuchians, which Parrish termed Rauisuchiformes. Rauisuchiformes also included the superorder Crocodylomorpha, to which living crocodilians belong. Parrish found Aetosauria to be a monophyletic group and thus a true clade consisting of a common aetosaur ancestor and all of its descendants. To phylogenetically define Aetosauria, Parrish identified five synapomorphies, or shared characteristics. The first synapomorphy concerned the jaw, with the premaxilla at its tip being edentulous (toothless), upturned, and wide to form a "shovel". Moreover, the dentary bone in the lower jaw is also toothless, upturned, and broad. The reduced size and simple conical shape of the teeth was considered another synapomorphy. Two more synapomorphies of aetosaurs are shared with crocodylomorphs, but were not considered to be an indication of a close phylogenetic relationship; the body is covered in dorsal and ventral armor to form a complete carapace, and the paramedian osteoderms are much wider than they are long, with distinctive pitting. A final synapomorphy was found in the structure of the limb bones. In all aetosaurs, the limbs are very robust, with large muscle attachments such as the deltopectoral crest of the humerus, the fourth trochanter of the femur, the intracondylar ridge of the tibia, and the iliofibularis trochanter of the fibula.

In Parrish's phylogenetic analysis, Aetosaurus was found to be the most basal member of the clade, the earliest to diverge after the most recent common ancestor. After Aetosaurus, there is a polytomy of three smaller clades in which it is unknown which clade diverged first from the group. Within this polytomy there was Neoaetosauroides, a clade containing Aetosauroides and Stagonolepis, and another polytomy that included Longosuchus, Desmatosuchus, and a clade containing Paratypothorax and Typothorax.

A later study by paleontologists Andrew B. Heckert and Spencer G. Lucas in 1999 expanded the number of synapomorphies that diagnose Aetosauria to 18. New synapomorphies included temporal fenestrae, or holes, that opened on the side of the skull rather than the top, lateral osteoderms articulating with the paramedians, and osteoderms covering the limbs. Aetosaurus was still found to be the most basal member, but the phylogeny of more derived aetosaurs differed in that Typothorax and Paratypothorax were split into two different clades with their sister taxa being Desmatosuchus and Longosuchus, respectively. More importantly, a new aetosaur called Coahomasuchus was included in the analysis. Coahomasuchus was found to be a basal aetosaur closely related to Stagonolepis, and also appeared early in the fossil record of aetosaurs. Previously, basal members were only known from later times, occurring after more advanced aetosaurs.

In 2003, paleontologists Simon R. Harris, David J. Gower, and Mark Wilkinson examined previous phylogenetic studies of aetosaurs and criticized the way in which they used certain characters to produce cladograms. They concluded that only three hypotheses of aetosaur relationships from previous studies were still true: that Aetosaurus is the most basal aetosaur, that Aetosauroides is the sister taxon of Stagonolepis robertsoni, and that Longosuchus and Desmatosuchus are more closely related to each other than either is to Neoaetosauroides. They also went on to correct the trees from all previous analyses.

More recently, a 2007 analysis by paleontologist William G. Parker resulted in a larger tree of aetosaur phylogenetics with the inclusion of Heliocanthus. Based on the tree, Parker defined the clades Typothoracisinae and Paratypothoracisini, both within Aetosaurinae. Parker also gave a revised phylogenetic definition of Aetosauria, mentioning that the previous definition, made by Heckert and Lucas in 2000, was somewhat ambiguous. Heckert & Lucas (2000) defined Aetosauria as a stem-based taxon, claiming that Aetosauria included all crurotarsans that were more closely related to Desmatosuchus than to the immediate sister group of Aetosauria. Because the immediate sister group of Aetosauria was uncertain, Parker offered a new definition with several non-aetosaur crurotarsan genera rather than one sister group. According to Parker, Aetosauria included all taxa more closely related to Aetosaurus and Desmatosuchus than to Leptosuchus, Postosuchus, Prestosuchus, Poposaurus, Sphenosuchus, Alligator, Gracilisuchus, and Revueltosaurus.

A new genus of aetosaur, Aetobarbakinoides, was named in 2012. The phylogenetic analysis in that study found Aetosaurinae to be a paraphyletic grouping. As a paraphyletic group, aetosaurines would share a most recent common ancestor that is also the ancestor of other non-aetosaurine aetosaurs, and thus could not form their own clade. Parker's 2007 analysis accepted this definition. In 2002, Heckert and Lucas defined Aetosaurinae as "a stem-based taxon containing all taxa more closely related to Aetosaurus than to the last common ancestor of Aetosaurus and Desmatosuchus". The 2012 study placed Aetosaurus at the base of the stagonolepidid clade, with traditional aetosaurine taxa placed in successively more derived positions. In the analysis, these taxa are actually more closely related to Desmatosuchus than to Aetosaurus. Thus, under Heckert and Lucas's definition Aetosaurinae might be restricted to only Aetosaurus itself.

Another finding of this study was that Aetosauroides lies outside Stagonolepididae. If this phylogeny is correct, Stagonolepididae and Aetosauria would not be equivalent groupings, and Aetosauroides would be the first non-stagonolepidid aetosaur. The following cladogram simplified after an analysis presented by Devin K. Hoffman, Andrew B. Heckert, and Lindsay E. Zanno.

- Aetosauria
  - Aetosauroides
  - Stagonolepididae
    - Aetosaurinae
      - Coahomasuchus
      - Aetosaurus
      - Typothoracisinae
        - - Gorgetosuchus
          - Redondasuchus
          - Typothorax
        - - Tecovasuchus
          - - Rioarribasuchus
            - - Paratypothorax 19003
              - Paratypothorax type
    - - Stagonolepidinae
        - Calyptosuchus wellesi
        - Stagonolepis robertsoni
      - Desmatosuchinae
        - Neoaetosauroides
        - - - Polesinesuchus
            - Aetobarbakinoides
          - - Longosuchus
            - - Sierritasuchus
              - Acaenasuchus
              - - Desmatosuchus smalli
                - Desmatosuchus spurensis

In 2016, William Parker conducted a new phylogenetic analysis of the Aetosauria, proposing an alternative hypothesis of aetosaur relationships. Below is the cladogram:

- Aetosauria
  - Aetosauroides scagliai
  - Stagonolepididae
    - Aetosaurinae
      - Stenomyti huangae
      - - Aetosaurus ferratus
        - Coahomasuchus kahleorum
        - Typothoracinae
          - Apachesuchus heckerti
          - - - Typothorax coccinarum
              - Redondasuchus rineharti
            - Paratypothoracisini
              - Rioarribasuchus chamaensis
              - - SMSN 19003
                - - Tecovasuchus chatterjeei
                  - - Paratypothorax sp.
                    - Paratypothorax andressorum
    - Desmatosuchia
      - Stagonolepidinae
        - Polesinesuchus aurelioi
        - Stagonolepis robertsoni
      - Desmatosuchinae
        - "Stagonolepis" olenkae
        - - Neoaetosauroides engaeus
          - - - Calyptosuchus wellesi
              - - Adamanasuchus eisenhardtae
                - Scutarx deltatylus
            - Desmatosuchini
              - Gorgetosuchus pekinensis
              - - Longosuchus meadei
                - - Sierritasuchus macalpini
                  - - Lucasuchus hunti
                    - - Desmatosuchus smalli
                      - Desmatosuchus spurensis

=== Origin and evolution ===
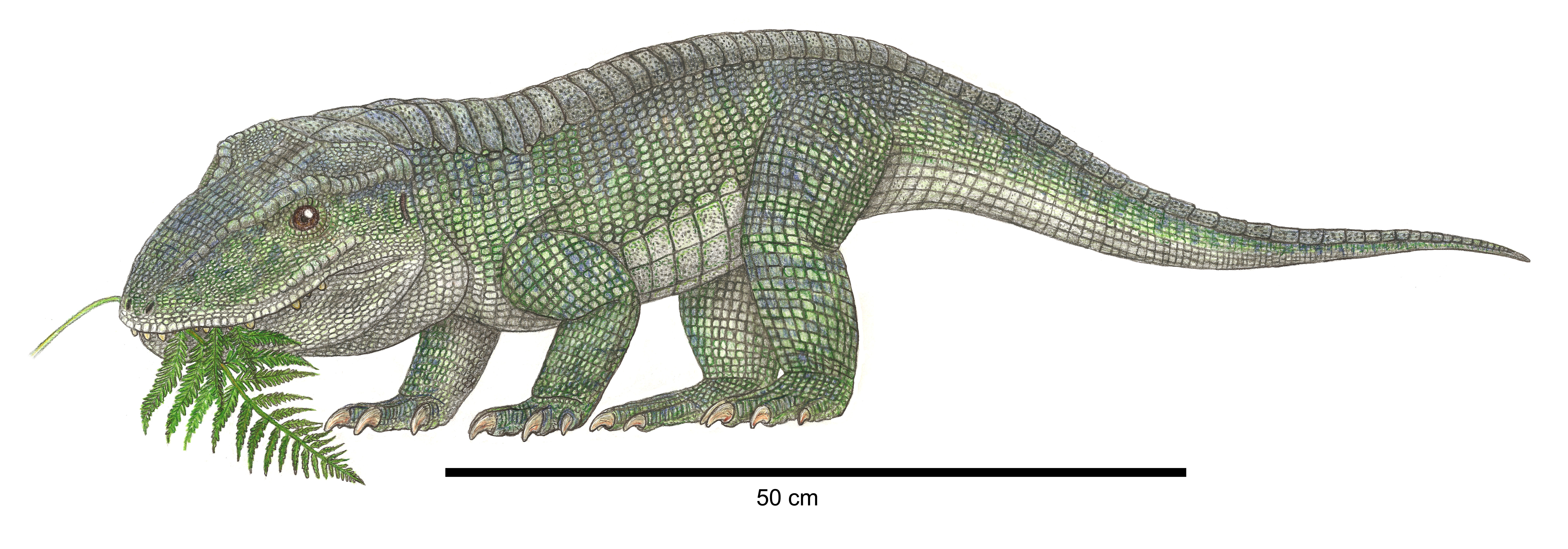
Life restoration of Revueltosaurus callenderi, a pseudosuchian that may be close to the ancestry of aetosaurs.

Although aetosaurs are known exclusively from the Late Triassic, their currently accepted position in archosaur phylogeny indicates that they originated from more basal pseudosuchian archosaurs in the Early or Middle Triassic. Given that aetosaurs are highly specialized with many anatomical features not seen in other pseudosuchians, the group's evolutionary origins are poorly understood. The recent discovery of complete specimens of the Late Triassic pseudosuchian Revueltosaurus callenderi indicate that it may have been close to the ancestry of aetosaurs. Several phylogenetic analyses place it as the sister taxon or closest relative of Aetosauria. Like aetosaurs, Revueltosaurus has two rows of paramedian osteoderms along its back and, in the cheek region of the skull, a maxilla that fits into a groove of the jugal bone. One phylogenetic analysis places Turfanosuchus dabanensis, a Middle Triassic pseudosuchian, as the sister taxon of Revueltosaurus and Aetosauria, potentially making it the earliest known "stem aetosaur" ("stem" meaning that it lies on the branch that includes aetosaurs, but is not itself an aetosaur). However, other studies have considered Turfanosuchus part of a different family of pseudosuchians, the gracilisuchids.

In 2012 another "stem aetosaur" was described from the Middle Triassic Manda Beds of Tanzania. It differs from other Middle Triassic pseudosuchians in having a long skull, a small antorbital fenestra that fits into a large antorbital fossa in front of the eye socket, sharp and curved teeth, and osteoderms covering much of its body. Like aetosaurs and Revueltosaurus, it has a maxilla that fits into the jugal. Revueltosaurus, Turfanosuchus, and the unnamed Tanzanian pseudosuchian are all good fits for the hypothesized ancestor of aetosaurs because they both have double rows of leaf-shaped osteoderms along their backs that could potentially have evolved into the tightly fitting paramedian osteoderms of aetosaurs.

== Paleobiology ==
=== Early interpretations ===
In 1904, American paleontologist Henry Fairfield Osborn described aetosaurs as carnivorous aquatic animals of the order Parasuchia, mentioning that "[Parasuchia] constitutes an independent order, probably freshwater, littoral, carnivorous, short snouted (Aëtosaurus) or long snouted (Phytosaurus, Mystriosuchus) forms, analogous in their habits to the modern Crocodilia". Early aetosaur remains were often found in clays beside skeletons of aquatic animals such as phytosaurs and terrestrial animals such as dinosaurs and trilophosaurs. This may have led some paleontologists to believe that the animals had died in swampy environments. Because there were a large number of skeletons of animals that would not normally have inhabited swamps in these clays, some paleontologists even suggested that aetosaurs scavenged off the carcasses of animals that became trapped in the swamps and died. Doubts were later raised over this lifestyle, since aetosaur teeth show little indication of carnivory and the weight of the armor suggests that aetosaurs had "a passive mode of life." However, aetosaurs were still regarded as partly aquatic into the mid-20th century.

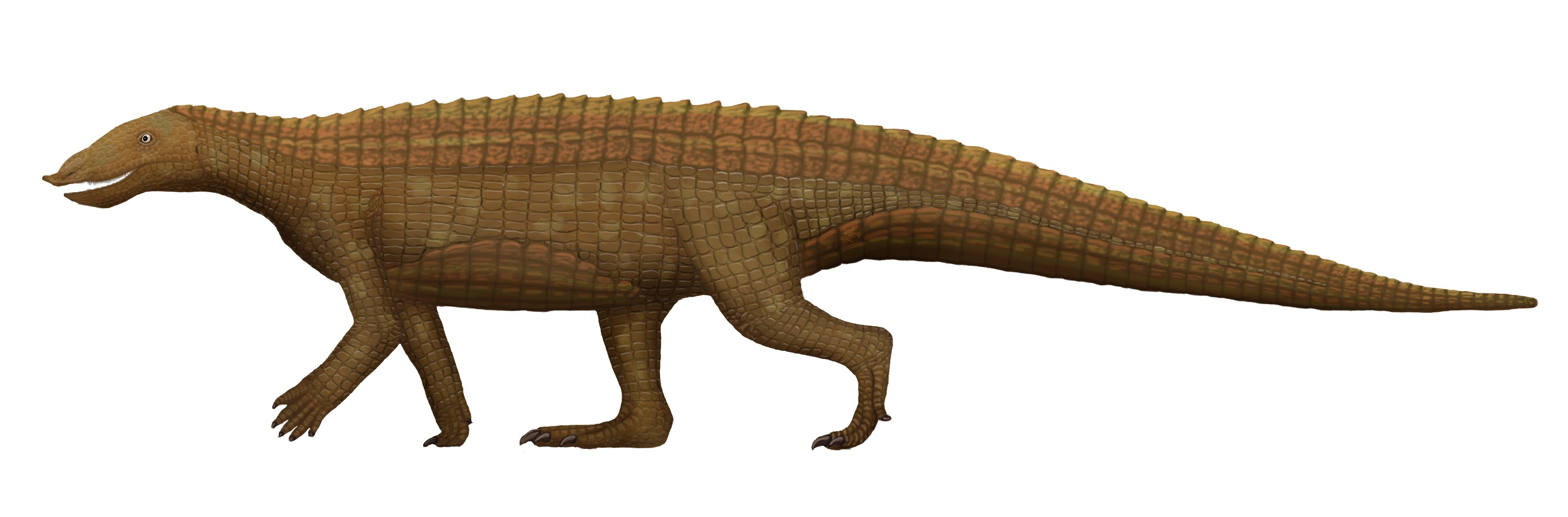
Restorations of Stagonolepis robertsoni, after skeletal by Hartman, 2016

=== Diet ===
Aetosaurs were herbivores, likely feeding on ferns and seed ferns that were common in the Triassic. The upturned shape of their snout suggests that aetosaurs may have dug up roots and tubers. Aetosaurs have several anatomical features that may have been adaptations to digging, including a short radius relative to the humerus (seen in many other digging tetrapods) and a large deltopectoral crest on the humerus that served as an attachment for muscles. Aetosaurs also have large hind feet, or pes, with large claws that were likely used for skratch-digging. One aetosaur, Typothorax, has an entepicondyle on the humerus, which is the origin of forearm pronator and manual flexor muscles often used in digging. Moreover, it has a large olecranon process on the ulna which projects backward past the elbow, giving a large area for the insertion of the triceps muscle. While many studies have suggested that aetosaurs had a fossorial or burrowing lifestyle, aetosaurs have few of the characteristics that fossorial animals have as adaptations to digging. Therefore, it is likely that aetosaurs were able to dig to some extent, possibly rooting for food, but were unable to burrow.

While features of the limbs indicate that aetosaurs probably dug for food, features of the skull and teeth can indicate what kind of food they were eating. Aetosaurs have many derived features not seen in other crurotarsans, which indicate that they are adapted to a different diet. Unlike the sharp, recurved teeth of other triassic archosaurs, aetosaurs had simple, conical teeth. The tips of the jaws were edentulous, or toothless, and probably supported a beak. The teeth have very little wear, suggesting that aetosaurs did not consume stiff and tough plant material. It is more likely that they consumed non-abrasive vegetation such as soft leaves.

Alternative theories have been proposed for the diet of aetosaurs. In 1947, H J Sawin proposed that the aetosaur Longosuchus was a scavenger based on the close proximity of some specimens to a large number of skeletons that were likely carcasses. A 2009 study of the jaw biomechanics of the South American genus Neoaetosauroides suggested that the animal may have fed on larvae and insects without hard exoskeletons. This is because Neoaetosauroides lacks serrations or wear facets on the teeth and has a jaw leverage that is not designed for strong forces such as crushing and chopping. The study recognized that northern aetosaurs such as Desmatosuchus and Stagonolepis did have jaws that would have supported a strong musculature, and were likely better suited to eating plant material.

=== Nests ===
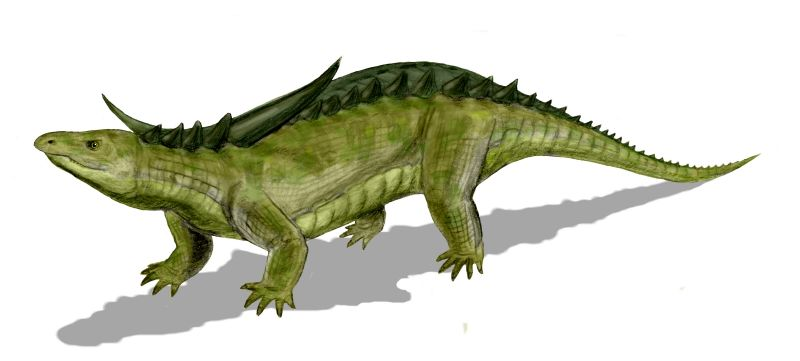
Life restoration of Desmatosuchus haplocerus. This is likely the animal that made the nests discovered there in 1996.

At least some aetosaurs built nests and protected their eggs.

In 1996, geologist Stephen Hasiotis discovered 220‑million-year-old, fossilized, bowl-like pits in Arizona's Petrified Forest, in part of the Chinle Formation, assumed to be aetosaur and phytosaur nests. The "nests" are compacted and appear very similar to the nests of the modern day crocodiles who guard their nests. However, it seems that these "nests" are instead the result of sandstone weathering.

A second possible aetosaur nest site is known from northeastern Italy. The nests are preserved as depressions in carbonate rock that are circular or horseshoe-shaped, with high ridges around the sides. They appear to be unusually complex for nests created by Triassic reptiles. Archosaur footprints were found nearby that resembled aetosaurs, although they were not present in the same layer. Because the tracks were found so close to the nests, it is likely that aetosaurs built them.

=== Development ===
The ages of individual aetosaurs can be determined by examining their osteoderms. Some isolated osteoderms have been claimed to belong to juvenile aetosaurs based on their size and shape but these hypotheses have often been questioned. For example, juvenile osteoderms of Calyptosuchus were later identified as those of the small-bodied pseudosuchian Revueltosaurus (which is not an aetosaur), and juvenile osteoderms of Desmatosuchus have been reinterpreted as those of aetosaur Acaenasuchus, which had a relatively small body size at maturity. Studies of the bone structure of paramedian osteoderms indicate that new bone was deposited along the edges of each plate over the course of an aetosaur's lifetime. This means that lines of arrested growth on the undersides of paramedian osteoderms can be used to determine an individual's age. Comparing the ages of individual specimens with their total body lengths indicates that aetosaurs increased in length at relatively constant rates, but increased in body mass at different rates depending on whether they had wide bodies like Typothorax or narrow bodies like Aetobarbakinoides. Aetosaurs also seem to have grown more slowly than modern crocodilians. Analysis of the limb bones of aetosaurs indicates that they grew quickly when young and more slowly when adults. This pattern of growth is seen in most other pseudosuchians.

== Biochronology ==
Because species of aetosaurs typically have restricted fossil ranges and are abundant in the strata they are found in, they are useful in biochronology. Osteoderms are the most common remains associated with aetosaurs, so a single identifiable scute can accurately date the layer it is found in.

Aetosaur biochronology
Axis scale: millions of years ago. References: Lucas et al. (1998), Heckert et al. (2007)

One aetosaur, Typothorax coccinarum, has been used to define the Revueltian land vertebrate faunachron. A land vertebrate faunachron (LVF) is a time interval that is defined by the first appearance datum (FAD), or first occurrence, of a tetrapod index fossil and is commonly used to date Late Triassic and Early Jurassic terrestrial strata. Since the FAD of T. coccinarum is at the beginning of the Norian stage, the Revueltian LVF starts at the beginning of the Norian around 216 million years ago. The Revueltian ends with the next FAD, which happens to be that of the phytosaur Redondasaurus and the start of the Apachean LVF.

Biochrons for aetosaur genera have been developed for dating strata in the Chinle Group of the southwestern United States. Up to 13 genera of aetosaurs are known from the Chinle Group, with most occurring in multiple localities and over short time spans. In 1996, paleontologists Spencer G. Lucas and Andrew B. Heckert recognized five biochrons based on the presence of aetosaurs throughout the Chinle Group. The number of biochrons grew to 11 in a 2007 study by Heckert and Lucas along with Adrian P. Hunt and Justin A. Spielmann. These biochrons occurred from the Otischalkian LVF to the Apachean LVF and included genera such as Longosuchus, Tecovasuchus, and Typothorax.

== "Aetogate" naming controversy ==
In 2007, paleontologists at the New Mexico Museum of Natural History and Science in Albuquerque, New Mexico were accused of plagiarism in some of their published articles dealing with aetosaurs. In December 2006, the genus Rioarribasuchus was erected as a replacement name for "Desmatosuchus" chamaensis in the museum's bulletin. However, four years earlier paleontologist William Parker reassigned "D." chamaensis to the newly named genus Heliocanthus in an unpublished thesis, which was widely disseminated among aetosaur researchers. Because the name was not formally published, it was considered a nomen nudum until January 2007, when Parker's description of Heliocanthus was published in the Journal of Systematic Palaeontology. The authors of the 2006 paper, Spencer G. Lucas, Adrian P. Hunt, and Justin A. Spielmann, were accused of "intellectual theft" by paleontologists Jeff Martz, Mike Taylor, Matt Wedel, and Darren Naish, who claimed that Lucas et al. knew that Parker would eventually redescribe the species and formally erect a new genus. According to Martz, Taylor, Wedel, and Naish, the authors rushed to publish their own name before Parker could publish his. At the time, Lucas, Hunt, and Spielmann were on the editorial board of the NMMNHS bulletin, while Hunt was also the museum director.

A coinciding controversy occurred after Spielmann, Hunt, and Lucas published a 2006 paper mentioning that the holotype of Redondasuchus was not a left paramedian, but instead a right one. In 2002, Jeff Martz came to the same conclusion in an unpublished thesis. He, along with Taylor, Wedel, and Naish, claimed that this was another form of plagiarism, as Martz's 2002 thesis was cited by Spielmann et al. (2006), even if his conclusion on Redondasuchus was not mentioned.

The allegations were rejected in an internal NMMNHS meeting, reported by Lucas in 2008. They were also brought to the attention of an independent party, the Ethics Education Committee of the Society of Vertebrate Paleontology (SVP) in 2007, and a response was given in 2008. In regard to Redondasuchus, the SVP found no explicit evidence for plagiarism. In the case of Heliocanthus and Rioarribasuchus, the SVP did not try to resolve the issue, as Lucas et al. and Parker offered conflicting accounts regarding communication and intent. The SVP's response concluded with an update to its ethics policy and recommendations for how similar controversies could be better handled in the future. The entire controversy came to be known as "Aetogate", in reference to the famous Watergate scandal of the 1970s. It received wide attention from local Albuquerque newspapers and science blogs. It was also the focus of a news article in a 2008 issue of the journal Nature.

== General references ==
- Benton, M. J. (2000). Vertebrate Paleontology, 2nd ed. Blackwell Science Ltd.
