= Chilenosuchus =

Chilenosuchus Temporal range: Late Triassic ~235–201.6 Ma

Scientific classification
- Kingdom: Animalia
- Phylum: Chordata
- Class: Reptilia
- Clade: Archosauria
- Clade: Pseudosuchia
- Order: †Aetosauria
- Family: †Stagonolepididae
- Genus: †Chilenosuchus; Casamiquela 1980

Species
- †C. forttae Casamiquela 1980 (type)

Extinct genus of reptiles

Chilenosuchus is an extinct genus of aetosaur. Fossils have been found in the El Bordo Formation, in the Antofagasta Region in northern Chile.

== Description ==
The presence of Chilenosuchus in the beds that it was found in conflicts with the inferred age of the strata. Fossil plants and invertebrates suggest that it dates back to the late Carboniferous or Early Permian, yet Chilenosuchus is an aetosaur, and the first aetosaurs appeared in the Late Triassic. Poor-quality photographs of the original specimen and an apparent lack of substantial material could not allow for definite classification of the specimen, so there was initially much controversy as to whether or not the fossil was from a true aetosaur. However, a reevaluation in 2003 upon the relocation of the material showed that it was in fact an aetosaur and that the strata were of Triassic age.

Based on similarities in the armour plating, Chilenosuchus seems to be closely related to Typothorax. It has been proposed to be a member of a recently devised clade, Typothoracisinae, along with Typothorax and several other similar aetosaurs. However, because of the many other differences between it and other aetosaurs, the position of Chilenosuchus within Stagonolepididae will remain uncertain until more material can be found.
