= Sierritasuchus =

Sierritasuchus Temporal range: Late Triassic

Scientific classification
- Kingdom: Animalia
- Phylum: Chordata
- Class: Reptilia
- Clade: Archosauria
- Clade: Pseudosuchia
- Order: †Aetosauria
- Family: †Stagonolepididae
- Subfamily: †Desmatosuchinae
- Genus: †Sierritasuchus; Parker et al., 2008

Species
- †S. macalpini Parker et al., 2008 (type)

Extinct genus of reptiles

Sierritasuchus is an extinct genus of aetosaur in the subfamily Desmatosuchinae. It is known from a small holotype skeleton from the Late Triassic Tecovas Formation of Texas. This skeleton (known as UMMP V60817) was discovered in 1939 and was originally assigned to the genus Desmatosuchus. It was placed in its own genus in 2008 after having been in the collections of the University of Michigan Museum of Paleontology, with the type species being S. macalpini. The generic name refers to Sierrita de la Cruz Creek where the holotype was found, and the specific name refers to Archie MacAlpin, who discovered the skeleton. Based on the histology of the scutes of the holotype, the individual was a subadult that was not fully grown.

Sierritasuchus can be distinguished from other aetosaurs by several unique features as well as a distinct combination of features in its scutes. Unlike other aetosaurs, Sierritasuchus has recurved spines along its side that are serrated on the front edges. Additionally, there is a distinct ridge on the posterior surface of each dorsal eminence. Dorsal eminences are small projections on the surfaces of paramedian scutes that line the back of the animal on either side of the vertebral column. In Sierritasuchus, the dorsal eminence touches the posterior margin of the paramedian scute. Each paramedian scute is covered in a random pattern of pits. Both the paramedian and lateral scutes (which run along the side of the animal beneath the paramedians) have anterior bars.
