= Calyptosuchus =

Calyptosuchus Temporal range: Late Triassic, mid Norian, ~219 Ma

Scientific classification
- Kingdom: Animalia
- Phylum: Chordata
- Class: Reptilia
- Clade: Archosauria
- Clade: Pseudosuchia
- Order: †Aetosauria
- Family: †Stagonolepididae
- Genus: †Calyptosuchus; Long & Ballew, 1985

Type species
- †Calyptosuchus wellesi Long & Ballew ,1985

Extinct genus of reptiles

Calyptosuchus (meaning "covered crocodile") is an extinct genus of aetosaur from the Late Triassic of North America. Like other aetosaurs, it was heavily armored and had a pig-like snout used to uproot plants.

== Description ==
Calyptosuchus was estimated to have been four metres long, or possibly larger, with a maximum carapace width of almost seventy centimetres. The osteoderms were not entirely fused. Each row of the osteoderms corresponded to one vertebra, and comprised four dorsal osteoderms. Two small squarish osteoderms formed the outside of the row (about 10 by 10 cm), and two much broader osteoderms (approximately 20 by 10 cm) formed the inside of the row and covered most of the back. Each of the lateral osteoderms have a raised boss towards the centre at the posterior end of the osteoderm, and are almost bent around the side of the creature, with a dorsal flange along the back contacting the paramedian (dorsal) osteoderms and a lateral flange running a little way down the side. This would probably have given it quite a boxy look. The paramedian osteoderms also have a raised boss, called a dorsal eminence, in the posterior centre of the osteoderm but do not bend around in the same manner. There are ventral osteoderms known, but they have not been preserved in the natural alignment as the dorsal and lateral osteoderms have and so we are uncertain how they were arranged. They appear to have been flat and rectangular.

The only skull fragment that is certainly Calyptosuchus is a dentary bone - no other cranial bones have been assigned to it with certainty. Only a middle part of the dentary is present, with an edentulous patch to the anterior and nine dental alveoli posteriorly. No teeth are preserved except a few fragments of root. A maxilla assigned with partial certainty to Calyptosuchus has five dental alveoli, and probably contacted the external naris at a point.

The vertebrae have keels, unusually among aetosaurs, and the axis vertebra has a noticeable concavity in the sides above which the zygapophyses protrude. Most of these are broken. The centrum of the axis is slightly wider than it is tall, but those of the other cervical vertebrae are taller than they are wide. Neural spines and arches are elongated in all the vertebrae along the trunk, and their centra have a concave anterior face and a flat posterior face. They are spool-shaped, typically for aetosaur vertebrae. Their neural canals are large and deep. The sacral vertebrae are very robust, and not fused unlike those of desmatosuchians. There are only two sacral vertebrae. The caudal vertebrae number at least seventeen, with very tall neural spines (taller than the centrum is) and low-attached caudal ribs. The holotype had all seventeen of the first caudal vertebrae articulated.

Several pelvic girdles are known, with ventral acetabula and thickened peduncles. The iliac blades are short, but very broad. The ischia are short and quite curved, with thickened areas and rugosities near the ends. Much of the pubis is slender, but the distal end expands until it is quite broad. The femur is gracile, or more so than Desmatosuchus, and has a pronounced crescent-shaped ridge near the proximal end. In a similar fashion, the tibia is also quite gracile and shorter than the femur. The distal end bears a deep groove for articulation with the ankle bones.

== Classification ==
Calyptosuchus was named by Long and Ballew (1985) on the basis of UMMP 13950, a partial carapace with a vertebral column and pelvis that had been discovered in the Tecovas Formation of western Texas in 1931 by Ermin Cowles Case, who only went as far to assign the specimen to Phytosauria in a 1932 paper. Although publications in the 1990s and early 2000s treated the genus as a junior synonym of Stagonolepis, recent work has found it generically distinct from Stagonolepis proper. This is because more material from the same species has been discovered, including a dentary bone, a possible maxilla, and further vertebrae from the neck and trunk. A femur, tibia, and additional osteoderms have also been found.
