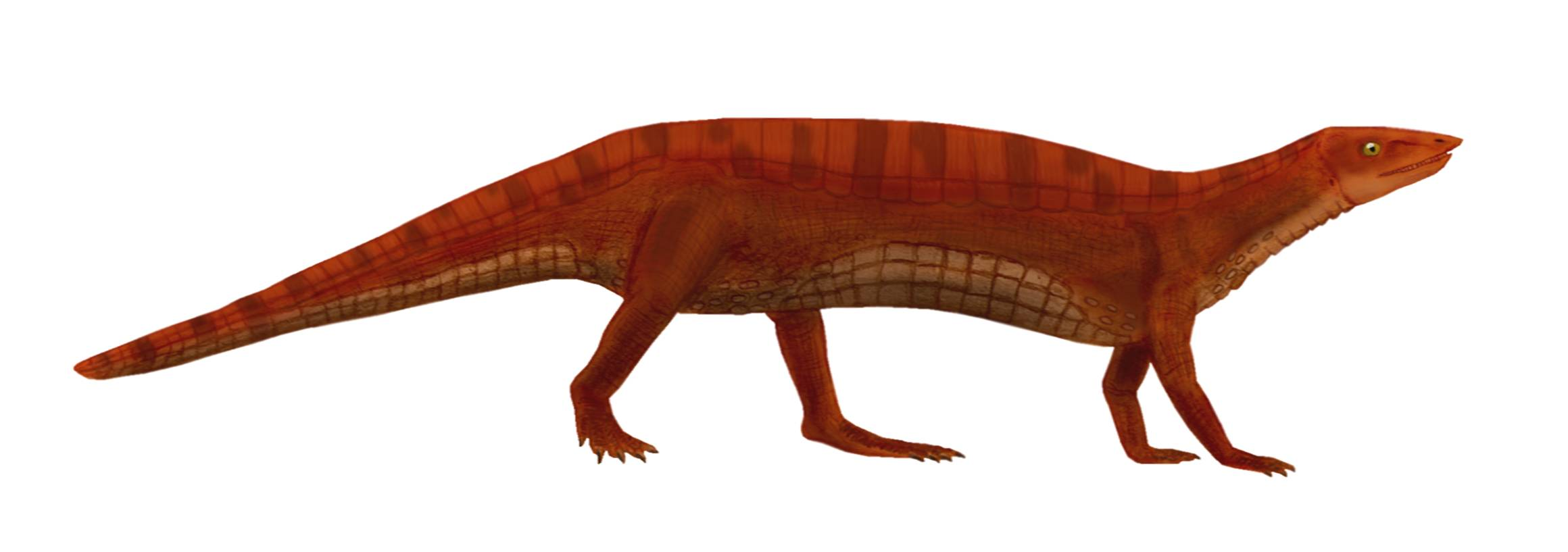

Scientific classification
- Domain: Eukaryota
- Kingdom: Animalia
- Phylum: Chordata
- Class: Reptilia
- Clade: Archosauria
- Clade: Pseudosuchia
- Order: †Aetosauria
- Family: †Stagonolepididae
- Genus: †Neoaetosauroides; Bonaparte 1969

Species
- †N. engaeus Bonaparte 1969 (type)

= Neoaetosauroides =

Neoaetosauroides Temporal range: Norian

Extinct genus of reptiles

Neoaetosauroides is an extinct genus of primitive aetosaur. Its type and only species is N. engaeus. Fossils have been found in Los Colorados Formation outcropping along the Sierra Morada River in the Ischigualasto-Villa Unión Basin in La Rioja, Argentina, and date back to the Norian age of the Late Triassic. It was the first aetosaur known from the formation, with remains being discovered in the 1960s.

== Description ==
Diagram showing Neoaetosauroides osteoderms with labeled terminology

The genus is one of the most well represented aetosaurs from South America, with some specimens being fully articulated. Two rows of dorsal osteoderms run paramedially along either side of the spine. Ventral osteoderms were also present. Unlike most other aetosaurs, the fourth finger was longer than the second and third. Additionally, the number of phalanges in the fifth digit was lower than other aetosaurs. The upper tooth row of Neoaetosauroides runs anteriorly to the tip of the elongated snout, evidence that is incompatible with the theory of a keratinous beak proposed for other aetosaurs.

== Paleobiology ==
Biomechanical studies and muscle reconstructions of the skull of Neoaetosauroides have shown that it likely had a diet which diverged greatly from most other aetosaurs. While most aetosaurs had very strong jaw muscles which were nevertheless incapable of snapping shut quickly, Neoaetosauroides had somewhat weaker yet faster jaws. Quick jaw movement is sometimes utilized by herbivores for cropping plant material, but is more commonly associated with carnivory, as it allows small animals to be caught more easily. While Neoaetosauroides lacks the large, fang-like teeth present in specialized carnivorous reptiles, it also lacks many traits consistent with herbivory, such as a beak or dental wear facets. It was therefore proposed that Neoaetosauroides may have had a generalized diet of soft-bodied colonial insects, supplemented by small vertebrates. This diet is similar to that of modern armadillos and pangolins, which also have a similar body shape to Neoaetosauroides.
