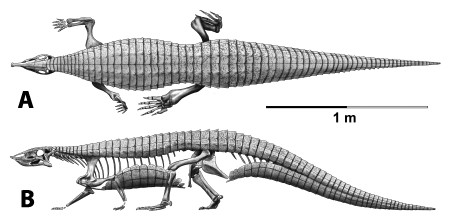
- Skeletal restorations of S. robertsoni

Scientific classification
- Kingdom: Animalia
- Phylum: Chordata
- Class: Reptilia
- Clade: Archosauria
- Clade: Pseudosuchia
- Order: †Aetosauria
- Family: †Stagonolepididae
- Genus: †Stagonolepis; Agassiz 1844

Species
- †S. robertsoni Agassiz 1844 (type); †S. olenkae Sulej 2010

= Stagonolepis =

Stagonolepis Temporal range: Carnian ~221–206 Ma

Extinct genus of reptiles

Stagonolepis is an extinct genus of stagonolepidid aetosaur known from the Late Triassic (Carnian stage) Hassberge Formation of Germany, the Drawno Beds of Poland, and the Lossiemouth Sandstone of Scotland. Supposed fossils from North and South America have been placed into their own genera, Calyptosuchus and Aetosauroides, respectively.

== Description ==
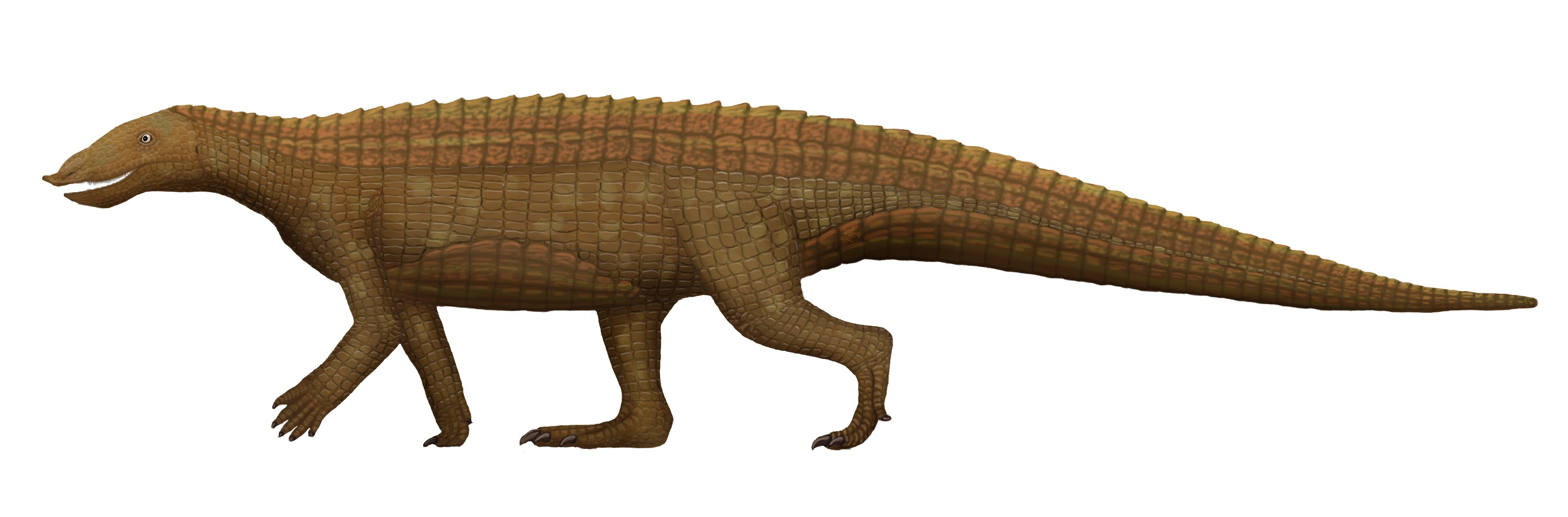
Restoration of S. robertsoni

Stagonolepis robertsoni was about 3 metres (10 ft) long. It was a quadrupedal animal covered in thick armoured scales that ran down the length of its body. A slow-moving browser, it would have used this heavy body armour to repel attacks from contemporary archosauriform carnivores. Stagonolepis had a very small head for its size; it was only 25 centimetres (10 in), accounting for less than 10% of the total body length. It had no teeth in the front of its jaws, but instead had a beak-like tip that arched upwards. This would have allowed it to uproot plants in a similar manner to a modern pig. The peg-like teeth at the back of its mouth would have been suitable for chewing tough vegetation, including horsetails, ferns, and the newly evolved cycads.

A 2018 paper suggested that Stagonolepis olenkae's forelimb morphology is an adaptation for scratch-digging. According to paleontologist Dawid Dróżdż, "S. olenkae might have used its robust forelimbs to break through the compacted soil with its claws and proceed to dig in search of food in softened substrate with the shovel-like expansion at the tip of its snout."

== Species ==
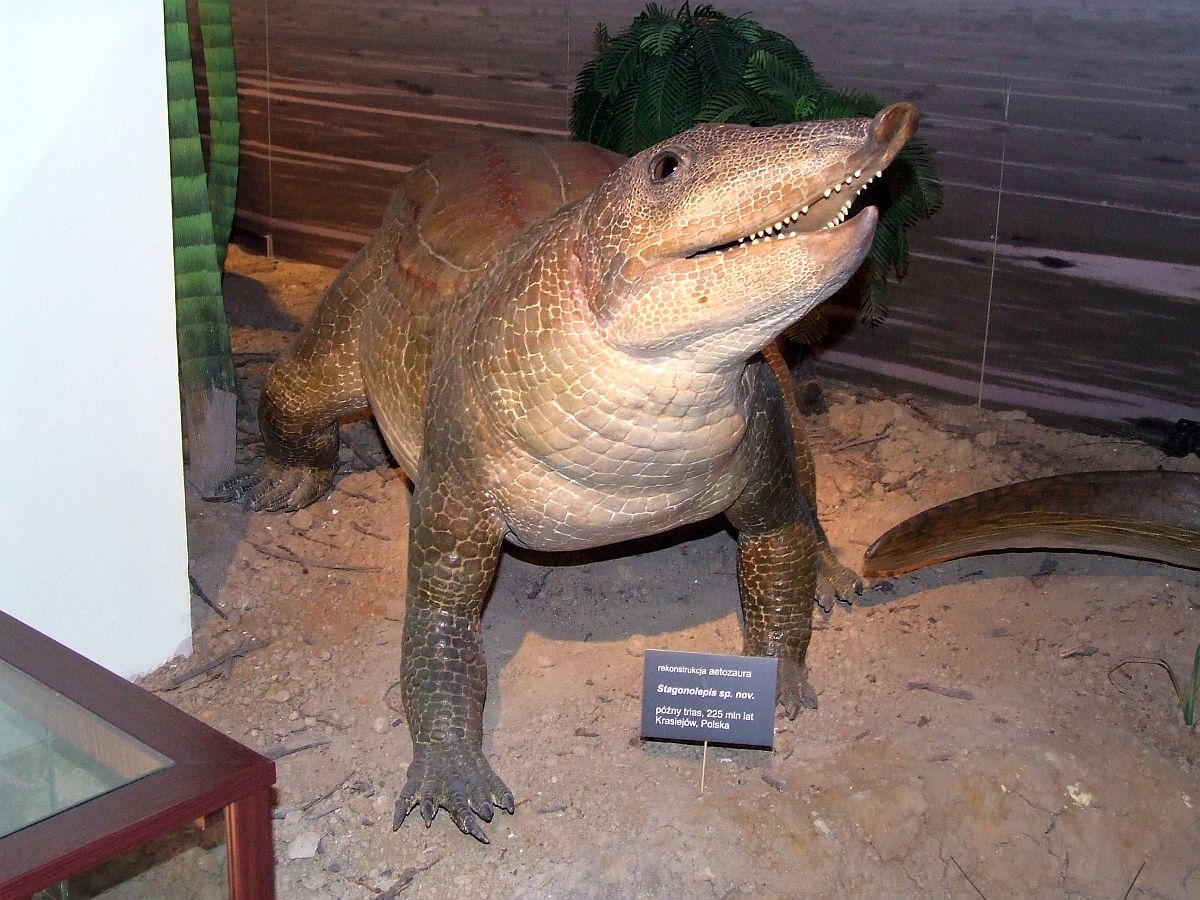
Model of S. olenkae at the Museum of Evolution Warsaw

Fossil remains of S. robertsoni have been found in Lossiemouth Sandstone of Scotland, while S. olenkae is known from deposits near Krasiejów, Poland. S. olenkae is stratigraphically younger than the type species S. robertsoni, although it is questioned by some researchers and described as an example of intraspecific variety (e. g. sexual dimorphism). The genus Aetosauroides from South America has been considered a junior synonym of Stagonolepis by some paleontologists. Two species of Aetosauroides were named, A. scagliai and A. subsulcatus. In 2002, Andrew B. Heckert and Spencer G. Lucas proposed that smaller specimens of both species belong to Stagonolepis robertsoni, and larger specimens to S. wellesi. S. wellesi itself was originally named Calyptosuchus, a stagonolepidid from the Late Triassic Dockum Group of the United States, which was considered to be a species of Stagonolepis by Murray & Long in 1989. However, most of the sequential studies conclude that both Aetosauroides and Calyptosuchus are valid and monotypic genera, the former occurs only in South America and the latter only in the United States. Stagonolepis is restricted to the Carnian stage of Scotland and Poland.
