= Hartley Mammoth Site =

Pre-Clovis archeological site in New Mexico

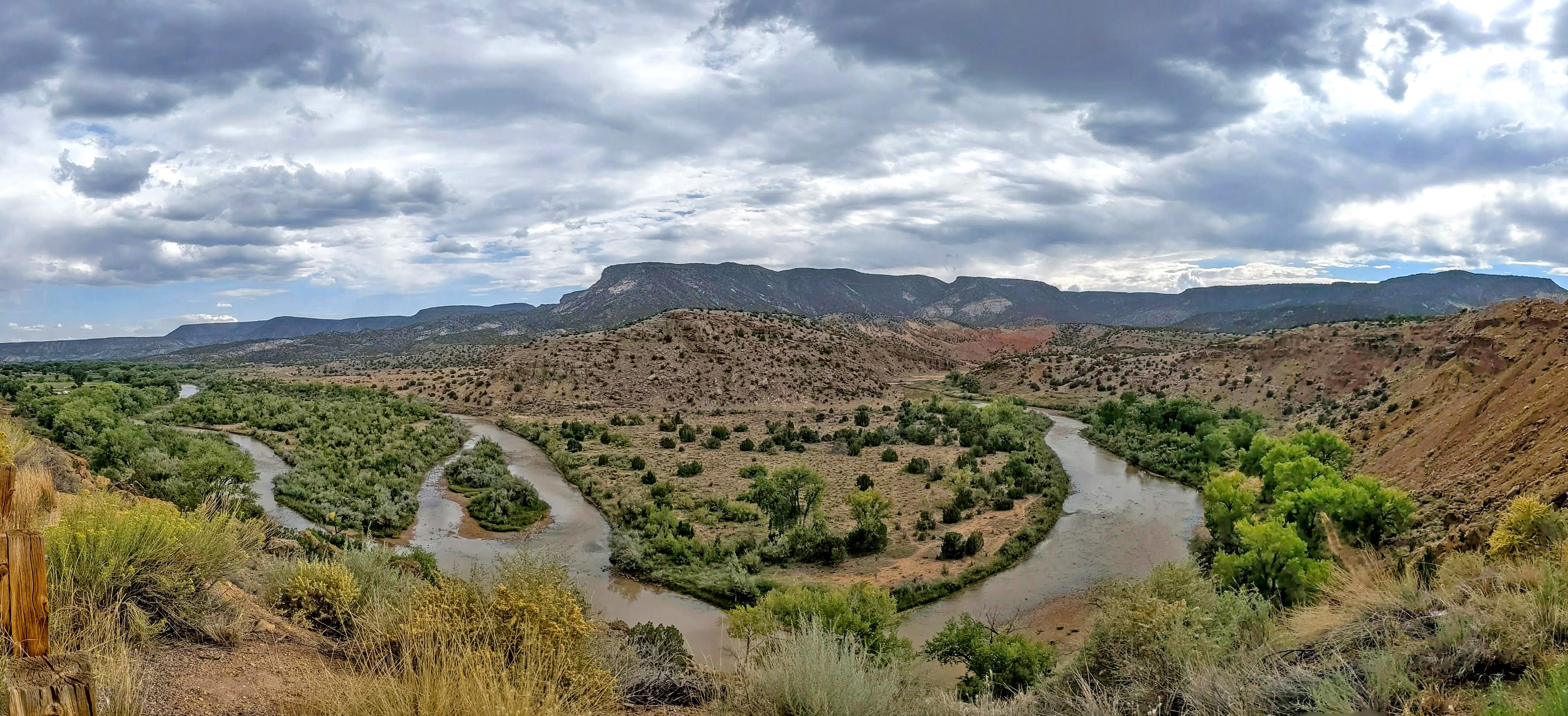
- Chama river basin near Abiquiu

- Shown within New Mexico
- 36°14′45″N 106°32′0″W
- Type: open-air
- Location: Rio Puerco Canyon, near Abiquiu Lake
- Region: Colorado Plateau

Site notes
- Elevation: 1,970 m (6,460 ft)

The Hartley Mammoth Site is a pre-Clovis archaeological and paleontological site in New Mexico. Preserving the butchered remains of two Columbian mammoths, small mammals and fish, the site is notable due to its age (~37,500 BP), which is significantly older than the currently accepted dates for the settlement of the Americas.

== Locality ==
Situated on the south-eastern corner of the Colorado Plateau, the Hartley Mammoth Site lies on the canyon of the Rio Puerco, which flows into the Abiquiu Lake. Both the river and lake belong to the Chama basin of northern New Mexico. The slope's steepness (~19°) and abundance of sandstone boulders indicates a dynamic environment, discouraging soil formation. This dynamic environment is also evidenced in the poor sorting of sediment grain size. The site is located in a small (1.5 m) alluvial channel, formed in the depression of a block of Triassic sandstone (Poleo Formation) slumped over weaker mudstone (Salitral Formation), possibly exacerbated due to the wetter conditions and increased snowmelt of the Late Pleistocene. The Rio Puerco canyon represents around 150,000 years of erosion. The steepness of the slope and nature of the channel was noted as being unusual for a mammoth burial. The site today is of a semi-arid climate, and is occupied by piñon-juniper woodland.

== Excavations ==
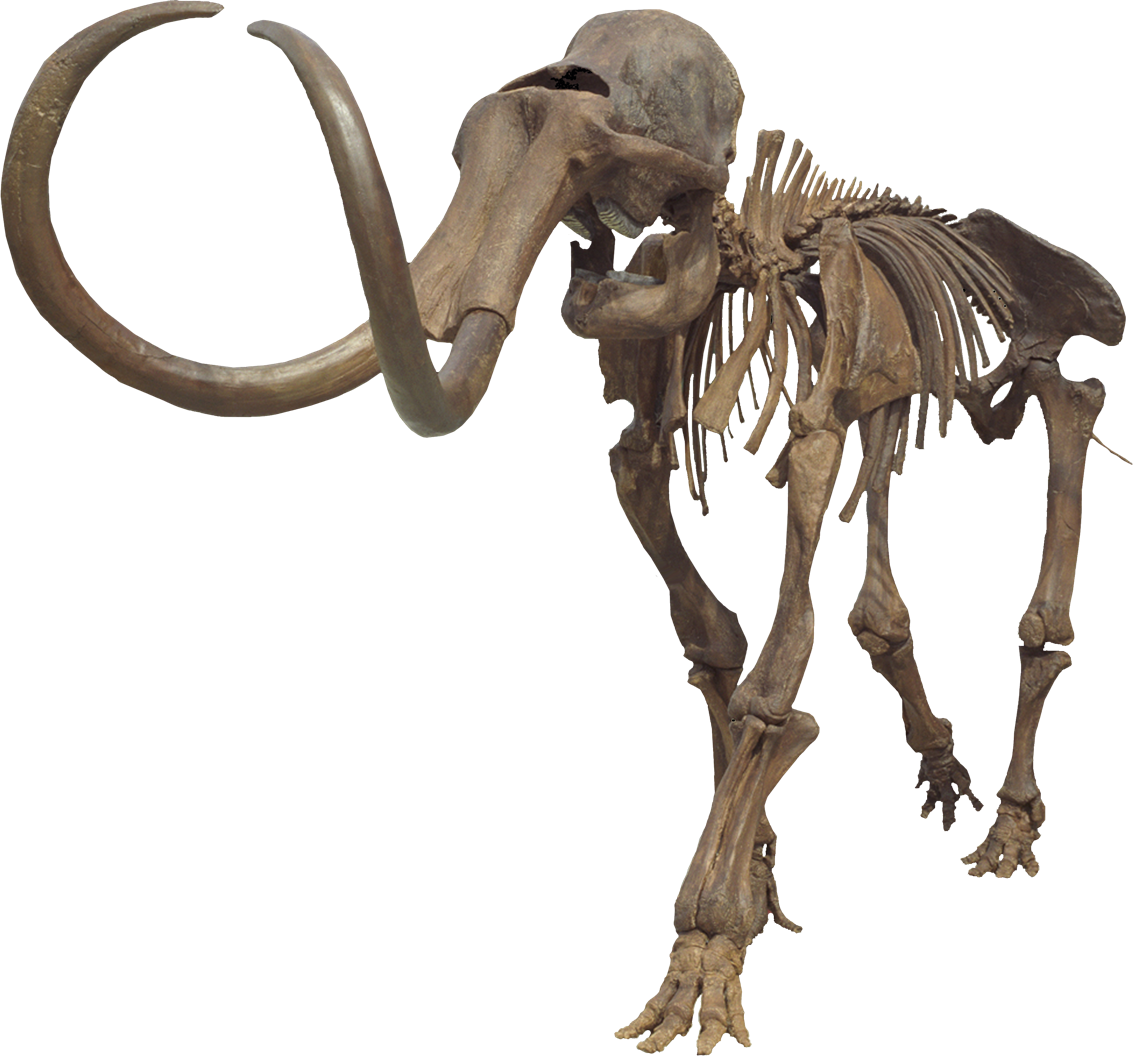

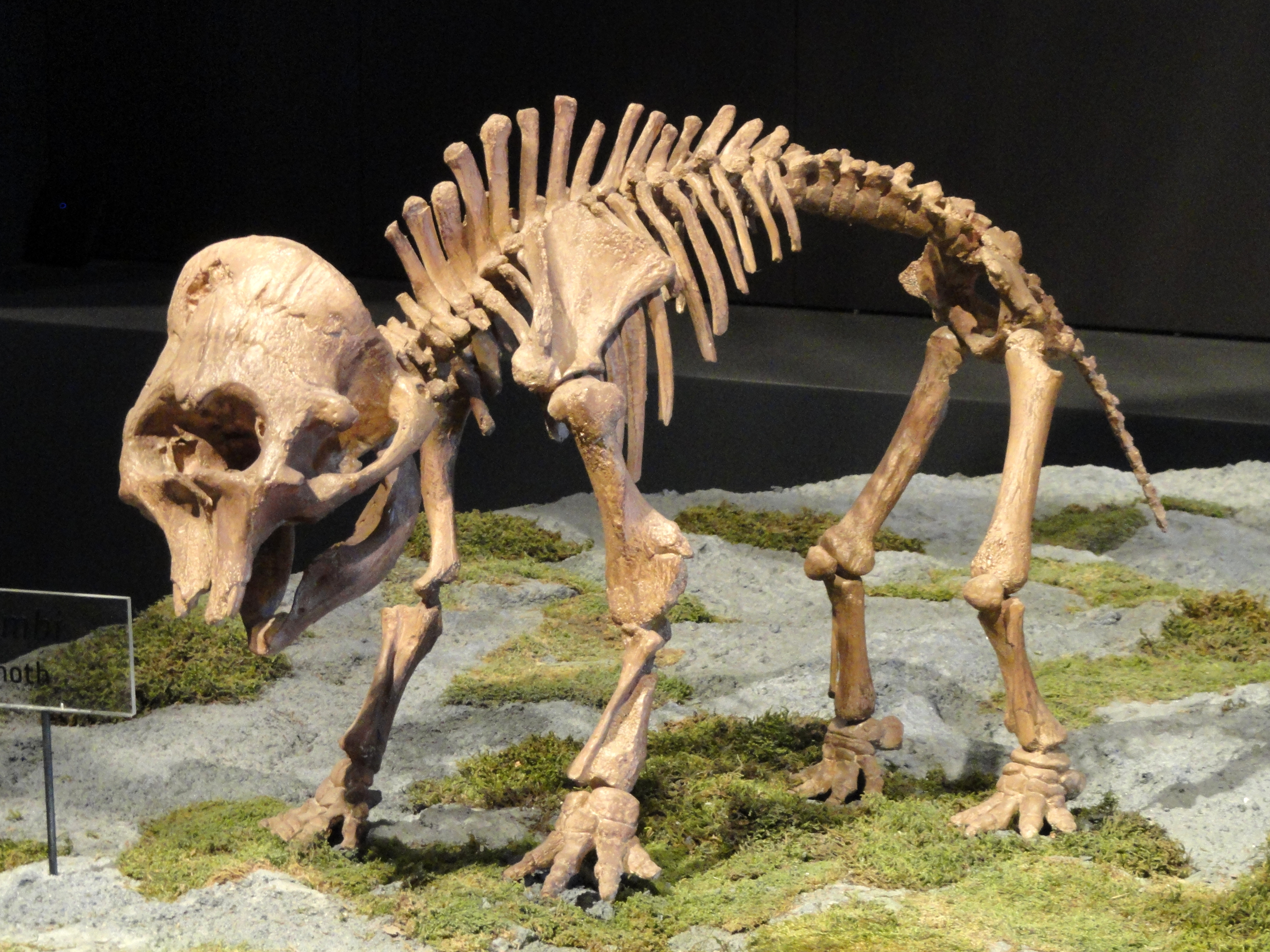
Skeletons of an adult and baby Columbian mammoth.

The site was discovered on Tim Rowe's property by Gary Hartley in 2013, while he was on a hike. On the surface was a tusk, three ribs, a broken dentary, a heavily reworked obsidian Clovis projectile point, and scattered lithic debitage of pedernal chert and obsidian. Upon excavation, the skeletons of two Columbian mammoths, a young female adult and a calf, were uncovered. The bones were primarily excavated by archeologists from the University of New Mexico, then catalogued for further study at the University of Texas, Austin. The expedition was led by Bruce Huckell, Tim Rowe, Leslie McFadden, and Grant Meyer.

The Hartley Mammoth Site is one of 87 mammoth sites in New Mexico, with the closest other site nearby, at the La Chama river. The Hartley Mammoth Site is unique, as the mammoths were fully buried, and remained in a stable depositional environment. Most mammoth specimens, in contrast, are poorly fossilized.

Initially, there was debate as to whether the site was purely paleontological or archeological. Due to a Clovis point recovered nearby, the site was then believed to be a Clovis butchery site, rapidly buried by a debris flow. However, further examinations by a 2022 study using both established and new techniques for a pre-Columbian archeological site, along with radiocarbon dating, led to the conclusion that Clovis point and mammoths were not contemporaneous. Below the exposed tusk and ribs were the disarticulated, intermingled partial skeletons of a young-adult female mammoth (95% of the remains) and a young calf, mostly piled in a meter-thick concentration of broken bones and large cobbles. In total, the adult is represented by 44 broken cranial fragments, an intact upper right second molar and 12 isolated tooth plates, 25 ribs broken into 52 fragments, 3 vertebrae and 15 vertebral fragments, 32 percussion-impact bone flakes, 9 butterfly fragments, 20 unidentifiable bone fragments, and 267 bags of small ‘bone scraps’, whereas the calf's remains are composed of a partial left maxilla and dentary with intact dentitions, three isolated tooth plates, left tibia diaphysis, and 10 rib fragments. In the midst of the pile, lying on top of four broken ribs, was a 23.7 kg boulder interpreted as a hammerstone and/or anvil. The excavations took place at 5 cm intervals, to ensure accuracy.

Although the adult's face and tusks were stacked on top, 88% of the larger (>5 cm) bones and bone fragments in the main accumulation were buried in the lower two-thirds of the excavation. Also recovered were six chert microflakes, the only excavated lithic remains, preserving evidence of percussion flaking. That two adult vertebral epiphyses remained in articulation with each other suggests that they were held together by an intact joint capsule at time of burial, one of many indications that burial was rapid.

== Bone modification ==
=== Assemblage ===
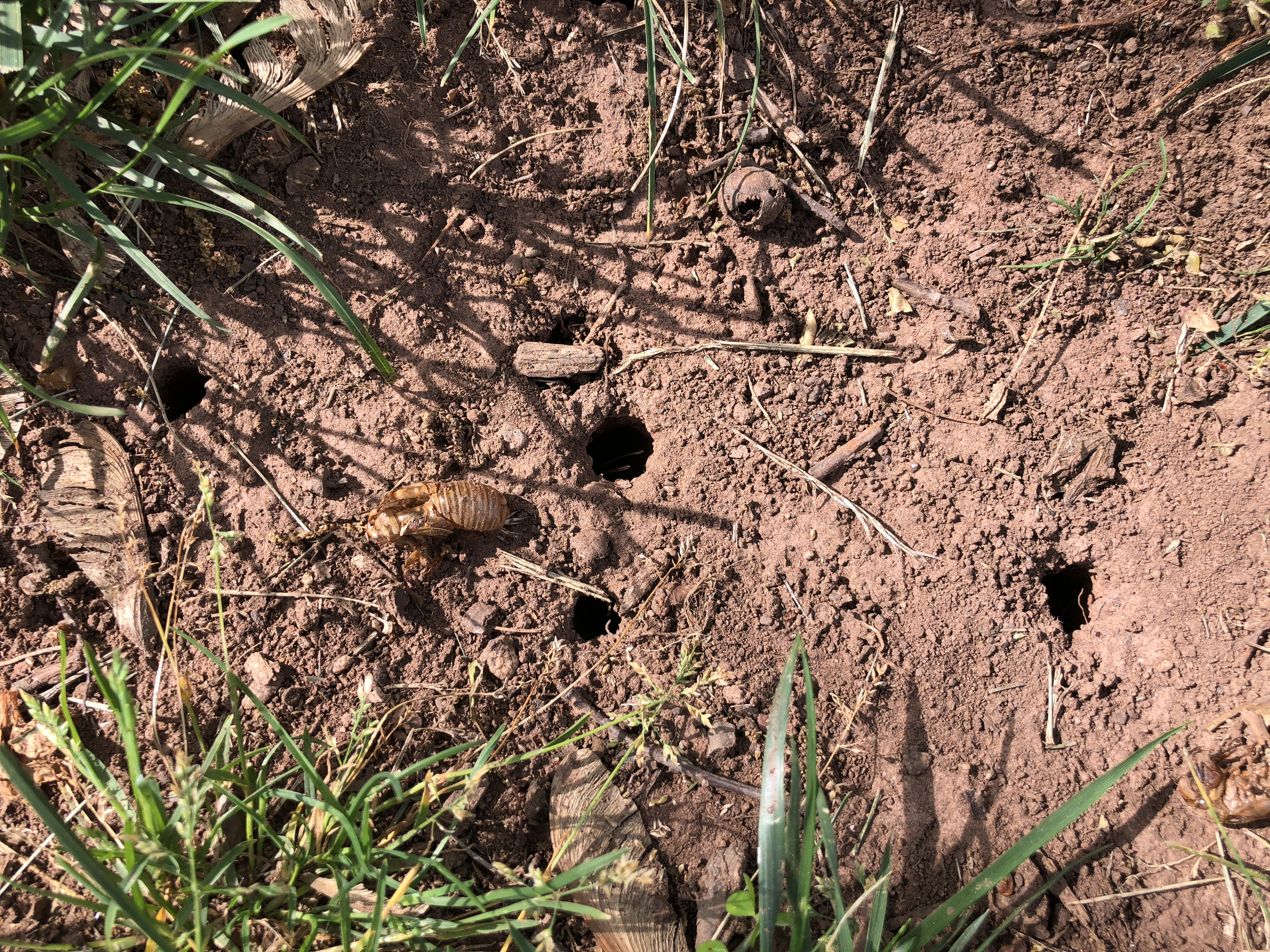
Cicada burrows account for the majority of insect damage to the bones.

Almost every bone displays damage from near or during time of death. Additionally, the bones exhibit little evidence of damage of carnivore scavenging, weather, hydrologic abrasion, or sediment loading. Although some of the bones preserved post-mortem insect burrowing, none of the potential non-anthropogenic causes accounted for the intensive and systematic bone breakage, or the stacking of the bone assemblage. One diagnostic evidence of butchering found came from the processing of the left shoulder blade to transport the infraspinatus muscle. Apart from some fragments, limb elements are noticeably absent- opening the possibility that humans may have removed the limbs from the site for later consumption.

==== Skull ====
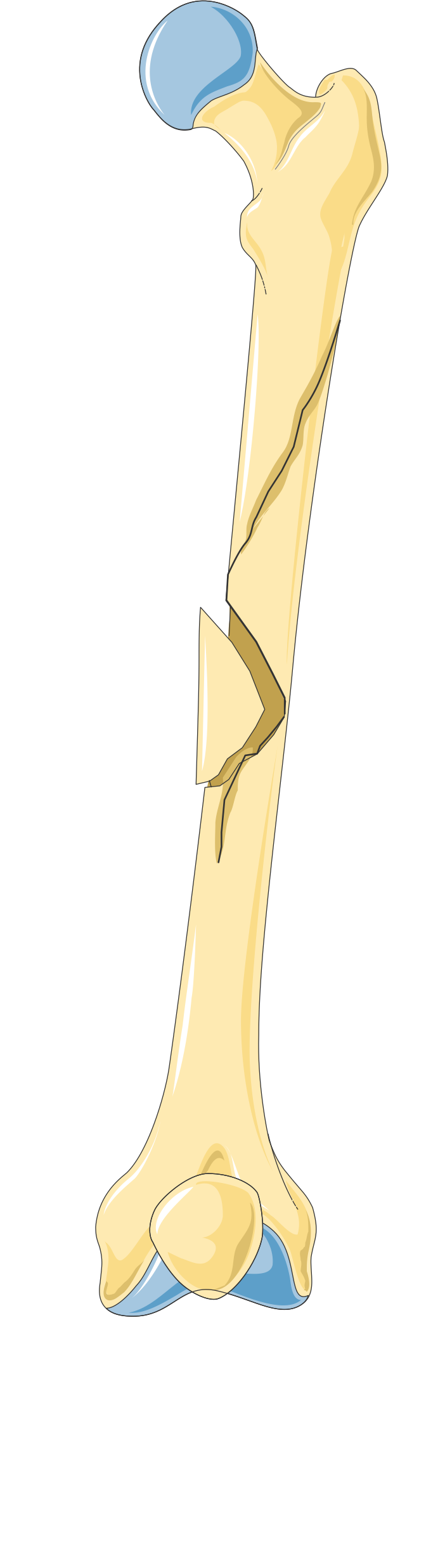
An example of a spiral fracture.

The adult's face (tusks, premaxillae, and partial maxillae), positioned on top of the bone pile, was sheared from the cranium at the nostrils. The face was separated from the cranium by a profound skull fracture, followed by the breakage of the skull from repeated dorsal impacts. On the dorsal side, large-diameter punctures occur in a cluster, with small-diameter punctures also perforating the dorsal surface of the frontal bone, and two penetrating the orbital wall, entering obliquely from above. Proboscidean skulls are commonly fragmented in archeological sites to gain access to the brain and other soft tissues.

==== Ribs ====
All proximal and distal ends exhibited perimortem damage, including detachment, circular punctures/gouges, blunt-force impact fractures, and spiral fractures, indicating they were fresh when fractured. Short, broad, parallel chop marks on one rib are consistent with expedient tools. This damage suggests systematic rib detachment from the vertebral column, costal cartilages, sternum, and from other ribs using cylindrical rods and expedient cutting and chopping tools. Similar highly patterned carcass processing sequences are similar to other butchered proboscideans from the Lower Paleolithic of Afro-Eurasia.

=== Punctures and fat rendering ===
The adult frontal bone, 23 postcranial elements, and a calf tibia preserve circular cross-section punctures ~2 mm to ~1 cm in diameter. Detached surficial bone fragments were also found displaced up to 15 mm into the diplöe. The locations and 3D geometries of these punctures are entirely inconsistent with carnivore canine marks. Instead they suggest an insertion and rotation of a pointed tool that disrupted the trabeculae, facilitating extraction of grease from the interior of bone, and to retrieve pedal fat pads. The presence of "bone scraps", likely from the crushing and boiling of the medullary bone, is a classic sign of the rendering of animal fat. Similarly, in the vertebra, the detachment of the epiphyses from the centra, and punctures penetrating 45mm into the centra, are also thought to facilitate the extraction of lipids.

=== Bone flakes ===
The Hartley Mammoth site preserves a high number of bone flakes. Although bone flakes are sometimes formed due to weathering or scavenging, that the vast majority of the Hartley bone flakes were struck either perpendicular or parallel to the grain of their parent bone points to an anthropogenic origin. 47% of the flakes (15/32) have sharp edges suitable for cutting. The Hartley Mammoth site preserves a continuum in flakes sizes, including microflakes. High impact knapping tests on fresh bovine bones, resulting in arrested fractures, mimicked bone flakes from the Hartley Mammoth site and the Riley mammoth from Michigan.

=== Butterfly fragments ===
Butterfly fragments result from medium to high velocity impact to long bones or ribs, by blows perpendicular to the grain of the parent bone. Five butterfly fragments on the Hartley mammoth were derived from limb elements, and four from ribs. With rare exceptions, only humans are known to create butterfly fragments. 40% of the combined bone flakes and butterfly fragments preserve use-wear indicative of utilization as expedient tools. Similar bone flakes from other proboscidean butchery sites are described with compelling justification for interpreting them as percussion-flaked artifacts.

== Fire ==
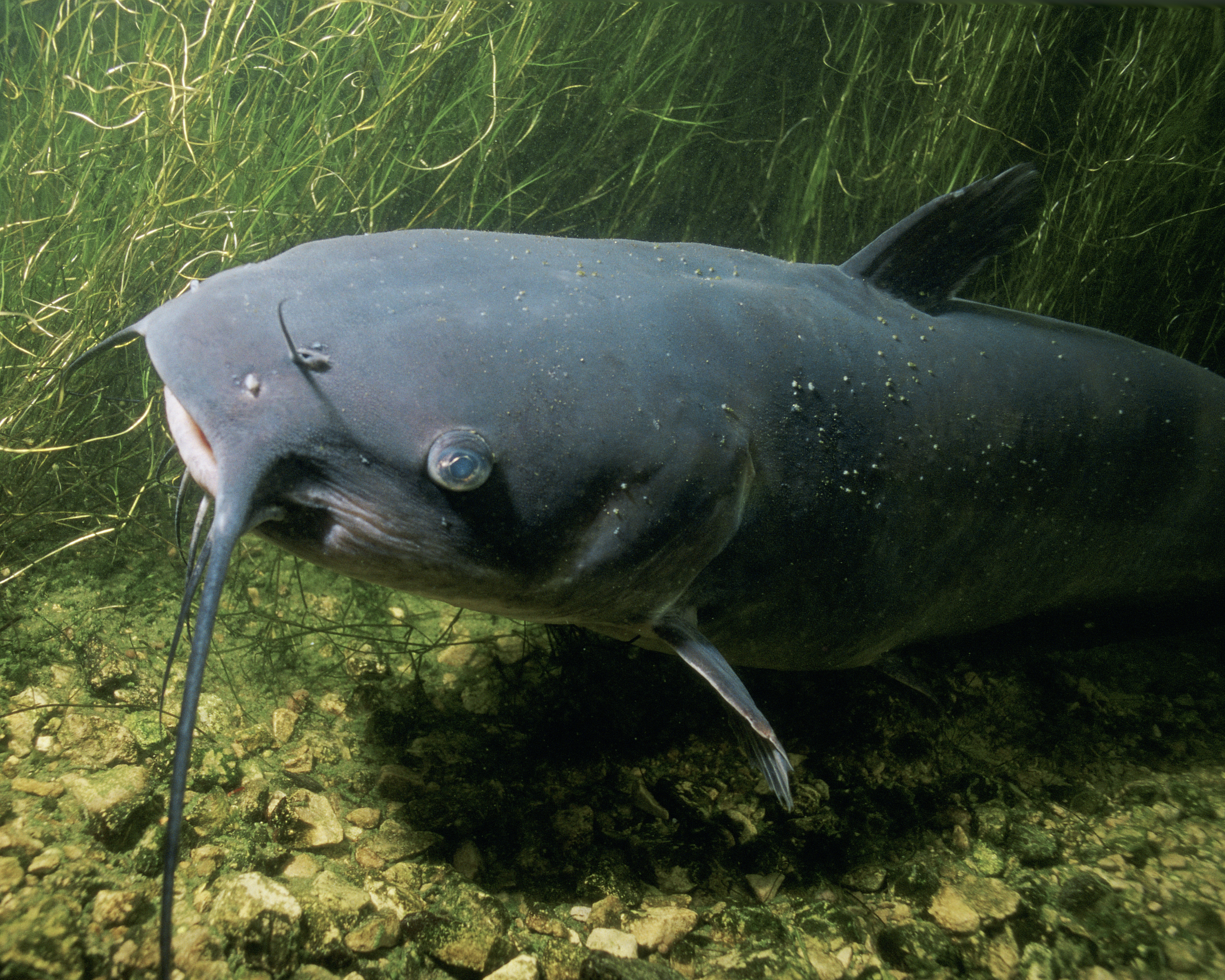
An indeterminate ictalurid spinal fragment (likely from a Channel catfish) was recovered from the burial pit.

Interspersed throughout the excavation were micro-particles created as a result of controlled fires fueled by burning wood, plant material, and bone. These particles include siliceous aggregates, recrystallized bone ash, pulverized bone fragments, shattered tooth and bone fragments, vitrified plant fragments, and charcoal fragments. The presence of lime mortar indicates that some parts of the fire were heated to temperatures exceeding 700 °C. These particles, along with pulverized bone and tooth fragments, are also ubiquitous in Afro-Eurasian archaeological hearths.

=== Small vertebrates ===
Excavations also recovered an assemblage of teeth fragments, fish scales, and rare intact disarticulated bones, including a rodent incisor. The fish scales are notable, as the site is ~70 m above the nearest river. The fish scales and calcined bone were also found cemented into the burnt micro-particles, indicating that these tiny bones were not contaminants from packrat middens or raptor roosts. At the Hartley site, the concentrated biodiversity and different burning states of pulverized bone, fish scales and teeth, and mammal teeth also argue against natural wildfire or lightning, but instead most likely formed in a controlled fire.

== Paleoenvironment ==
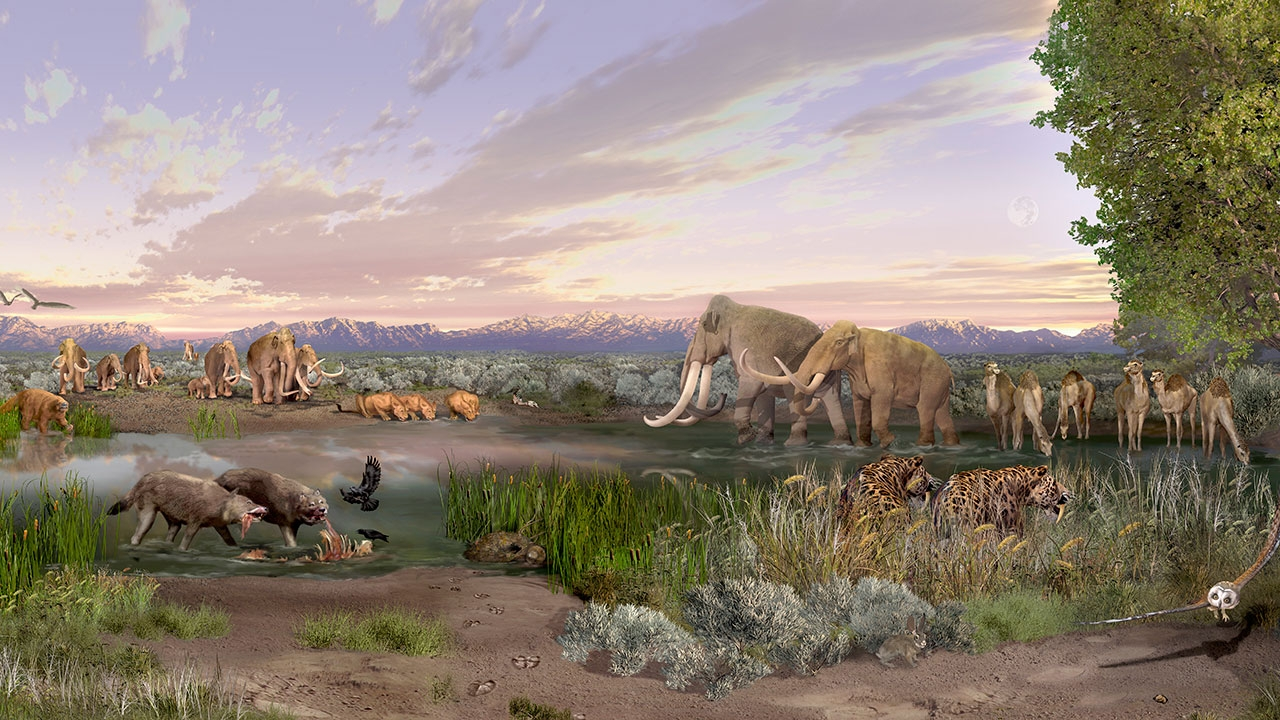
A reconstruction of Late Pleistocene New Mexico, at White Sands. White Sands is another notable Pre-Clovis archeological site.

At the time of burial, mean annual temperatures on the southern Colorado Plateau were estimated to be at least 5 °C cooler than today during this stage of the Late Pleistocene. Additionally, there were substantially wetter conditions in Late Pleistocene in the Intermontane Plateau. Greater moisture resulted in denser vegetation, with juniper, pinon-juniper and pinon-juniper-oak woodlands extending into currently unforested elevations, with supplementary evidence suggesting weaker vegetation zonation throughout mountain elevations. Additionally, snow accumulation and melt were likely much greater than present at the Hartley Mammoth site.

== Radiocarbon dating ==
Multiple radiocarbon dating of the bone collagen of a single adult ulna/tibia butterfly fragment (TMM 47004–1.40/SR-9067) yielded ages ranging from 38,900 to 32,300 cal BP. The most robust age was 32,750 ± 430 radiocarbon years ago, or ~37,500 BP. The oldest widely accepted dates of human occupation in North America south of the ice sheets are ~22,000 BP, from White Sands (also New Mexico).

This early date, along with technologies reminiscent of the Lower Paleolithic, courts controversy with conventional understandings of the settlement of the Americas. Although Upper Paleolithic stone tools, such as those from the Clovis culture, are often the standard for diagnosing cultural remains in North America, the narrow re-dating of sophisticated Clovis technologies to a 200 calendar year window (13,125 BP to 12,925 BP) suggests that criteria other than stone tools are needed to accurately assess human presence in prehistoric sites. For example, a similarly aged layer of the famous Monte Verde site in Chile, dated to ~33,000 BP preserves simple worked-stone implements and proboscidean bones in association with clay-lined hearth basins. The age of the Hartley Mammoth site, along with genomic and genetic evidence from across the Americas, suggests that two founding populations colonized the Americas.
