= El Cobre Canyon Formation =

Geologic formation in New Mexico, United States

- Stratigraphic range: late Pennsylvanian–early Permian
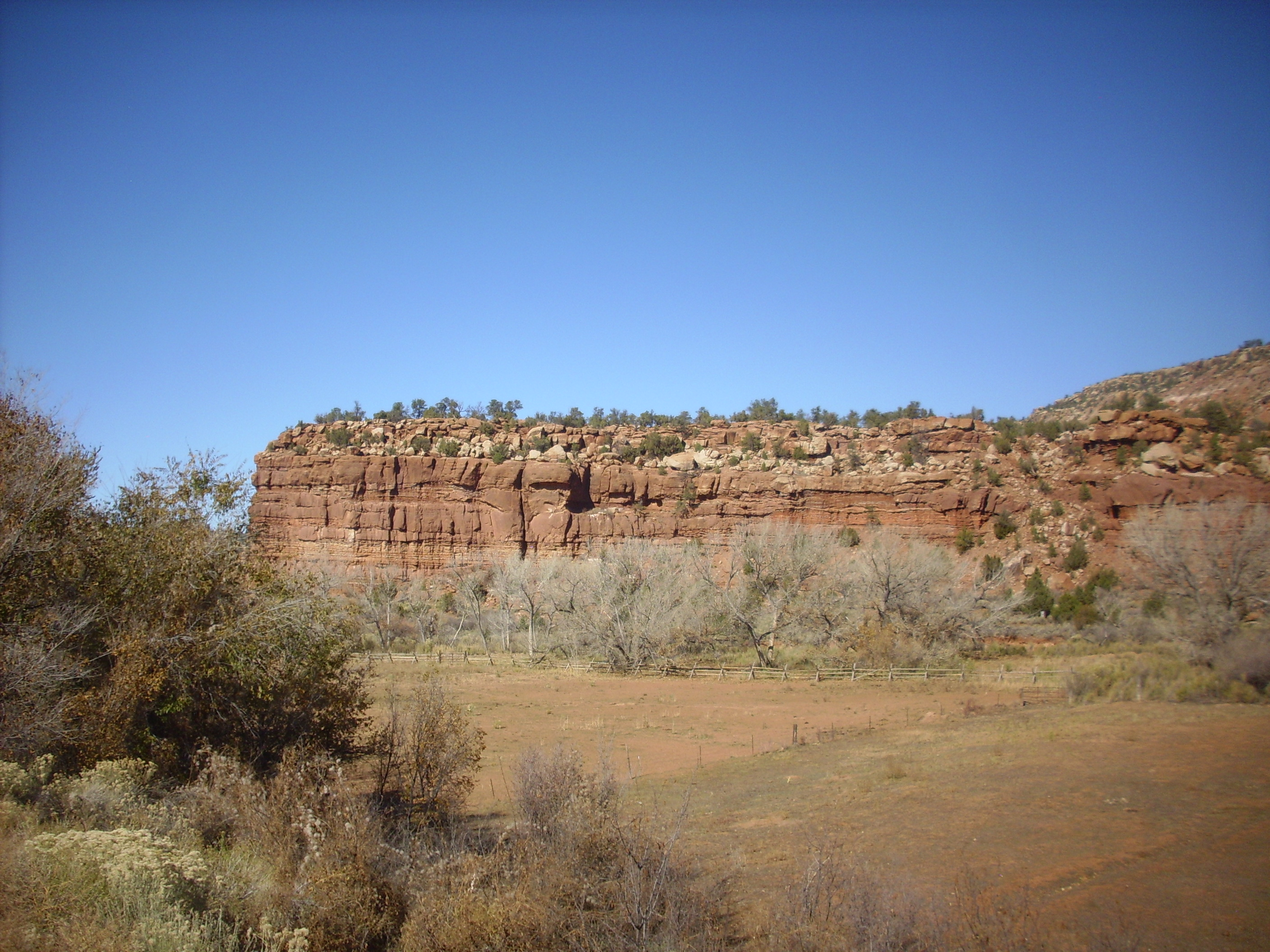
- El Cobre Canyon Formation near Arroyo Del Agua, New Mexico
- Type: Formation
- Unit of: Cutler Group
- Underlies: Arroyo del Agua Formation
- Overlies: Proterozoic basement
- Thickness: 111 m (364 ft)

Lithology
- Primary: Siltstone
- Other: Sandstone

Location
- Coordinates: 36.308044°N 106.353257°W
- Region: New Mexico
- Country: United States

Type section
- Named for: El Cobre Canyon
- Named by: Lucas and Krainer
- Year defined: 2005
- El Cobre Canyon Formation (the United States) El Cobre Canyon Formation (New Mexico)

The El Cobre Canyon Formation is a geologic formation in New Mexico. It preserves fossils dating back to the late Pennsylvanian to early Permian periods.

== Description ==
The El Cobre Canyon Formation consists of siliciclastic red beds with a total thickness of roughly 111 meters (364 feet). These lie on Proterozoic basement and are in turn overlain by the Arroyo del Agua Formation. At its type section, the formation is 66% siltstone and 21% sandstone, with minor conglomerate (9%) sandy shale (2%), and calcrete (1%). The beds are pale reddish brown in color, and can readily be distinguished from the orange beds of the overlying Arroyo del Agua Formation. The siltstone beds contain many rhizoliths, while the sandstone beds are coarse grained, arkosic, and micaceous, with trough crossbedding. The sandstones form thick cliffs and benches. The conglomerates are composed mostly of fragments of basement rock.

The formation correlates with the Atrasado Formation and lower Abo Formation to the south.

== Fossils ==
The El Cobre Canyon Formation contains some of the most extensive assemblages of early Permian fossil vertebrates in North America, which have been studied by numerous paleontologists from the 1870s onwards. S.W. Williston and E.C. Case determined in 1913 that the beds later assigned to the El Cobre Canyon Formation contained the Pennsylvanian brachiopod Spirifer rockymontanus and assigned an early Permian age based on the vertebrate fossil assemblages. These were correlated to the lower part of the Wichita Group. Wann Langston Jr. confirmed these findings in 1953, describing in detail several vertebrate fossil localities, including fossil amphibians, at Arroyo del Agua, and assigning an early Permian age to the El Cobre Canyon vertebrate fossil assemblages.

The lowermost beds of the El Cobre Formation in the floor of El Cobre Canyon include Alethopteris flora and the vertebrates Desmatodon and Limnoscelis. These suggest a later Pennsylvanian age. Fossils higher in the formation, such as Zatrachys, Eryops, Bolosaurus, and others, are typical of faunachron A of Lucas in the early Permian. Chenoprosopus has also been found in the beds.

The fossil quarries near Loma Salazar provided the first specimens of eothyridid Oedaleops campi, the varanopid Aerosaurus wellesi, the diadectomorph Limnosceloides brachycoles, and the captorhinid Rhiodenticulatus heatoni. They also yielded an excellent skull specimen of Sphenacodon ferocior. Further excavation from 1985 on identified the rare dissorophid temnospondyl Ecolsonia cutlerensis, the diadectomorph Tseajaia cf. T. campi, the araeoscelid Zarcasaurus tanyderus, the seymouriamorph Seymouria sanjuanensis, the microsaur Stegotretus agyrus and the varanopid Eoscansor cobrensis.

== History of investigation ==
The fossil beds of the Cutler Formation in the Chama Basin have been well studied for its fossil fauna since the Macomb expedition of 1858. David Baldwin collected from sites in the Arroyo del Agua area for five field seasons between 1877 and 1881, working first for O.C. Marsh and later for Marsh's bitter rival E.D. Cope. The Baldwin bonebed yielded the first Permian vertebrates discovered in New Mexico. However, Baldwin failed to elicit much interest from either Marsh or Cope.

The sites were periodically revisited beginning in 1911, when a field party from University of Chicago led by S.W. Williston reexamined Baldwin's quarry. They traced the fossil horizon southeast along Mesa Montosa (then known as Mesa Poleo) and discovered the Miller bone bed. This was followed up by field parties from University of California, Berkeley in 1928 led by C.L. Camp and V.L.VanderHoof, who each discovered new fossil quarries now bearing their names. Fossil excavations continued in 1934 and 1935, when the Welles, Anderson, and Quarry Butte quarries were discovered close to Loma Salazar. These yielded important pelycosaur fossils.

The final phase of collection began in 1979 and was carried out by joint field crews from the Carnegie Museum of Natural History and the University of Toronto. These discovered the Cardillo quarry near Loma Salazar and the Morfin bone bed on the southwest flank of Mesa Montosa. Collecting continued until the mid-1980s. From 2002 to 2004, a joint field crew from the New Mexico Museum of Natural History and Science and the Carnegie Museum of Natural History reopened the Cardillo quarry and resumed excavation.

However, the lithology of the Cutler Formation in the Chama Basin was long neglected. Darton mapped the Permian redbeds of the Chama Basin as Abo Formation in 1928. In 1946, Wood and Northrop mapped the Pennsylvanian-Permian red beds north of latitude 36 degrees as Cutler Formation and south of that latitude as Abo Formation. It was not until 2005 that the lithology of these beds was well enough characterized for it to be raised to group rank and divided into the lower El Cobre Canyon Formation and upper Arroyo del Agua Formation by Lucas and Krainer in 2005.

== See also ==
- List of fossiliferous stratigraphic units in New Mexico
- Paleontology in New Mexico
