= Halgaitosaurus =

Halgaitosaurus Temporal range: Latest Pennsylvanian (Gzhelian)

Scientific classification
- Domain: Eukaryota
- Kingdom: Animalia
- Phylum: Chordata
- Class: Reptilia
- Order: †Araeoscelidia
- Genus: †Halgaitosaurus
- Species: †H. gregarius

Binomial name
- †Halgaitosaurus gregarius Henrici et al., 2023

Genus of Permian reptile

Halgaitosaurus is an extinct genus of araeoscelidian reptile from the late Pennsylvanian of Utah. It contains a single species, Halgaitosaurus gregarius, which is known from the "Virgilian" (Gzhelian)-age Halgaito Formation in Bears Ears National Monument. The fossils of Halgaitosaurus include a number of partial skeletons and isolated bones discovered in blocks of siltstone collected from the Birthday Quarry, a multi-taxon bonebed in Valley of the Gods. Halgaitosaurus makes up about 55% of the fossil material in the 20 blocks recovered from the site. Its fossils show a wide range of body sizes, and their preservation in close company may indicate that it was a gregarious animal, hence the species name.

Halgaitosaurus shows many features in common with araeoscelidians. The cervical (neck) vertebrae are elongated, and all vertebrae in front of the hip have a midline keel on the underside. Moreover, the front edge of the scapula slants backwards, the limbs are long and roughly equal in length, and the femur is much thicker than the humerus. The coracoid has a prominent thumb-like attachment point for the triceps muscle, a trait shared by Araeoscelis. There were eight cervical vertebrae, less than Araeoscelis (9) but more than Petrolacosaurus (6). The maxilla has about 25 teeth, more than Araeoscelis (19) but less than Petrolacosaurus (35). The fourth and fifth teeth in the maxilla are caniform (enlarged and fang-like), while teeth 10-18 are also slightly larger than adjacent parts of the tooth row.

The frontals are similar to Araeoscelis, meeting together as a V-shaped projection wedging between the nasals. Unlike Araeoscelis, Halgaitosaurus may have had two temporal fenestrae. Excavations on the edges of the postorbital and parietal strongly suggest the presence of an upper temporal fenestra, visible from above. Likewise, the postorbital is proportionally similar to Petrolaceosaurus and the jugal has a right-angled rear edge, both of which may indicate that it had a lower temporal fenestra on the side of the skull. The jugal barely meets the lower edge of the skull, in contrast to other araeoscelidians.
