= Salitral Creek =

Tributary stream in Rio Arriba County, New Mexico

Salitral Creek, is a tributary stream of the Rio Puerco, in Rio Arriba County, New Mexico. Its mouth is located at its confluence with the Rio Puerco, below the populated place of Arroyo Del Agua, New Mexico at an elevation of 6,785 feet / 2,068 meters. Its source is at 36°09′49″N 106°47′05″W at an elevation of 8,800 feet, in the San Pedro Mountains. Salitral means in Spanish, "place where saltpeter [salitre] is found."
