= Chama Basin =

Geologic structural basin in New Mexico, US

Coordinates: 36.64°N 106.69°W

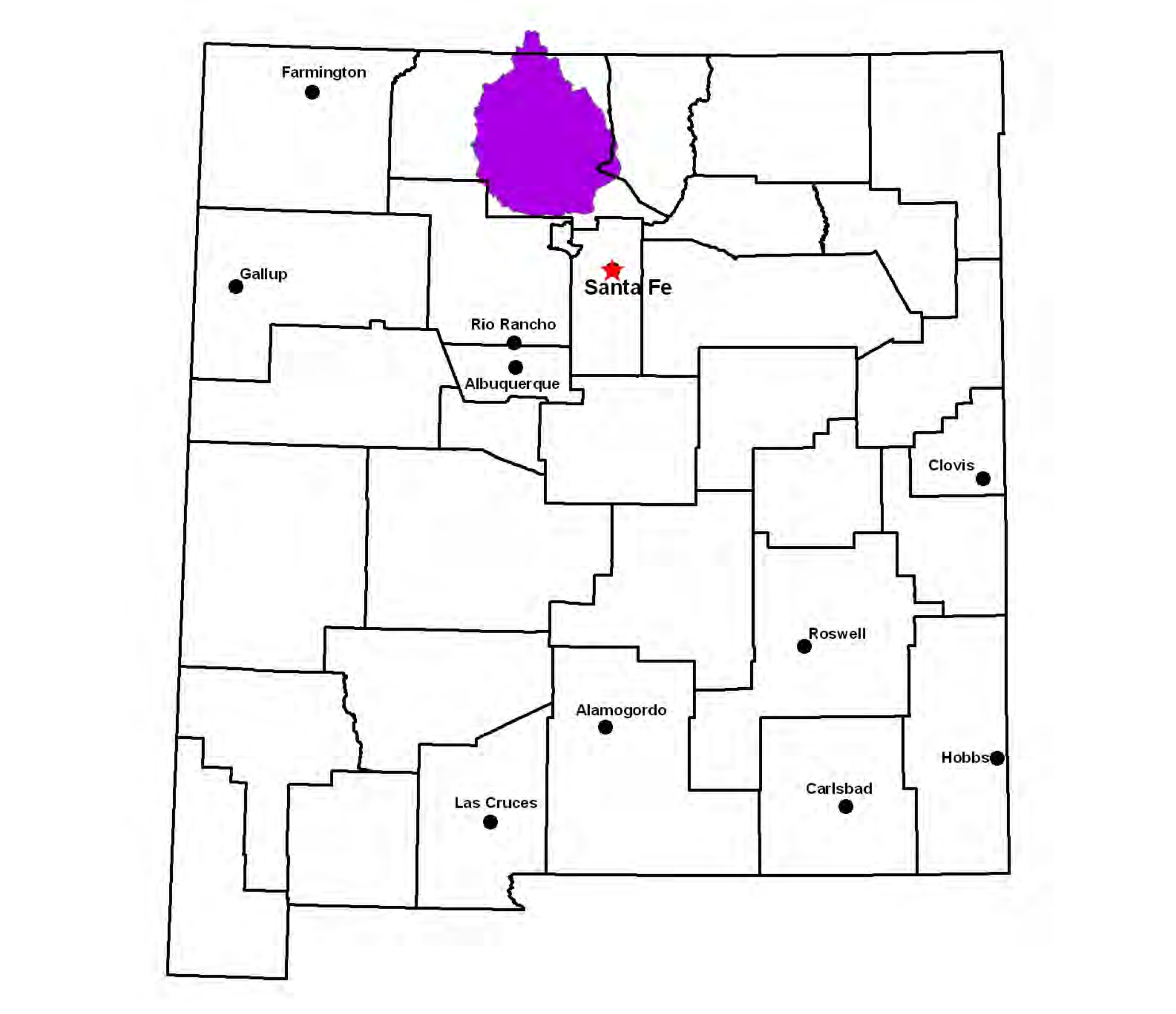
The Chama Basin is a small basin east of the San Juan Basin in northern New Mexico

The Chama Basin is a geologic structural basin located in northern New Mexico. The basin closely corresponds to the drainage basin of the Rio Chama and is located between the eastern margin of the San Juan Basin and the western margin of the Rio Grande Rift. Exposed in the basin is a thick and nearly level section of sedimentary rock of Permian to Cretaceous age, with some younger overlying volcanic rock. The basin has an area of about 3,144 square miles (8,140 km^{2}).

== Stratigraphy ==
In stratigraphic order (youngest to oldest), the stratigraphic units of the Chama Basin are:

Cretaceous

Graneros Shale Member, Mancos Shale
Twowells Sandstone Tongue, Dakota Formation
Whitewater Arroyo Shale Tongue, Mancos Shale
Paguate Sandstone Tongue, Dakota Formation
Clay Mesa Shale Tongue, Mancos Shale
Cubero Sandstone Tongue, Dakota Formation
Oak Canyon Member, Dakota Formation
Encinal Canyon Member, Dakota Formation

Jurassic

Burro Canyon Formation
Morrison Formation
Bluff Sandstone
Summerville Formation
Todilto Formation
Entrada Sandstone

Triassic

Chinle Group

Rock Point Formation
Petrified Forest Formation
Poleo Formation
Salitral Formation
Shinarump Formation
Zuni Mountains Formation

Permian

Cutler Group

Arroyo del Agua Formation
El Cobre Canyon Formation

== Fossil quarries ==
The basin is rich in fossil quarries. Its potential was first recognized by John Strong Newberry, who visited the basin in 1859 as part of the Macomb Expedition. Newberry visited the copper mines of El Cobre Canyon and identified Triassic plant leaves. The basin was subsequently visited by Edward Drinker Cope in 1874 during the Wheeler Survey, David Baldwin collected from sites in the Arroyo del Agua area for five field seasons between 1877 and 1881, working first for O.C. Marsh and later for Cope, who was Marsh's bitter rival. The Baldwin bonebed yielded the first Permian vertebrates discovered in New Mexico. However, Baldwin failed to elicit much interest from either Marsh or Cope.

The famous Whitaker quarry of Ghost Ranch, New Mexico, also been referred to as the Coelophysis quarry due to preserving a large number of specimens of the early theropod dinosaur Coelophysis bauri, was one of the most important of the basin. Even richer is the Snyder quarry, discovered in 1998.
