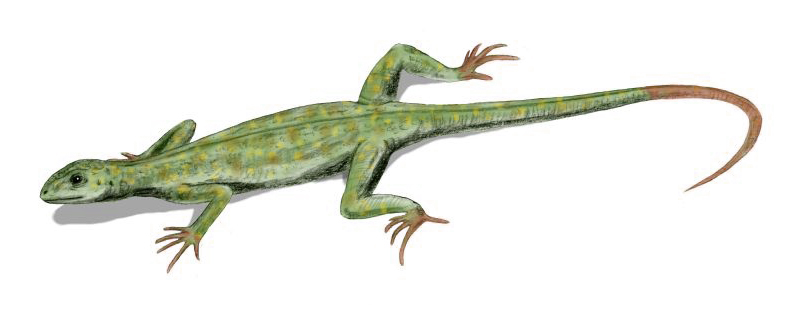
- Petrolacosaurus kansensis

Scientific classification
- Kingdom: Animalia
- Phylum: Chordata
- Order: †Araeoscelidia
- Family: †Petrolacosauridae; Peabody, 1952
- Genus: †Petrolacosaurus; Lane, 1945

Species
- Petrolacosaurus kansensis Lane, 1945

Synonyms
- Podargosaurus hibbardi Lane, 1945

= Petrolacosaurus =

Petrolacosaurus Temporal range: 302 Ma Late Pennsylvanian, Gzhelian

Genus of tetrapods

Petrolacosaurus ("rock lake lizard") is an extinct genus of sauropsid from the late Carboniferous period. It was a small, 40-centimetre (16 in) long reptile, and one of the earliest known reptiles with two temporal fenestrae. This means that it was near the base of Diapsida (it may have been the basal taxon), the largest and most successful radiation of reptiles that would eventually include all modern reptile groups, as well as dinosaurs (which survived to the modern day as birds) and other famous extinct reptiles such as plesiosaurs, ichthyosaurs, and pterosaurs. However, Petrolacosaurus itself was part of Araeoscelidia, a short-lived early branch of the sauropsid family tree which went extinct prior to the middle Permian.

== Discovery ==
The first Petrolacosaurus fossil was found in 1932 in Garnett, Kansas, by a field expedition from the University of Kansas Natural History Museum. The party consisted of Henry H. Lane, Claude Hibbard, David Dunkle, Wallace Lane, Louis Coghill, and Curtis Hesse. Unfortunately, no field notes or documentation of their discovery are available.

Petrolacosaurus fossils were found preserved within a layer of laminated shale that was also plant bearing. The strata that the remains were found in the middle Gzhelian age (middle Stephanian age on the European scale) of the Upper Pennsylvanian.

== Description ==
=== Skull ===
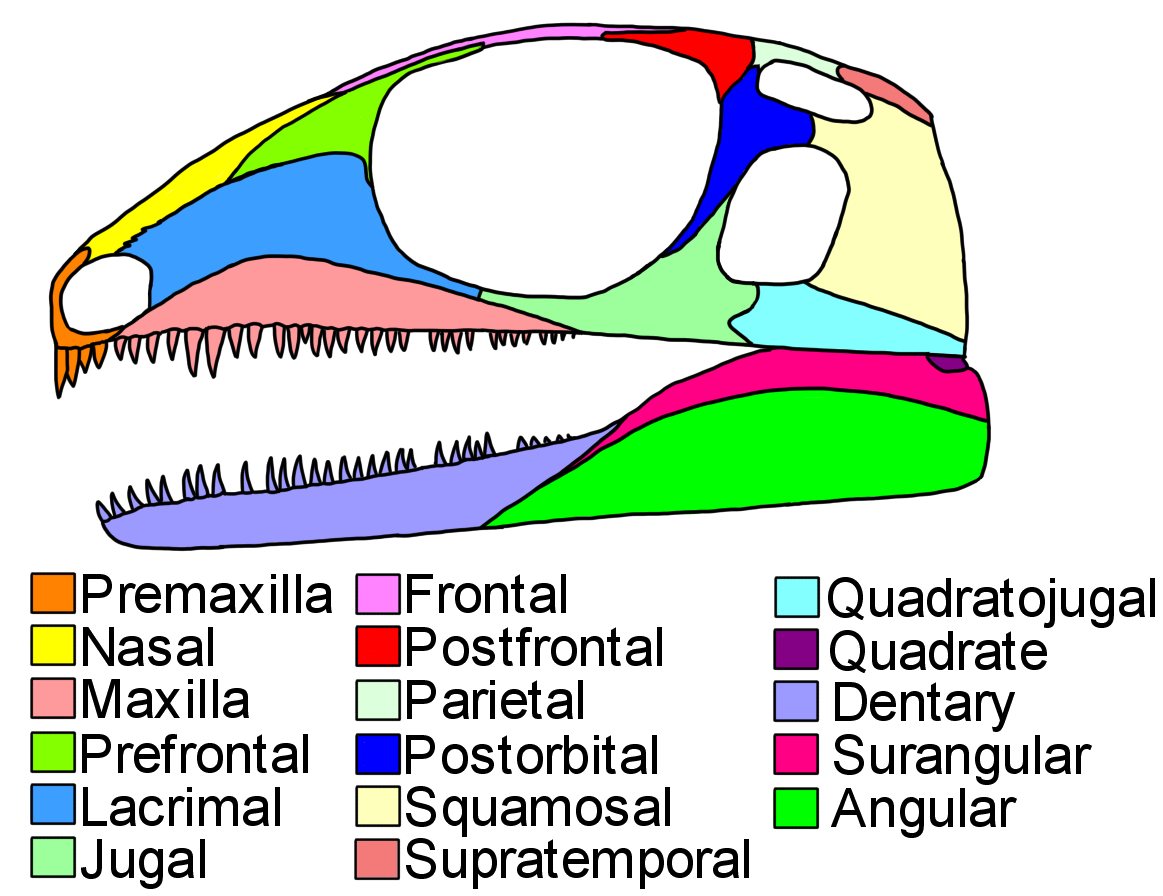
Skull diagram

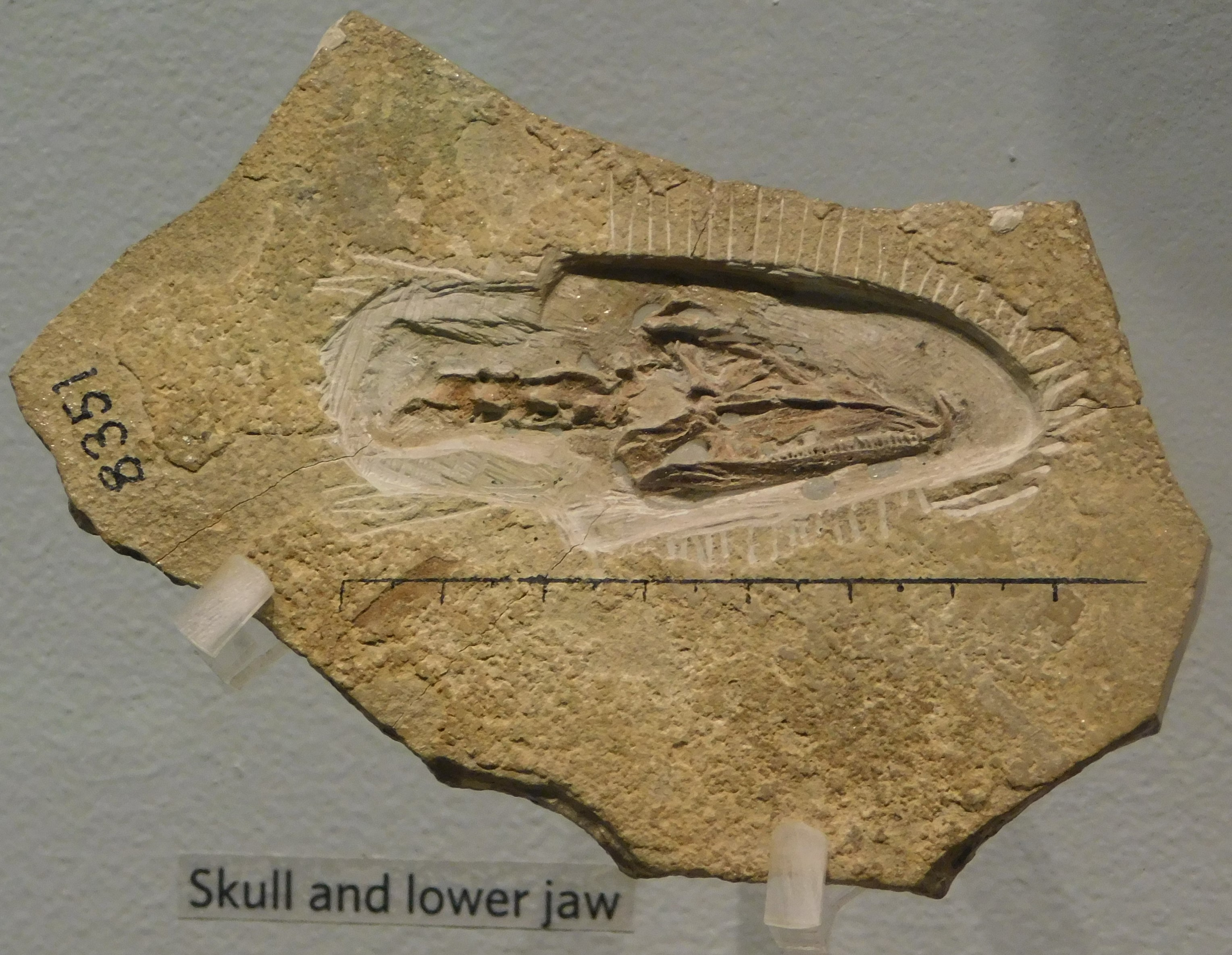
Skull fossil (specimen KUVP 8351)

Specimens reveal that Petrolacosaurus had a slightly elongated skull with two temporal fenestrae. The upper temporal fenestra is located posteriorly to an enlarged orbit. This gives Petrolacosaurus an anatomically diapsid skull, a feature that is convergently shared with neodiapsid reptiles.

The largest teeth in the jaw were at the front of the snout, erupting from the premaxilla bone. There were also a few larger-than average teeth further back on the maxilla, which were probably homologous with caniform teeth retained from the common ancestor between true sauropsid reptiles and synapsids (mammal ancestors). On the dentary, there are marginal teeth, displaying a primitive type of shallow implantation. The palatal arrangement bears close resemblance to Youngoides.

=== Axial skeleton ===
There are seven elongated cervical vertebrae, 2 sacrals, and 60 caudal vertebrae. The number and placement of the vertebrae show that Petrolacosaurus was a rather long-necked reptile with a shorter torso. The number and spool-like shape of the vertebrae, in addition to the poses that the reptiles died in, show that they were also very flexible creatures.

The vertebral centra were amphicoelous (concave from the front and behind) and had large ventrolateral depressions. A similar depression can be seen on the massive neural arches, running from the prezygapophyses to the postzygapophysis. These depressions allowed the vertebral column to be lighter while still retaining a sturdy build.

=== Pectoral girdle ===
The pectoral girdle in Petrolacosaurus is light in comparison to the massive girdles found in taxa such as pelycosaurs. Petrolacosaurus specimens had a clavicle with an expanded ventral blade, yet shorter than that of Captorhinus or pelycosaurs. Also, there is a large cleithrum with a broad, rounded end.

=== Limbs ===
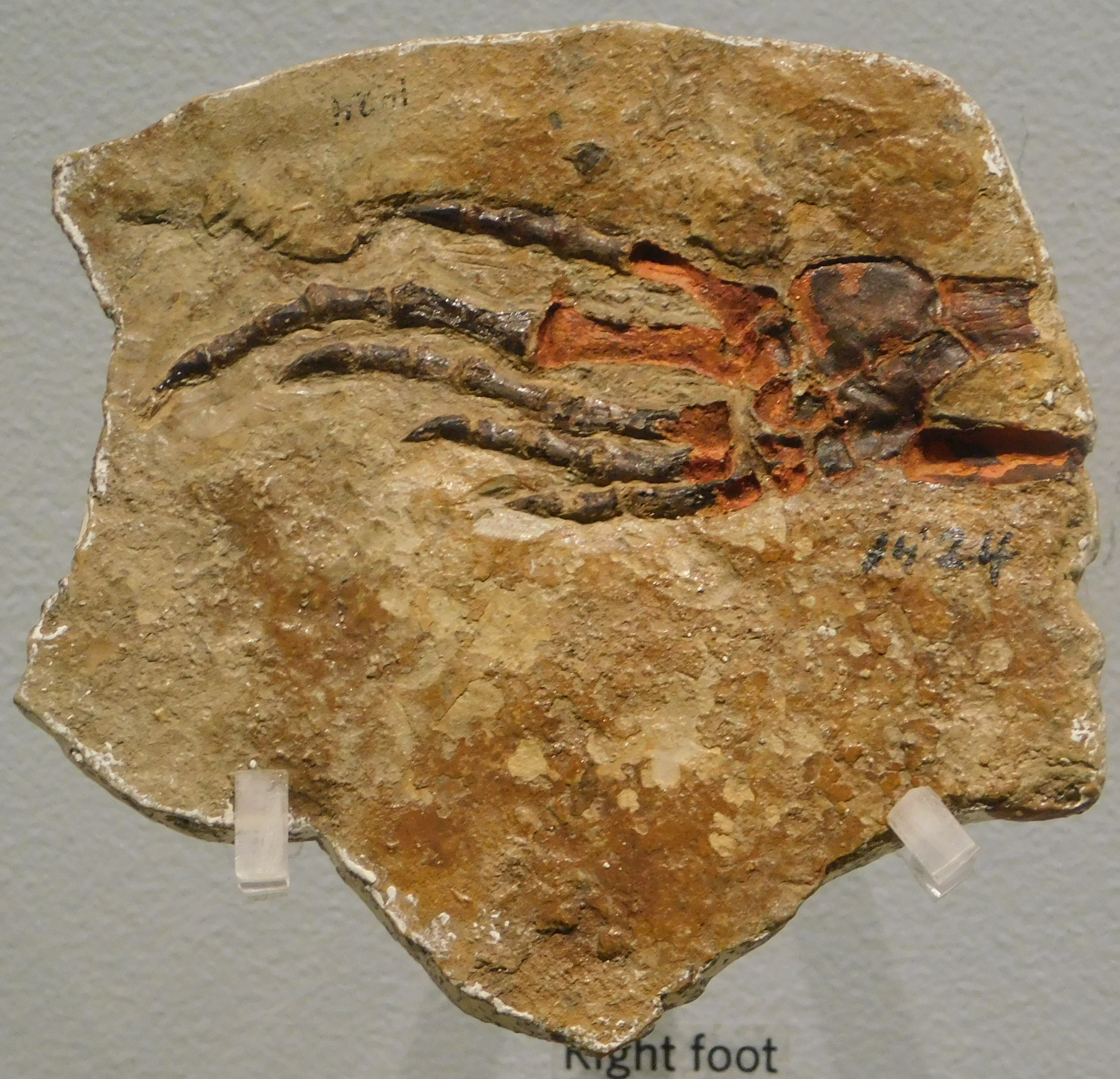
Specimen KUVP 1424, an articulated foot fossil which serves as the holotype of Petrolacosaurus

The limbs of Petrolacosaurus were long and slender in comparison to other primitive diapsids such as Araeoscelis.

The radius and ulna in Petrolacosaurus are of relatively equal length. Unlike these two bones, the fibula is significantly shorter than the tibia, because the tibia has distal articulation with the astragalus. This length difference is further pronounced because the astragalus has a long-neck and buttressed, oblique platform providing an inflexible, concave articulation with the tibia. This articulation creates a virtually immobile joint between the two.

Petrolacosaurus has a phalangeal formula for the manus of 2-3-4-5-3. For the pes, the formula is 2-3-4-5-4. The digits increase in length from digit I-digit V. Metatarsal IV is 3.5 times as long as metatarsal I. Many lines of post-Paleozoic reptiles have a reduction in digit IV in the manus and pes, indicating that Petrolacosaurus is more primitive than those reptiles.

== Classification ==
Although originally described as a pelycosaur, Petrolacosaurus is a member of the basal sauropsid order Araeoscelidia, along with the aquatic, late Pennsylvanian Spinoaequalis.

The specific taxonomic placement of Petrolacosaurus is a highly debated topic. Petrolacosaurus bears an anatomically diapsid skull similar to neodiapsid reptiles, a feature that has led some studies to consider Petrolacosaurus to be a close relatives of neodiapsid reptiles. However, numerous other features of the braincase, palate, and postcrania conflict with this placement and instead suggest that araeoscelidians like Petrolacosaurus are among the most primitive groups of sauropsids, a phylogenetic hypothesis that is consistent with their occurrence in the fossil record (~305 Ma). In constrast, neodiapsids appear approximately 50 million years later in the Late Permian (~255 Ma).

== Phylogeny ==
- Diapsida
  - Neodiapsida
  - Araeoscelidia
    - Spinoaequalis
    - Araeosceloidea
      - Petrolacosauridae
        - Petrolacosaurus
      - Araeoscelidae
        - Zarcasaurus
        - Araeoscelinae
          - Kadaliosaurus
          - - Araeoscelis
            - Aphelosaurus

Phylogenetic relationships based on De Braga & Reisz (1995) and Falconnet & Steyer (2007).

== Paleobiology ==
=== Diet ===
Petrolacosaurus teeth were of moderate length, slightly recurved, and possessed no lateral compression. Located on the premaxilla of the upper jaw are two teeth, reminiscent of fangs. On the dentary were around 25 smaller teeth, all of different lengths. Placement in the jaw reveals that the teeth on the upper and lower jaw do not interlock but rather meet along a medial plane. The haphazard tooth lengths is consistent with a primitive method of regular tooth replacement. The teeth located on the transverse flange of the pterygoid were significantly larger than the others, indicating that these teeth were specialized for grabbing smaller, hard shelled insects.

The jaws of Petrolacosaurus were long and slender. Based on the skeletal muscle attachment points and the shortened temporal region, adductor muscles would have had limited amounts of leverage, resulting in a quick but weak bite. This is further support for the hypothesis that Petrolacosaurus was insectivorous.

=== Environment ===
The mud that the reptile was fossilized in is known to create well preserved insect and plant prints, allowing extrapolation about the surrounding environment. Because of fossil evidence of winged insects, the fruits of conifers, and other pteridosperms, Petrolacosaurus is thought to be a completely terrestrial reptile that lived in a conifer-fern forest.

The front limb is 135 mm and the back limb is 165 mm, giving the reptile a length ratio of almost 1x as long as the dorsal-sacral region. Petrolacosaurus also has a zeugopodium in both its front and hind limbs that is longer than the stylopodium. In aquatic reptile species, a shorter zeugopodium and longer stylopodium are characteristic in fins. Both this length relationship and a wide sacral rib in Petrolacosaurus are indicative of a sprawled, quadrupedal posture. The elongation of limbs were also adaptations for faster locomotion.

The terrestrial nature and coniferous habitat of Petrolacosaurus bring into question whether or not this genus could climb trees. In 1942, Robert Mertens published an analysis of reptiles that had the morphological traits that conferred with the ability to climb. Among other traits, the main synapomorphies are:

1. Long digits
2. Strongly decurved digits on the front and hind limbs.

The distal tips of the phalanges of Petrolacosaurus has very large and solidly developed lateral tuberosities. These processes on these bones served as attachments for ligaments. On the most distal phalanges, Petrolacosaurus had moderately decurved areas where moderate claws would have attached. The elongated digits and moderate decurved points with claws point to Petrolacosaurus being a moderate climber, perhaps only when being cornered by a predator.
