= List of earliest tools =

The following table attempts to list the oldest-known Paleolithic and Paleo-Indian sites where hominin tools have been found. It includes sites where compelling evidence of hominin tool use has been found, even if no actual tools have been found.

Stone tools preserve more readily than tools of many other materials, making them more abundant than tools made from other materials. In some cases, it may be possible that these stone tools were once accompanied by, or even preceded by non-stone tools that have been lost to time.

Similarly, hard materials like bone or shell are more likely than softer materials to leave discernible cut marks on bone. Bamboo has been shown to leave cut marks on bone that are harder to see than cut marks by stone, so the earliest evidence of tool use that is likely to be found is often cut marks made on bone by stone or shell tools. Therefore, it should not be assumed that the items on this list represent the earliest uses of tools in each area, but rather the earliest uses of tools that have been found.

Because this list focuses on only the earliest evidence of tools, and due to bias towards evidence of stone tools because of its increased likelihood of preservation, this page necessarily omits mention of many significant ancient tools made from non-stone materials because those cases are not among the earliest found within their geographic area. See Timeline of historic inventions for other noteworthy tools and inventions.

This list excludes tools and tool use attributed to non-hominin species. This list is non-exhaustive and only lists the 6 or fewer top candidates for oldest tool site within each significant geographic area.

== Geographic areas covered ==
- Africa
  - East Africa
  - North Africa
  - Southern Africa
  - West Africa
- Americas
  - North America
  - South America
- Asia
  - East Asia
  - Island Southeast Asia - Islands between Sunda Shelf and Sahul, not connected to either one during the Last Glacial Maximum
  - South Asia
  - Sunda Shelf
  - West Asia
- Europe
  - Eastern Europe
  - Western Europe
- Sahul - Australia and New Guinea
- Indian Ocean

For much of the 20th century, a "Clovis first" idea dominated American archeology. Many sites with dates too old to be compatible with "Clovis first" were published, but these were mostly dismissed under the hegemony of "Clovis first." Meanwhile, some indigenous archeologists insisted throughout the "Clovis first" era that the peopling of the Americas was much older than Clovis. Recent publications with very strong evidence for pre-Clovis sites seem to have ended the hegemony of "Clovis first."

== List of tools ==
Name	Date (Ma)	Location	Geographic area	Species	Type	Notes
Dikika	3.39	Hadar, Ethiopia	East Africa	A. afarensis (presumed)	Cut marks on bone	Controversial
Lomekwi 3	3.3	West Turkana, Kenya	East Africa		Stone tools	Mode 0 or Pre-Mode 1 stone tools are named after this site - see Stone tool
Nyayanga	3.0–2.6	Nyayanga, Kenya	East Africa	Paranthropus (associated)	Hominin remains, stone tools	Some, e.g. Kathy Shick, have suggested that the user of the tools may have been early Homo butchering Paranthropus as food. Earliest known Oldowan tools
Masol	2.9–2.7	Chandigarh, India	South Asia		Cut marks on bone	Controversial
Bokol Dora 1 (BD 1)	2.6	Ledi-Geraru, Ethiopia	East Africa		Stone tools	
Gona	2.6	Ethiopia	East Africa		Stone tools	
Bouri Hatayae layer	2.5	Ethiopia	East Africa		Cut marks and percussion marks on bone	
Longgupo	2.48	Longgupo, southwest China	East Asia		Stone tools and dental fragments	Controversial. Russell L. Ciochon has retracted the attribution to Homo and casts doubt on the dates of the tools: "Although I no longer consider the Longgupo jaw to be human, the two stone tools still stand as described. They must have been more recent additions to the site." Ciochon provides no direct evidence for his conclusion that the tools were "more recent additions." See Wushan Man
Aïn Boucherit	2.4	Algeria	North Africa		Stone tools	
Xihoudu	2.4	Shanxi Province, China	East Asia		Stone tools	Controversial
Renzidong (Renzi Cave)	2.4–2.0	Renzidong, southeast China	East Asia		Stone tools	Controversial
Shangchen	2.1	Shaanxi, China	East Asia		Stone tools and much later hominin remains (H. erectus)	Controversial
Drimolen Main Quarry (DMQ)	2	South Africa	Southern Africa	H. erectus, P. robustus (associated)	Hominin remains, stone tools, bone tools	
Melka Kunture	1.95	Ethiopia	East Africa		Stone tools	Possibly earliest known Acheulean tools, or "proto-Acheulean" or late Oldowan tools.
Riwat	1.9	Riwat, Pakistan	South Asia		Stone tools	Controversial - the tools were found in a "secondary context"
Aïn al Fil	1.8	El Kowm, Syria	West Asia		Stone tools	
Dmanisi	1.8	Dmanisi, Georgia	West Asia	H. erectus (associated)	Hominin remains, stone tools, butchery	
Swartkrans	1.8	South Africa	Southern Africa	Homo, P. robustus (associated)	Hominin remains, bone tools	
Sterkfontein StW 53	1.8–1.5	South Africa	Southern Africa		Cut marks on hominin bone	Controversial
West Turkana	1.76	Kenya	East Africa		Stone tools	Earliest known Acheulean tools
Sangiran	1.6–1.5	Java, Indonesia	Sunda Shelf	H. erectus (associated)	Hominin remains, shell tool cut marks on bone	
Socotra Island	2.5–1.4	Socotra Island	Indian Ocean	H. erectus (presumed)	Stone tools	Oldowan stone tools. May very well be earliest evidence of seafaring.
Kozarnika, Dimovo Municipality	1.4-1.6	Bulgaria	Eastern Europe	H. erectus (associated)	Stone tools, hominin remains, cut marks on bone	
Pirro Nord	1.3-1.6	Italy	Western Europe		Stone tools	
Sterkfontein Member 5	1.1-1.6	South Africa	Southern Africa		Stone tools, Homo and Paranthropus remains	
Barranco León	1.2-1.4	Spain	Western Europe		Stone tools, animal bones, bone flakes	
Bois de Riquet US 2	1.2	France	Western Europe		Stone tools	
Wolo Sege, So'a Basin	1	Flores, Indonesia	Island Southeast Asia	H. floresiensis (presumed)	Stone tools	
Happisburgh	0.9–0.7	Great Britain	Western Europe		Stone tools	
Kalinga site	0.7	Luzon, Philippines	Island Southeast Asia	H. luzonensis (presumed)	Stone tools, cut marks on bone	See Nesorhinus
Mata Menge, So'a Basin	0.7	Flores, Indonesia	Island Southeast Asia	H. floresiensis (presumed)	Stone tools	
Ounjougou	0.5–0.15	Mali	West Africa		Stone tools	
Talepu	0.2	Sulawesi	Island Southeast Asia		Stone tools	
Cerutti Mastodon site	0.13	California	North America		Cobbles, percussion marks on bones	Controversial
Warratyi Rockshelter	0.049	South Australia	Sahul	H. sapiens (presumed)	Stone and bone tools, numerous animal remains	
Carpenter's Gap Shelter 1	0.049–0.044	Western Australia	Sahul	H. sapiens (presumed)	Ground stone axe flake	
Pedra Furada	0.048–0.023	Brazil	South America	H. sapiens (presumed)	Stone tools	Controversial
Topper site	0.05–0.016	South Carolina, USA	North America	H. sapiens (presumed)	Stone tools	Controversial
Hartley Mammoth Site	0.037	New Mexico	North America		Butchered bones	Controversial
Arroyo del Viscaino	0.03	Uruguay	South America		Cut marks on bone	Controversial
Chiquihuite cave	0.03	Mexico	North America	H. sapiens (presumed)	Stone tools, animal bones, charcoal	Controversial
Santa Elina Shelter	0.027	Brazil	South America		Stone tools, animal bones	Controversial
Cactus Hill	0.018	Virginia, USA	North America	H. sapiens (presumed)	Stone tools	Controversial
Rimrock Draw Rockshelter	0.018–0.017	Oregon, USA	North America	H. sapiens (presumed)	Stone tools, animal bones	
Monte Verde I	0.018–0.014	Chile	South America	H. sapiens (presumed)	Stone tools, bone fragments, charcoal	
Arroyo Seco 2	0.014	Argentina	South America	H. sapiens (presumed)	Stone tools, cut marks on bone	

== See also ==
- Hominini
- List of human evolution fossils
- Stone Age
- Stone tool
- Timeline of historic inventions
- Tool use by non-humans
