= Arroyo del Agua Formation =

Geologic formation in New Mexico, United States

- Stratigraphic range: Cisuralian
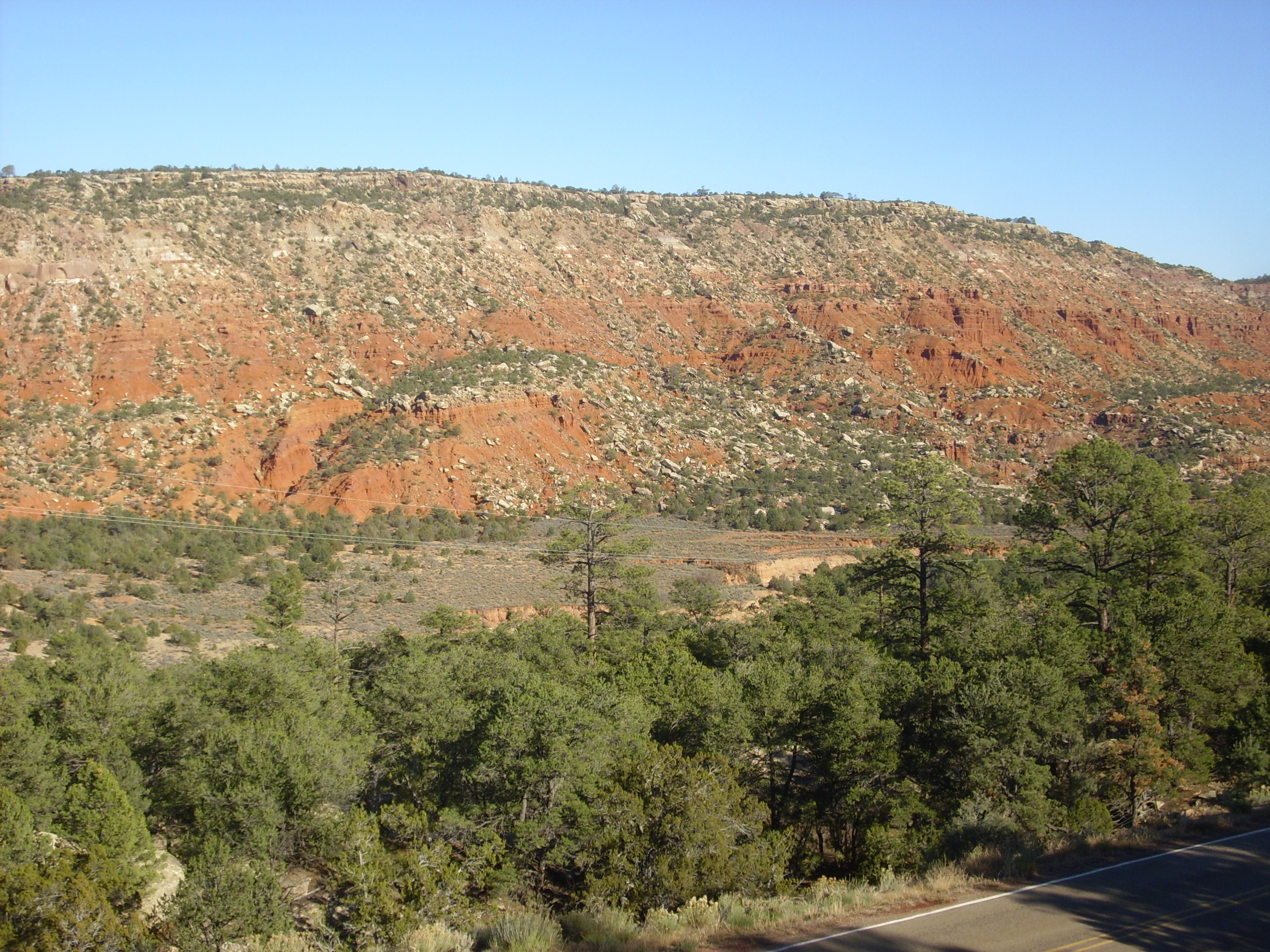
- Mesa Montosa near Arroyo Del Agua, New Mexico
- Type: Formation
- Unit of: Cutler Group
- Underlies: De Chelly Sandstone, Shinarump Conglomerate
- Overlies: El Cobre Canyon Formation
- Thickness: 120 m (390 ft)

Lithology
- Primary: Siltstone
- Other: Sandstone

Location
- Coordinates: 36.1676763°N 106.6495486°W
- Region: New Mexico
- Country: United States

Type section
- Named for: Arroyo Del Agua, New Mexico
- Named by: Lucas and Krainer
- Year defined: 2005
- Arroyo del Agua Formation (the United States) Arroyo del Agua Formation (New Mexico)

The Arroyo del Agua Formation is a geologic formation in New Mexico. It preserves fossils dating back to the early Permian period.

== Description ==
The Arroyo del Agua Formation consists of siliclastic red beds with a total thickness of roughly 120 meters (390 feet). These lie conformably on the El Cobre Canyon Formation and are in turn overlain in most locations by the Shinarump Conglomerate. In a few locations in the southernmost Chama Basin, there is a tongue of De Chelly Sandstone between the Arroyo del Agua and Shinarump.

The formation is 58% siltstone and 34% sandstone, with minor conglomerate and calcrete (each about 4%). The siltstone beds also contain numerous calcrete nodules, and they form thick slopes between thin sandstone sheets. The sandstone sheets themselves are coarse, arkosic, and trough crossbedded. The minor conglomerate beds are mostly composed of intraformational calcrete clasts, but conglomerate beds containing extraformational quartzite clasts are more common in the upper part of the formation. The formation is well exposed in the walls of El Cobre Canyon and in the valley of the Rio Puerco.

The formation superficially resembles the underlying El Cobre Canyon Formation. However, the siltstone beds are more orange in color than the brown beds of the underlying El Cobre Canyon Formation, allowing the two to be easily distinguished. Other distinguishing characteristics include the multistoried sandstone beds of the El Cobre Canyon Formation compared with the thin sandstone sheets of the Arroyo del Agua Formation; the thin siltstone beds of the El Cobre Canyon Formation compared with the thick siltstone beds of the Arrroyo del Agua Formation; the greater amount of extraformational conglomerate in the El Cobre Canyon Formation; and the much more calcareous nature of the beds of the El Cobre Canyon Formation compared with the Arroyo del Agua Formation.

The Arroyo del Agua Formation correlates with the upper Abo Formation to the south.

== Fossils ==
Compared with the underlying El Cobre Canyon Formation, the Arroyo del Agua Formation is relatively scarce in age-diagnostic fossils. The known fossils indicate a late Wolfcampian age.

Tetrapods of the Arroyo del Agua Formation
Genus	Species	Notes
Diadectes	Indet.	A Diadectomorphan.
Platyhystrix	P. rugosus	A sail backed amphibian.
Ophiacodon	O. retroversus	An ophiacodontid.
Seymouria	S. sanjuanensis	An seymouriamorph.
Sphenacodon	S. ferox	A sphenacodontid.

== History of investigation ==
Although the Cutler Formation in the Chama Basin has been well studied for its fossil fauna since the Macomb expedition of 1858, its lithology was long neglected. Dalton mapped the Permian redbeds of the Chama Basin as Abo Formation in 1928. In 1946, Wood and Northrop mapped the Pennsylvanian-Permian red beds north of latitude 36 degrees as Cutler Formation and south of that latitude as Abo Formation. It was not until 2005 that the lithology of these beds was well enough characterized for it to be raised to group status and divided into the lower El Cobre Canyon Formation and upper Arroyo del Agua Formation by Lucas and Krainer in 2005.

== See also ==
- List of fossiliferous stratigraphic units in New Mexico
- Paleontology in New Mexico
