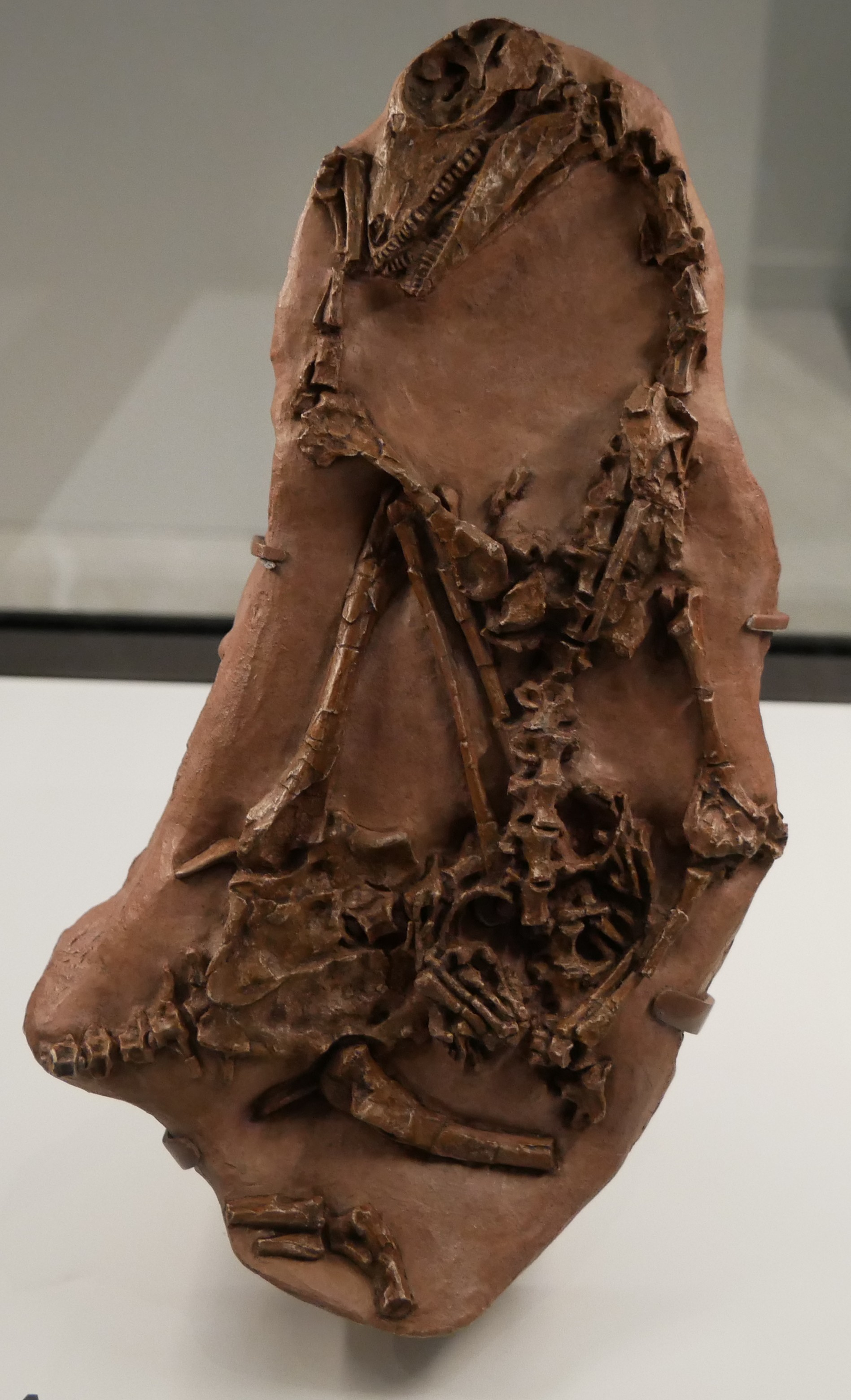
- Fossil at Yale Peabody Museum

Scientific classification
- Kingdom: Animalia
- Phylum: Chordata
- Order: †Araeoscelidia
- Family: †Araeoscelidae
- Genus: †Araeoscelis; Williston 1910

Type species
- Araeoscelis gracilis Williston 1910

Species
- †A. casei (Broom 1913); †A. gracilis Williston 1910

Synonyms
- Ophiodeirus Broom 1913

= Araeoscelis =

Araeoscelis Temporal range: Artinskian 284.4–275.6 Ma

Extinct genus of tetrapods

Araeoscelis (from Greek: αραιά araiá, 'thin' and Greek: σκελίς skelís, 'ribs of beef') is an extinct genus of sauropsid from the Early Permian of what is now Texas. Fossils have been found in the Nocona, Arroyo and Waggoner Ranch Formations. Two species have been described, A. casei and A. gracilis.

Araeoscelis belonged to the clade Araeoscelidia together with close relatives such as Petrolacosaurus. Araeoscelidia is often considered one of the most basal groups of sauropsids or as the earliest "diapsid" stem-reptiles, but some analyses have recovered them as stem-amniotes instead.

== Description ==
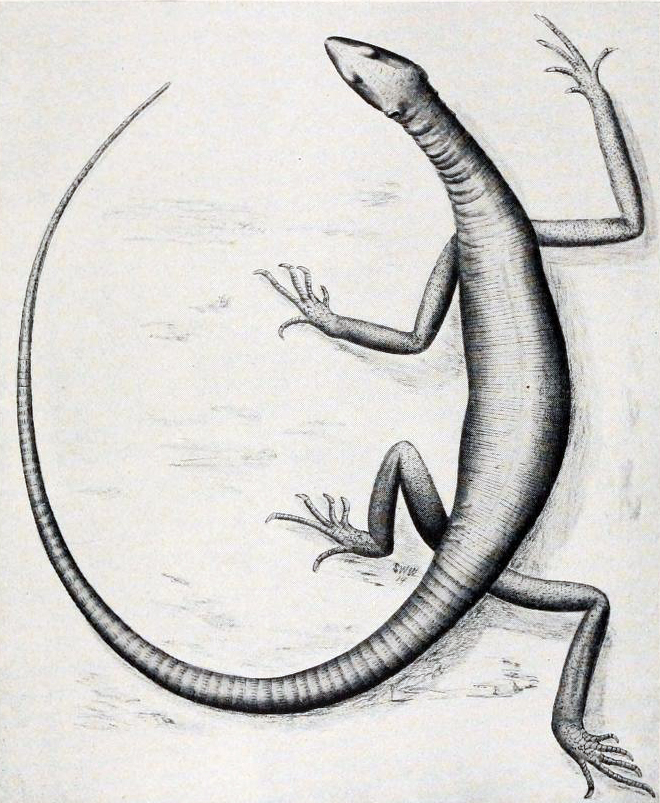
1914 restoration by Samuel Wendell Williston

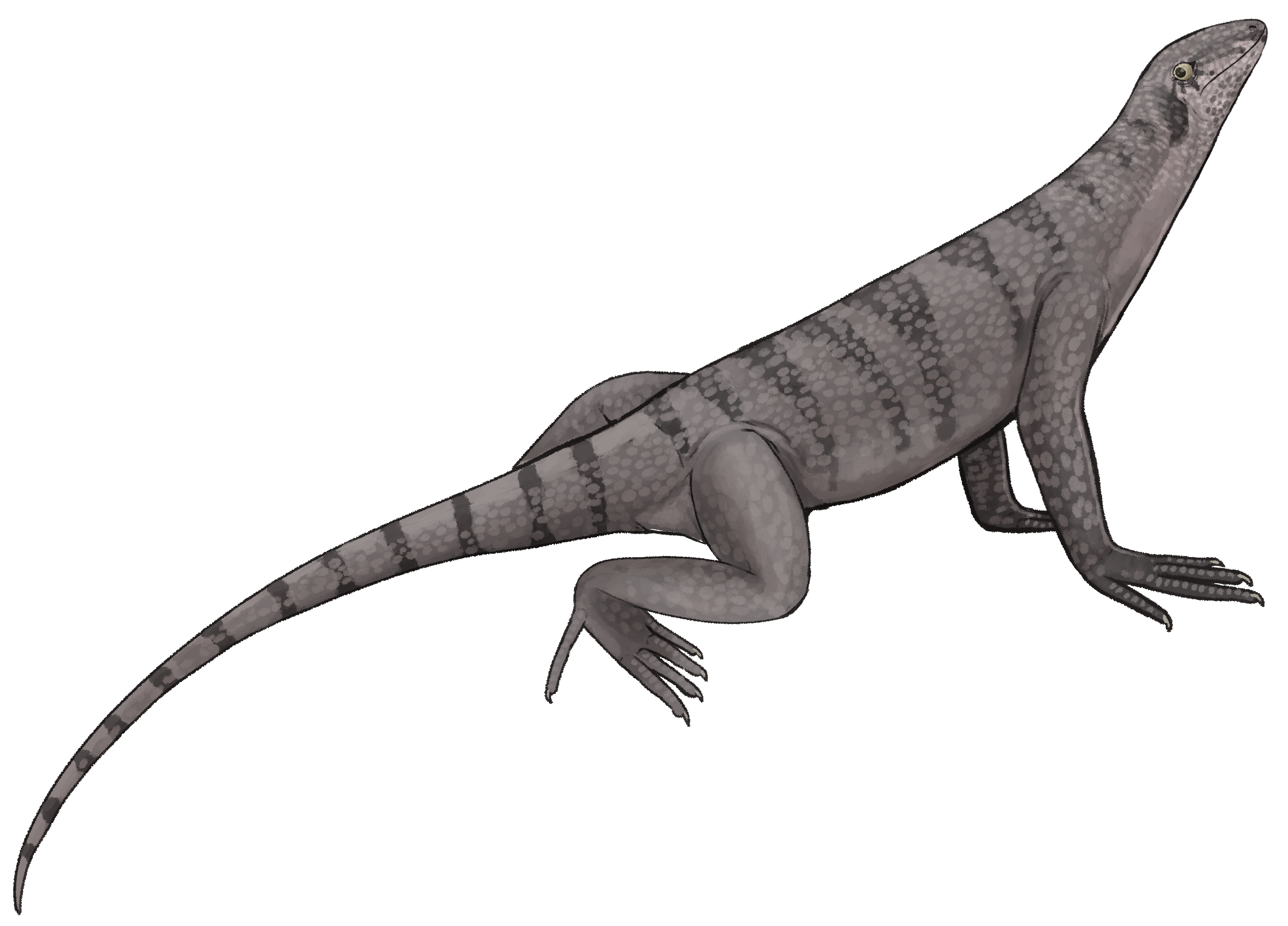
Artist's restoration

Araeoscelis was around 60 centimetres (2.0 ft) long, and superficially resembled a modern lizard. It differed from other araeoscelidians, such as Petrolacosaurus, in that its teeth were larger and blunter; possibly they were used for cracking insect carapaces.

Unlike Petrolacosaurus, which possessed the two pairs of skull openings characteristic of diapsids, in Araeoscelis the lower pair of temporal fenestrae were closed with bone, resulting in a euryapsid condition. This would have made the skull more solid, presumably allowing a more powerful bite.

== Ichnology ==
Footprints found in Nova Scotia have been attributed to Araeoscelis or a close relative.
