= Euryapsida =

Group of extinct reptiles

A euryapsid skull.

Euryapsida is a polyphyletic (unnatural, as the various members are not closely related) group of sauropsids that are distinguished by a single temporal fenestra, an opening behind the orbit, under which the post-orbital and squamosal bones articulate. They are different from Synapsida, which also have a single opening behind the orbit, by the placement of the fenestra. In synapsids, this opening is below the articulation of the post-orbital and squamosal bones. It is now commonly believed that euryapsids (particularly sauropterygians) are in fact diapsids (which have two fenestrae behind the orbit) that lost the lower temporal fenestra. Euryapsids are usually considered entirely extinct, although turtles might be part of the sauropterygian clade while other authors disagree. Euryapsida may also be a synonym of Sauropterygia sensu lato.

The ichthyosaurian skull is sometimes described as having a metapsid (or parapsid) condition instead of a truly euryapsid one. In ichthyosaurs, the squamosal bone is never part of the fenestra's margin. Parapsida was originally a taxon consisting of ichthyosaurs, squamates, protorosaurs, araeoscelidans and pleurosaurs.

Historically, a variety of reptiles with upper fenestrae, either alone or with a lower emargination, have been considered euryapsid or parapsid, and to have had their patterns of fenestration originate separately from those of diapsids. This includes araeoscelidans, mesosaurs, squamates, pleurosaurids, weigeltisaurids, protorosaurs, and trilophosaurs. With the exception of mesosaurs, which only have the lower temporal opening, all of these are universally agreed to be diapsids which either secondarily closed the lower opening (araeoscelids, trilophosaurs) or lost the lower bar (squamates, pleurosaurs, protorosaurs).

Euryapsida was proposed by Edwin H. Colbert as a substitute for the earlier term Synaptosauria, originally created by Edward D. Cope for a taxon including sauropterygians, turtles and rhynchocephalians. Baur removed the rhynchocephalians from Synaptosauria and Williston later resurrected the taxon, including only Sauropterygia (Nothosauria and Plesiosauria) and Placodontia in it.

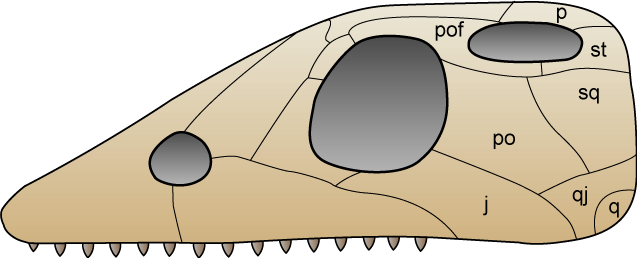
A parapsid skull.

The terms Enaliosauria and Halisauria have also been used for a taxon including ichthyosaurs and sauropterygians.

Some 21st century studies have found that ichthyosaurs, thalattosaurs and sauropterygians were close relatives, either as stem-archosaurs or as stem-saurians.

== See also ==
- Anapsid
- Diapsid
- Synapsida
