= Poleo Formation =

Geologic formation in northern New Mexico, United States

- Stratigraphic range: late Triassic
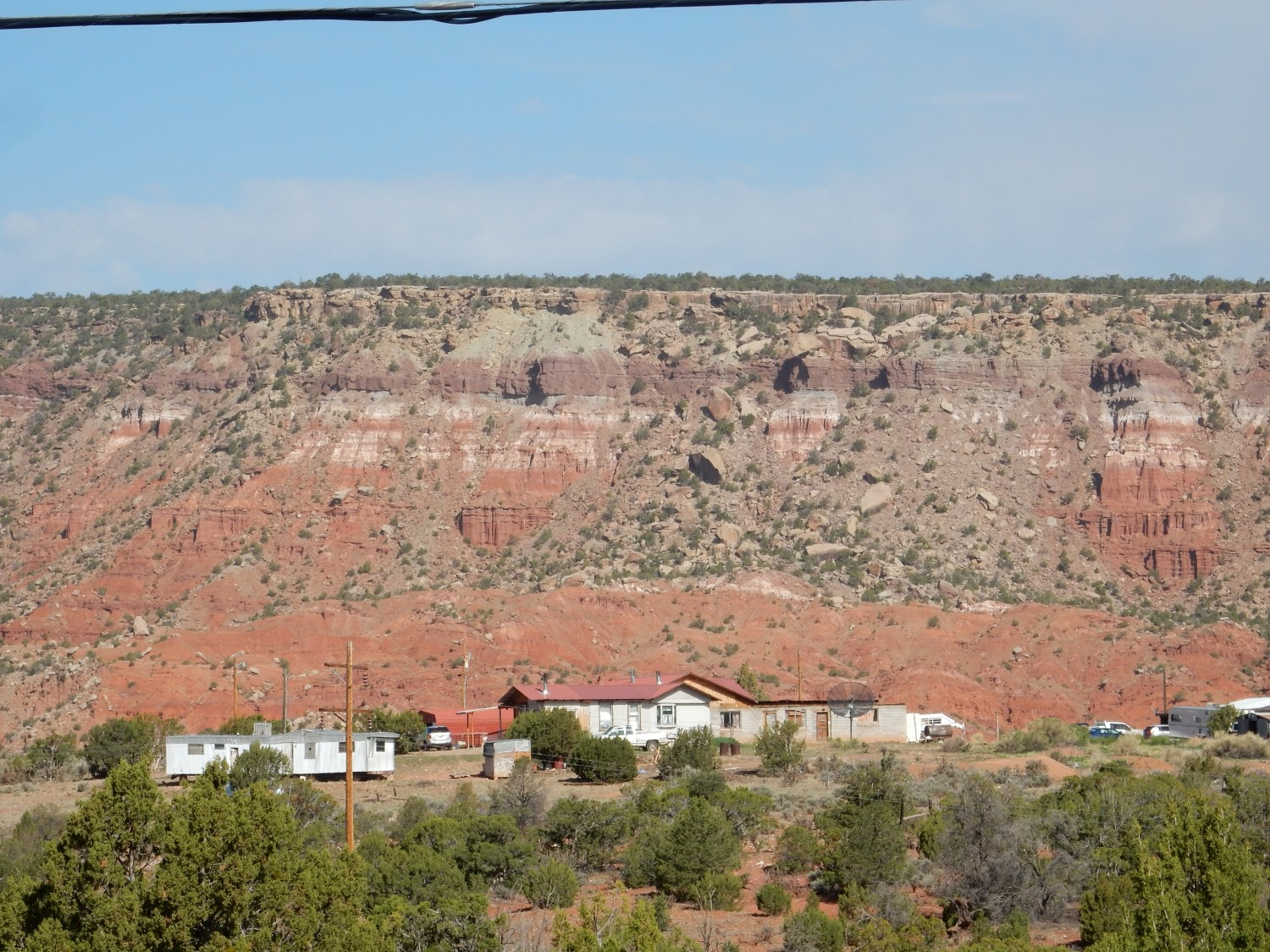
- Poleo Formation at its type location, forming the tan beds capping Mesa Montosa, near Coyote, Rio Arriba County, New Mexico
- Type: Formation
- Unit of: Chinle Group
- Underlies: Petrified Forest Formation
- Overlies: Salitral Formation
- Thickness: 30 m (98 ft)

Lithology
- Primary: Sandstone
- Other: Conglomerate

Location
- Coordinates: 36.173563°N 106.6534824°W
- Region: New Mexico
- Country: United States

Type section
- Named for: Poleo Mesa (now known as Mesa Montoso)
- Named by: Huene
- Year defined: 1911
- Poleo Formation (the United States) Poleo Formation (New Mexico)

The Poleo Formation is a geologic formation in northern New Mexico. Its stratigraphic position corresponds to the late Triassic epoch.

== Description ==
The Poleo Formation is a cliff-forming formation composed mostly of yellowish-gray fine to medium sandstone, but with up to 20% conglomerate. The sandstone shows cross bedding and cuspate ripples. It resembles the Shinarump Conglomerate, and the two formations can be difficult to distinguish where they are not separated by the Salitral Formation. However, the Poleo Formation is finer grained and shows other distinguishing lithological features. The lower contact with the Salitral Formation is sharp and scoured, while the upper contact with the Petrified Forest Formation is gradational. The Poleo Formation has an inverse thickness relationship with the Salitral that suggests the thick sections fill valleys cut into the Salitral.

The formation is exposed throughout the Chama Basin, the Nacimiento Mountains, and Jemez Mountains of New Mexico. It divides the lower and upper Chinle Group where present, but rapidly pinches out to the south, where the underlying Salitral Formation becomes indistinguishable from the overlying Petrified Forest Formation.

The Poleo Formation is at the same stratigraphic position as the Trujillo Formation of West Texas and eastern New Mexico, the Sonsela Member of the Petrified Forest Formation in west-central New Mexico and northeastern Arizona, and the Moss Back Member of southern Utah and southwestern Colorado. All are extensive sandstone sheets, but the Poleo Formation is distinguished by its great local thickness, grayish-yellow color, and lithology of micaceous litharenite and mixed-clast conglomerate.

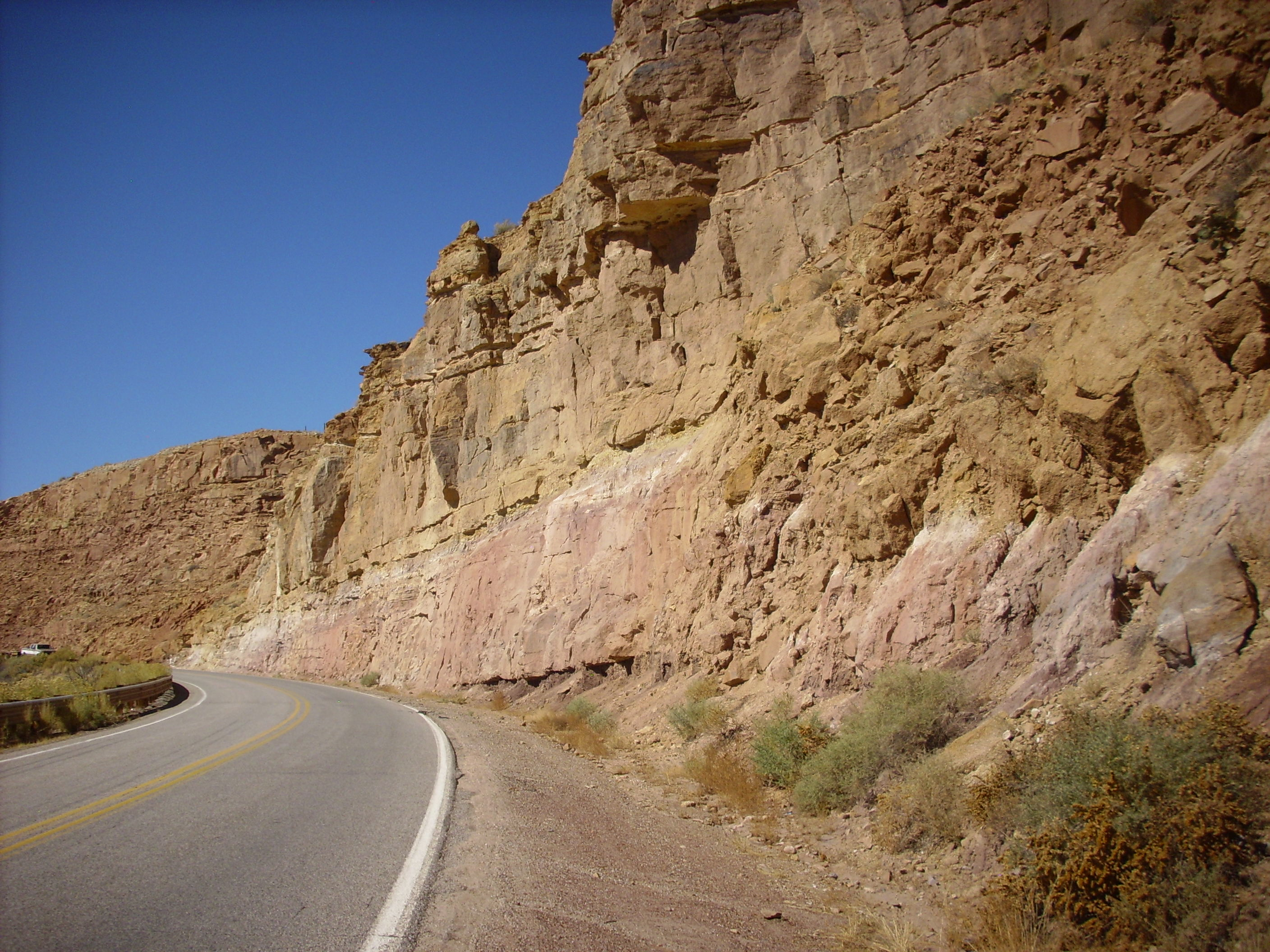
Poleo Formation (tan sandstone beds at top) resting on Salitral and Shinarump Formations. West of Abiquiu, New Mexico.

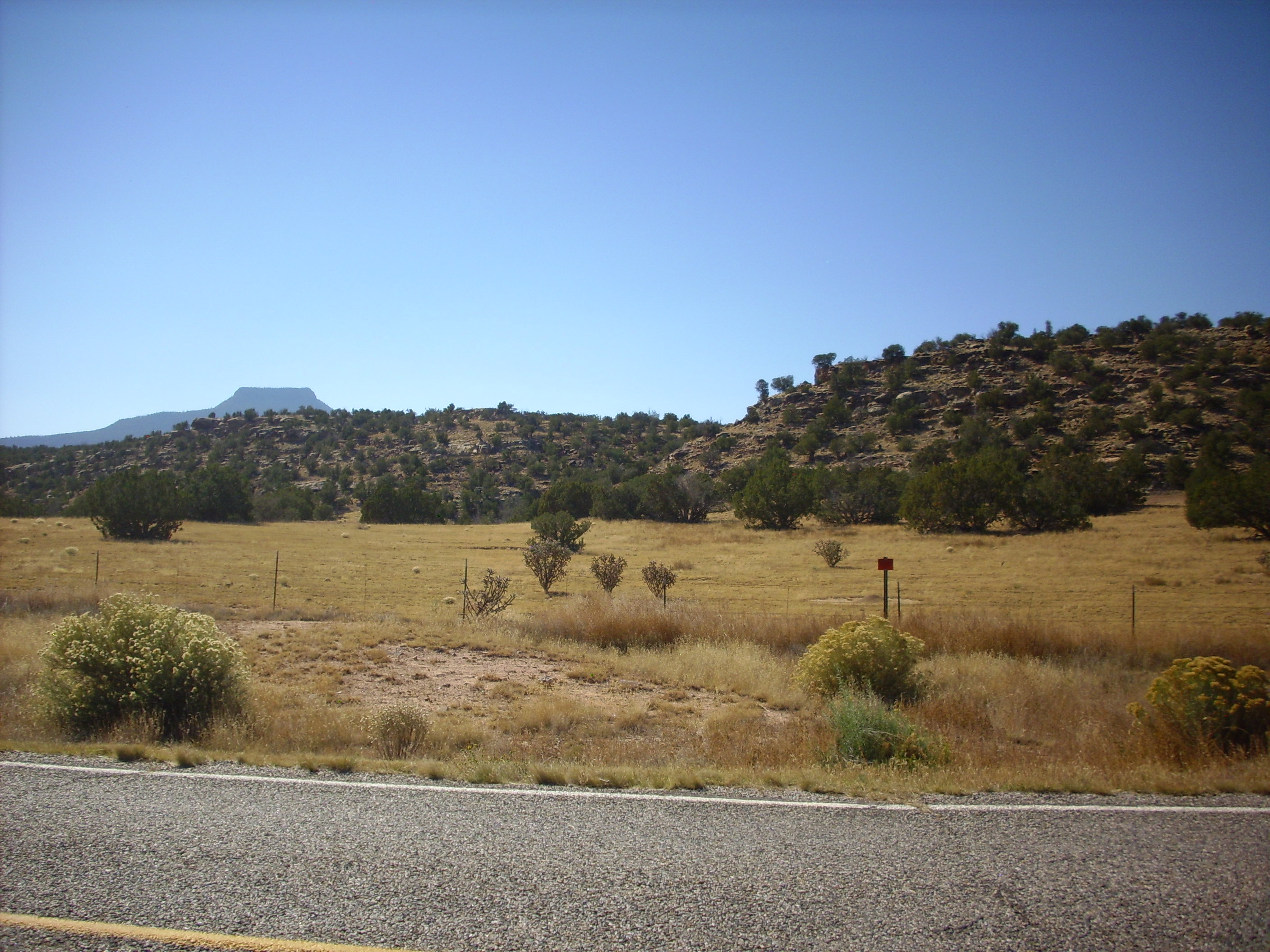
Poleo Formation exposed in fault escarpment, Youngsville, New Mexico, USA

== Fossils ==
The formation is almost devoid of fossils, yielding only oxidized fragments of petrified wood and indeterminate vertebrate bone that are unusable for biostratigraphy.

== History of investigation ==
Huene described the unit in 1911, giving it the name "Poleo-top-sandstone" as the caprock of Mesa Montosa (which he knew as "Mesa Poleo"). During their petroleum survey in 1946, Wood and Northrop formally named it the Poleo sandstone lentil of the Chinle Formation. Lucas and Hunt renamed the unit the Poleo Formation in the same 1992 study in which they raised the Chinle Formation to group rank.
