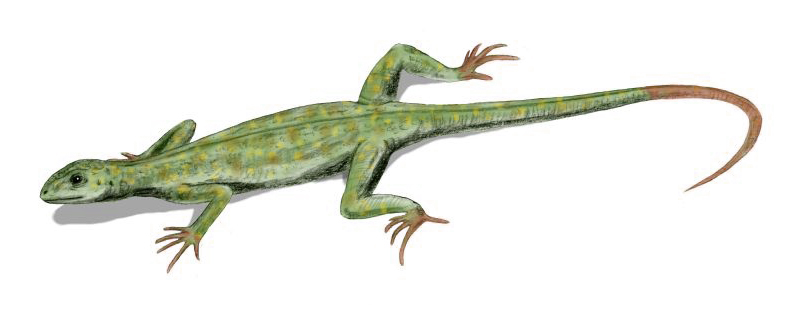

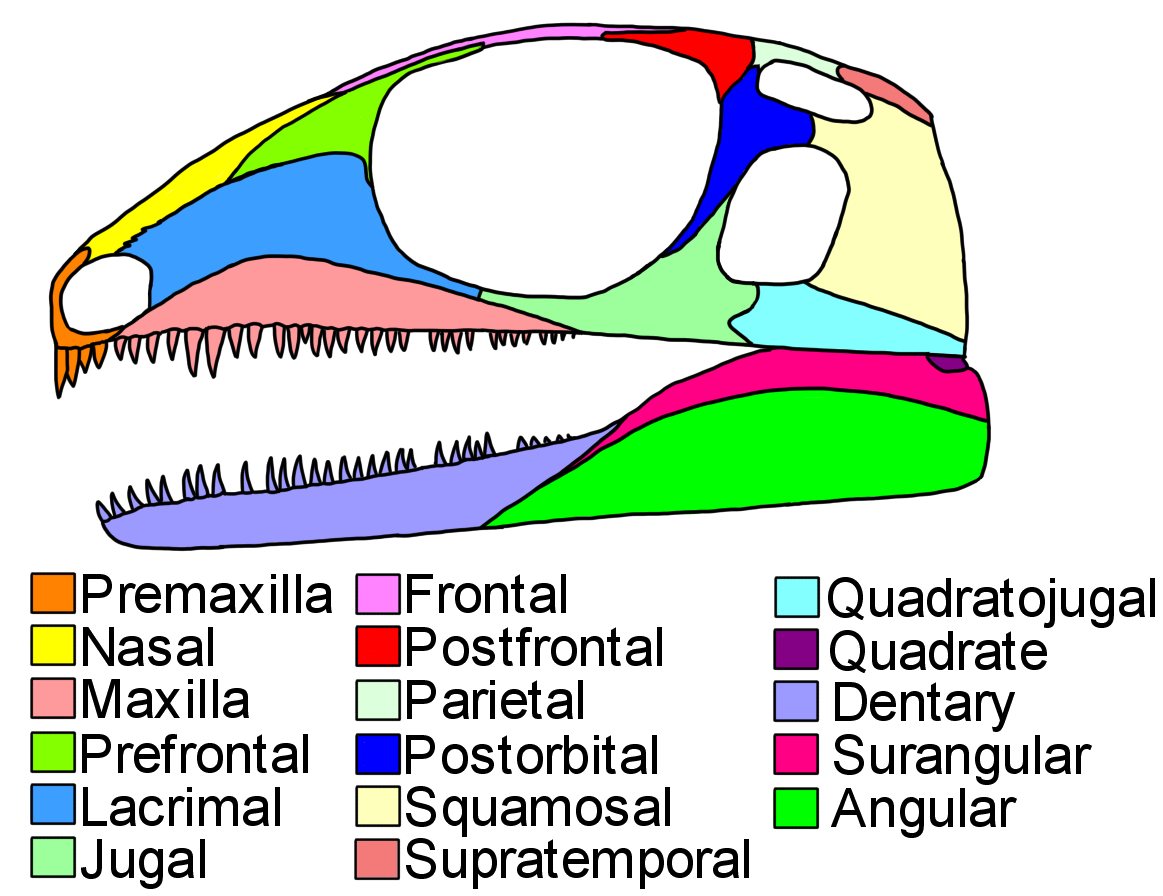
- Life restoration (top) and skull reconstruction (bottom) of Petrolacosaurus kansensis

Scientific classification
- Kingdom: Animalia
- Phylum: Chordata
- Clade: Reptiliomorpha
- Order: †Araeoscelidia; Williston, 1913

Genera
- †Aphelosaurus; †Araeoscelis; †Halgaitosaurus; †Kadaliosaurus; †Petrolacosaurus; †Spinoaequalis; †Zarcasaurus

= Araeoscelidia =

Araeoscelidans Temporal range: Carboniferous–Permian 302–275.6 Ma

Extinct clade of reptiles

Araeoscelidia or Araeoscelida is a clade of extinct tetrapods (traditionally classified as diapsid reptiles) superficially resembling lizards, extending from the Late Carboniferous to the Early Permian. The group contains the genera Araeoscelis, Petrolacosaurus, the possibly aquatic Spinoaequalis, and less well-known genera such as Kadaliosaurus and Zarcasaurus. This clade has historically been considered to be the sister group to all (currently known) later 'diapsids', though studies from the early 2020s onwards have found as among the earliest (if not the earliest) members of Sauropsida unrelated to neodiapsid reptiles, or even outside Sauropsida entirely, suggesting their physically diapsid skull is unrelated to those of modern diapsids.

== Description ==
Araeoscelidians were small animals (less than one meter in length) looking somewhat like lizards, though they are only distantly related to true lizards. They differ from other, earlier sauropsids by their slender limbs, their elongated tail, and of course by the presence of two temporal openings, the feature defining the diapsid condition, although most recent studies considered this to be only convergent with the condition in neodiapsids. In Araeoscelis, only the upper temporal opening remains, thus resulting in a derived euryapsid condition.

== Genera ==
Araeoscelidia includes well-known genera such as Araeoscelis Williston 1910, Petrolacosaurus Lane 1945 and Spinoaequalis, known from virtually complete skeletons. Zarcasaurus, Aphelosaurus and Kadaliosaurus belong to this clade but are known only from post-cranial remains and a mandible fragment for Zarcasaurus.

The genus Dictybolos has been included in Araeoscelidia by Olson (1970) but this inclusion has been criticized e.g., by Evans (1988), especially since Olson also included distantly related groups such as protorosaurs and mesosaurs.

New specimens have been discovered in the United States state of Oklahoma, but lack a scientific description as of 2023.

== Phylogeny ==
The majority of historical phylogenetic studies recovered araeoscelidians as the most basal group of diapsids, however this has recently been challenged, and it has been suggested that the araeoscelidians convergently evolved their diapsid condition separately from those of other diapsids (Neodiapsida).

Cladogram after Bickelmann et al., 2009 and Reisz et al., 2011, showing classical position of Araeoscelidia at the base of Diapsida sister to Neodiapsida:

- - Sauropsida
    - †Parareptilia
      - - †Millerettidae
      - - - †Eunotosaurus
        - †Hallucicrania
          - †Lanthanosuchidae
          - †Procolophonia
            - †Procolophonoidea
            - †Pareiasauromorpha
    - Eureptilia
      - - †Captorhinidae
      - Romeriida
        - - †Paleothyris
        - Diapsida
          - †Araeoscelidia
          - Neodiapsida
            - †Orovenator
            - - †Lanthanolania
              - - †Tangasauridae
                - - †Younginidae
                  - - - †Claudiosaurus
                    - - - - †Palaeagama
                          - †Saurosternon
                      - - - †Coelurosauravus
                        - - - †Thalattosauria
                            - - †Hupehsuchia
                              - †Ichthyopterygia
                          - Sauria
                            - Lepidosauromorpha
                            - Archosauromorpha

However, Simões et al. (2022) recover them as stem-amniotes instead, as the sister group to the clade including Captorhinidae and Protorothyris archeri.

- Reptiliomorpha
  - Seymouriamorpha
  - - Diadectomorpha
    - - - Araeoscelidia
        - - Protorothyris
          - Captorhinidae
      - Amniota
        - Synapsida
        - Sauropsida
          - Acleistorhinidae
          - - Millerettidae
            - - Mesosauria
              - Neoreptilia
                - Procolophonia
                - Neodiapsida (including modern reptiles and birds)

Cladogram of Reptilia after Jenkins et al 2025, which found Araeoscelidia as the most basal group of sauropsids, a placement found by later versions of this dataset as well as studies by Buffa et al :

- Reptilia/Sauropsida
  - †Araeoscelidia
  - - †Bolosauridae
    - Neoreptilia
      - †Ankyramorpha
        - †Acleistorhinidae
        - - †Pareiasauromorpha
          - †Procolophonoidea
      - - †Mesosauridae
        - - - †Cabarzia
            - - †Ascendonanus
              - †Orovenator
          - Parapleurota
            - †Millerettidae
            - Neodiapsida
              - †Younginidae
              - - †Tangasauridae
                - - †Weigeltisauridae
                  - - †Claudiosaurus
                    - Sauria
                      - Lepidosauromorpha
                      - Archosauromorpha

== Stratigraphic and geographic distribution ==
Araeoscelidia are known from the Late Carboniferous in the United States (Petrolacosaurus, Spinoaequalis) to the Early Permian in France (Aphelosaurus), Germany (Kadaliosaurus) and the United States (Dictybolos, Zarcasaurus, Araeoscelis, Halgaitosaurus). Apart from araeoscelidans, only one other anatomical diapsid is known before the Late Permian: Orovenator from the Early Permian of Oklahoma.

== Bibliography ==
- Benton, Michael J. (2000). Vertebrate Paleontology (2nd ed.). Oxford: Blackwell Science. ISBN 0-632-05614-2.
- deBraga, M. & Reisz, R. R. (1995). "A new diapsid reptile from the uppermost Carboniferous (Stephanian) of Kansas". Palaeontology. 38: 199–212.
- deBraga, M. & Rieppel, O. (1997). "Reptile phylogeny and the interrelationships of turtles". Zoological Journal of the Linnean Society. 120 (3): 281–354. doi:10.1111/j.1096-3642.1997.tb01280.x.
- Brinkman, D. B.; Berman, D. S. & Eberth, D. Z. (1984). "A new araeoscelid reptile, Zarcasaurus tandyderus, from the Culter Formation, (Lower Permian) of north-central New Mexico" (PDF). New Mexico Geology. 6 (2): 34–39.
- Carroll, Robert L. (1988). Vertebrate Paleontology and Evolution. New York: W.H. Freeman and Co. ISBN 0-7167-1822-7.
- Credner, H. (1889). "Die Stegocephalen und Saurier aus dem Rothliegenden des Plauen'schen Grundes bei Dresden. 8 – Kadaliosaurus priscus Cred". Zeitschrift der Deutschen Geologischen Gesellschaft. 41: 319–342.
- Evans, S. E. (1988). "The early history and relationships of the Diapsida". In Benton, M. J. (ed.). The phylogeny and classification of the tetrapods. Vol. 1: Amphibians, Reptiles, Birds. Systematics Association Special Volume 35 A. Oxford: Clarendon Press. pp. 221–260. ISBN 0-19-857705-2.
- Falconnet, J. & Steyer, J.-S. (2007). "Revision, osteology and locomotion of Aphelosaurus, an enigmatic reptile from the Lower Permian of France". Journal of Morphology (abstract of the 8th International Congress of Vertebrate Morphology, Paris, July 2007): 38.
- Gervais, P. (1859). Zoologie et paléontologie française (2nd ed.). Paris: Bertrand.
- Laurin, M. (1991). "The osteology of a Lower Permian eosuchian from Texas and a review of a diapsid phylogeny". Zoological Journal of the Linnean Society. 101: 59–95. doi:10.1111/j.1096-3642.1991.tb00886.x.
- May, W. J. & Hall, J. D. (2002). "Geology and vertebrate fauna of a new site in the Wellington Formation (Lower Permian) of Northern Oklahoma". Oklahoma Geology Notes. 62 (2): 63–66.
- Olson, E. C. (1970). "New and little known genera and species of vertebrates from the Lower Permian of Oklahoma". Fieldiana: Geology. 18: 359–434.
- Peabody, F. E. (1952). "Petrolacosaurus kansensis Lane, a Pennsylvanian reptile from Kansas". University of Kansas Paleontological Contributions. 10: 1–41. hdl:1808/3785.
- Reisz, R. R. (1981). "A diapsid reptile from the Pennsylvanian of Kansas". Special Publication of the Museum of Natural History, University of Kansas. 7: 1–74.
- Reisz, R. R.; Berman, D. S. & Scott, D. (1984). "The anatomy and relationships of the Lower Permian reptile Araeoscelis". Journal of Vertebrate Paleontology. 4 (1): 57–67. doi:10.1080/02724634.1984.10011986.
- Reisz, Robert R.; Modesto, Sean P.; Scott, Diane M. (2011). "A new Early Permian reptile and its significance in early diapsid evolution". Proceedings of the Royal Society B. 278 (1725): 3731–3737. doi:10.1098/rspb.2011.0439. PMC 3203498. PMID 21525061.
- Swanson, B. A. & Carlson, K. J. (2002). "Walk, Wade, or Swim? Vertebrate Traces on an Early Permian Lakeshore" (PDF). PALAIOS. 17 (2): 123–133. Bibcode:2002Palai..17..123S. doi:10.1669/0883-1351(2002)017<0123:WWOSVT>2.0.CO;2. S2CID 130593903.
- Thévenin, A. (1910). "Les plus anciens quadrupèdes de France". Annales de Paléontologie. 5: 1–65.
- Vaughn, P. P. (1955). "The Permian reptile Araeoscelis restudied". Bulletin of the Harvard Museum of Comparative Zoology. 113: 305–467.
