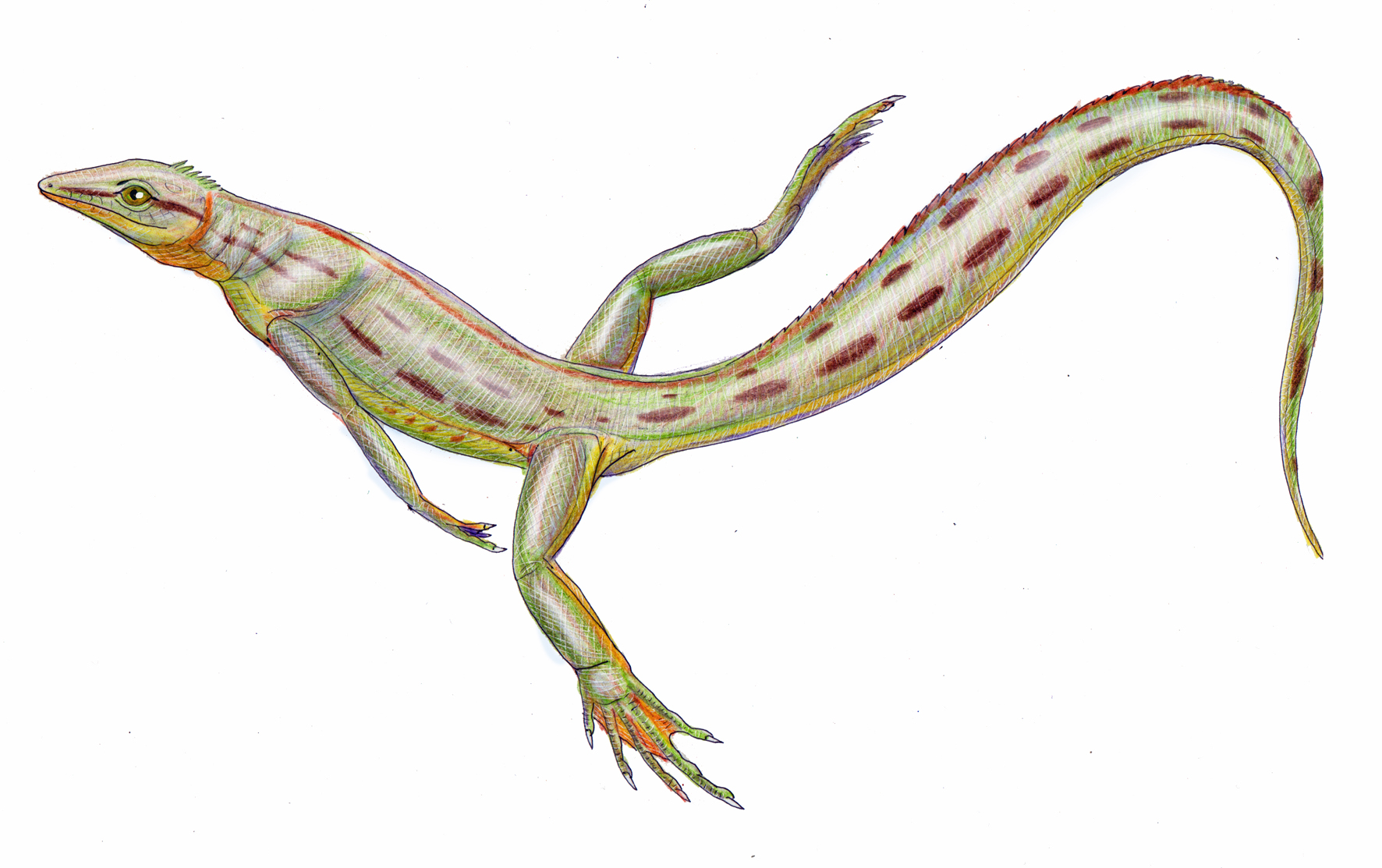
- Restoration

Scientific classification
- Kingdom: Animalia
- Phylum: Chordata
- Order: †Araeoscelidia
- Genus: †Spinoaequalis deBraga & Reisz, 1995

Species
- S. schultzei deBraga & Reisz, 1995 (type)

= Spinoaequalis =

Spinoaequalis Temporal range: Late Carboniferous, 300 Ma

Extinct genus of reptiles

Spinoaequalis is an extinct genus of lizard-like araeoscelidian. It is known from a single species, S. schultzei based on fossils found in Kansas, United States. About 30 cm (1 ft), long it is one of the earliest known amniotes to have returned to the water. Spinoaequalis was not fully aquatic, frequently returning to dry land. It probably swam using its laterally flattened, fanned tail. Its name means "symmetrical spine" referring to its deep, laterally compressed tail. Spinoaequalis was described and named by Michael deBraga and Robert Reisz in 1995.
