= Arroyo Del Agua, New Mexico =

Populated place in New Mexico, U.S.

- Unincorporated community
- Location within the state of New Mexico Arroyo Del Agua (the United States)
- Coordinates: 36°9′34″N 106°39′8″W
- Country: United States
- State: New Mexico
- County: Rio Arriba
- Elevation: 6,834 ft (2,083 m)
- Time zone: UTC-7 (Mountain (MST))
  - Summer (DST): UTC-6 (MDT)
- ZIP codes: 87012
- Area code: 575
- GNIS feature ID: 903323

Arroyo Del Agua, is a populated place in Rio Arriba County, New Mexico, United States. It lies at an elevation of 6,834 feet / 2,083 meters along the north bank of the Rio Puerco, above its confluence with its tributary Salitral Creek.

== History ==
Arroyo Del Agua, is mentioned in the itinerary of Antonio Armijo as a stopping place of his expedition that pioneered his 1829-1830 route of the Old Spanish Trail between Santa Fe, New Mexico and Mission San Gabriel in California.
