= Zarcasaurus =

Scientific classification
- Domain: Eukaryota
- Kingdom: Animalia
- Phylum: Chordata
- Class: Reptilia
- Order: †Araeoscelidia
- Family: †Araeoscelidae
- Genus: †Zarcasaurus; Brinkman et al. 1984

Type species
- †Zarcasaurus tanyderus

Species
- †Zarcasaurus tanyderus

Extinct genus of tetrapods

Zarcasaurus tanyderus is a species of araeoscelidian tetrapods found in the Cutler Formation (Early Permian) of New Mexico. The only elements of the skeleton known from this animal is a partial jaw bone, vertebrae, and broken limb bones.
