= Salitral Formation =

Triassic geologic formation in New Mexico, United States

- Stratigraphic range: Late Triassic
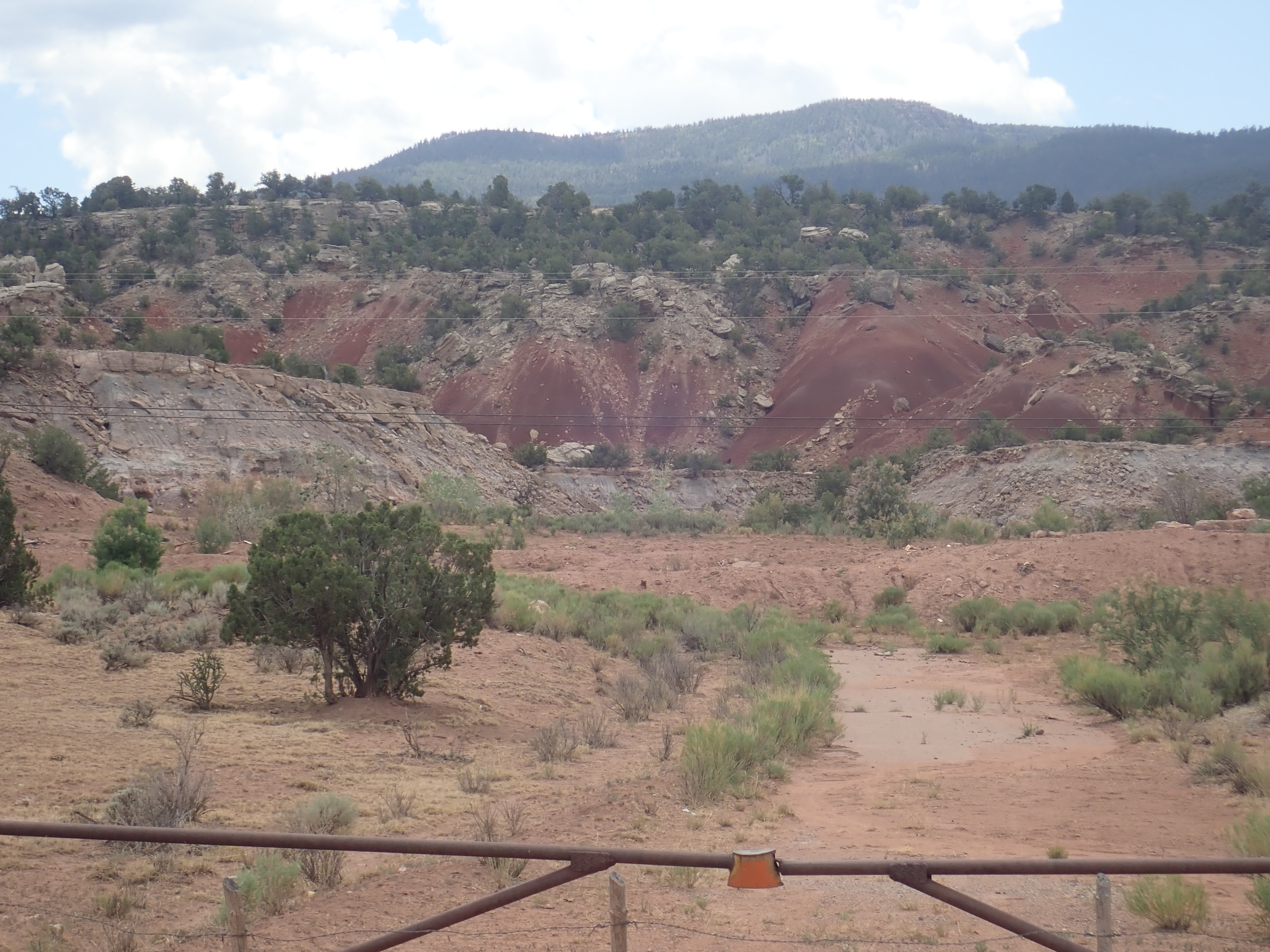
- Salitral Formation at its type section, near Youngsville, New Mexico.
- Type: Formation
- Unit of: Chinle Group
- Sub-units: Piedre Lumbre Member, Youngsville Member
- Underlies: Poleo Formation
- Overlies: Shinarump Conglomerate
- Thickness: 30 m (98 ft)

Lithology
- Primary: Shale

Location
- Coordinates: 36.1765°N 106.6894°W
- Region: New Mexico
- Country: United States

Type section
- Named for: Salitral Creek
- Named by: Wood and Northrop
- Year defined: 1946
- Salitral Formation (the United States) Salitral Formation (New Mexico)

The Salitral Formation is a Late Triassic geologic formation found in north-central New Mexico, primarily the northwestern Jemez Mountains. It is an older subunit of the Chinle Group (or formation), overlying the Shinarump Conglomerate and underlying the Poleo Formation.

== History of investigation ==
The unit was originally designated as the Salitral Shale tongue of the Chinle Formation by Wood and Northrup in 1946, as part of their petroleum survey of the region. It was presumably named for Salitral Creek (36.1764797°N 106.6893804°W). Lucas and Hunt raised it to formation rank in 1992 in the same study in which they raised the Chinle Formation to group rank. Other authors prefer a lower rank, as the Salitral Member of the Chinle Formation.

== Geology ==
The formation consists of variegated mudstone and is assigned to the lower (bentonitic) Chinle Group. The Salitral extensively intertongues with the underlying Shinarump Conglomerate (formerly known in the Jemez as the Agua Zarca Sandstone) and pinches out in the Abiquiu area and in the southern Jemez, where the overlying Poleo Formation rests directly on the Shinarump.

The Salitral Formation is time-equivalent to other Chinle strata found further west, occupying the same stratigraphic position. These include the Bluewater Creek Formation and the Blue Mesa Member in west-central New Mexico, and the Monitor Butte Formation and Blue Mesa Member in southeastern Utah. However, it is not a synonym for any of these formations, being much thinner and having its own distinctive lithology.

The formation is notable for the presence of septarian concretions.

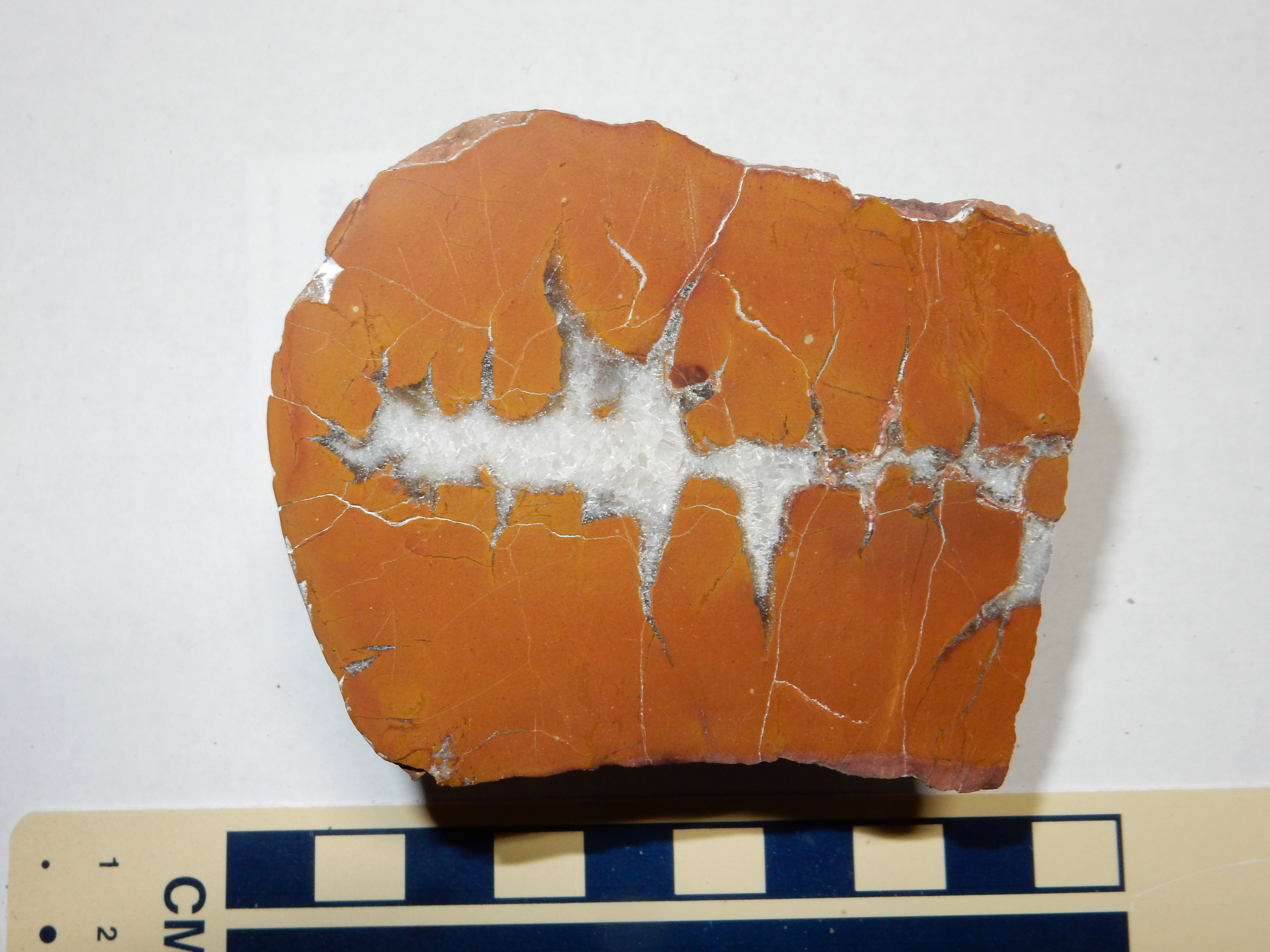
Septarian nodule from the Salitral Formation

=== Members ===
As a formation, the Salitral consists of two members. The lower Piedre Lumbre Member, named for the Piedre Lumbre Land Grant, is sandstone and siltstone, olive gray to brown in color, up to 5 meters (16 feet) thick. It tends to form a green slope immediately above the underlying Shinarump Conglomerate. The upper bed is occasionally prominent as a brownish yellow intraformational conglomerate up to 1.6 meters (5.2 feet) thick. When present, this is designated the El Cerrito Bed. The upper Youngsville Member is reddish brown, bentonitic mudstone up to 26 meters (85 feet) thick. It is named for the nearby village of Youngsville.

== Fossils ==
Tetrapod fossils have been identified in the type section of the Youngsville Member. These include coprolites and indeterminate metoposaurid and phytosaur remains, including a paramedian scute that may be the aetosaur Longosuchus or Desmatosuchus.
