= Rio Puerco (Rio Chama tributary) =

River in Rio Arriba County, New Mexico

Rio Puerco de Chama Rio Coyote
- Location of the mouth of the Rio Puerco de Chama in New Mexico
- Native name: Dáy Pʼohúuˀu, Napʼotaapʼoe (Tewa)

Location
- Country: United States
- State: New Mexico
- County: Rio Arriba

Physical characteristics
- Source
  - location: Nacimiento Mountains
  - coordinates: 36°04′55″N 106°46′12″W
  - elevation: 9,706 ft (2,958 m)
- Mouth: Rio Chama
  - coordinates: 36°15′51″N 106°31′24″W
  - elevation: 6,144 ft (1,873 m)
- Discharge
  - location: USGS gage, miles above mouth
  - minimum: 0 cu ft/s (0 m^{3}/s)

The Rio Puerco de Chama is a tributary of the Rio Chama in the U.S. state of New Mexico. It flows northeast from the Nacimiento Mountains to join the Chama above Abiquiu Lake.

== See also ==
- List of rivers of New Mexico
