= Robert J. Gay =

American Paleontologist

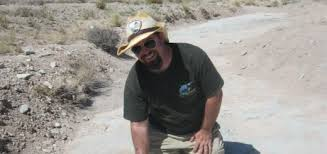
- Robert Gay in June 2016

Education
- Education: University of Arizona

Robert Joseph Gay is an American Paleontologist known for his work in the Chinle and Kayenta Formations in the southwest United States. He is known for his studies of cannibalism in Coelophysis and sexual dimorphism in Dilophosaurus, and his fieldwork in Bears Ears National Monument. In 2017, he and coauthors formally published their study on the oldest known dinosaur from Utah, a neotheropod that is likely an animal similar to Coelophysis. Robert Gay is currently the Curator of Education at the Idaho Museum of Natural History

== Discoveries ==
In the summer of 2015, Gay discovered the first occurrence of Crosbysaurus from the Triassic of Utah. In 2017, Robert Gay and others published their discovery on the oldest known dinosaur from Utah, a small Coelophysis-like neotheropod from the Upper Triassic Chinle Formation.

== Publications and Abstracts ==
Gay, R. J., Huttenlocker, A. K., Irmis, R.B., Stegner, M.A., & Uglesich, J. (2020). Paleontology of Bears Ears National Monument (Utah, USA): History of exploration, study, and designation. Geology of the Intermountain West, 7, 205-241.

Jenkins, Xavier A.; Foster, John R.; Gay, Robert J. First unambiguous dinosaur specimen from the Upper Triassic Chinle formation in Utah. Geology of the Intermountain West, [S.l.], v. 4, p. 231-242, Dec. 2017. ISSN 2380-7601.

Gay RJ, Aude IS. (2015). The first occurrence of the enigmatic archosauriform Crosbysaurus Heckert 2004 from the Chinle Formation of southern Utah.

Gay, Robert (2001). "New specimens of Dilophosaurus wetherilli (Dinosauria: Theropoda) from the early Jurassic Kayenta Formation of northern Arizona". Western Association of Vertebrate Paleontologists annual meeting volume Mesa, Arizona 1: 1.

Gay, Robert (2005). "Evidence for sexual dimorphism in the Early Jurassic theropod dinosaur, Dilophosaurus and a comparison with other related forms In: Carpenter, Ken, ed. The Carnivorous Dinosaurs". The Carnivorous Dinosaurs. Indiana University Press. pp. 277–283. ISBN 0-253-34539-1.

Gay, R.J. (2001). "An unusual adaptation in the caudal vertebrae of Coelophysis bauri (Dinosauria: Theropoda)". PaleoBios 21: 55.

Lockley, Martin G.; Gierlinski, Gerard D.; Houck, Karen; Lim, Jong-Deock; Kim, Kyung Soo; Kim, Dal-Yong; Kim, Tae Hyeong; Kang, Seung-Hyeop; Hunt-Foster, ReBecca; Li, Rihui; Chesser, Christopher; Gay, Rob; Dubicka, Zofia; Cart, Ken; Wright, Kristy. 2014 “New Excavations at the Mill Canyon Dinosaur Track Site (Cedar Mountain Formation, Lower Cretaceous) of eastern Utah In Lockley and Lucas, eds., Fossil footprints of western North America. New Mexico Museum of Natural History and Science Bulletin no. 62, pp 287–300.
