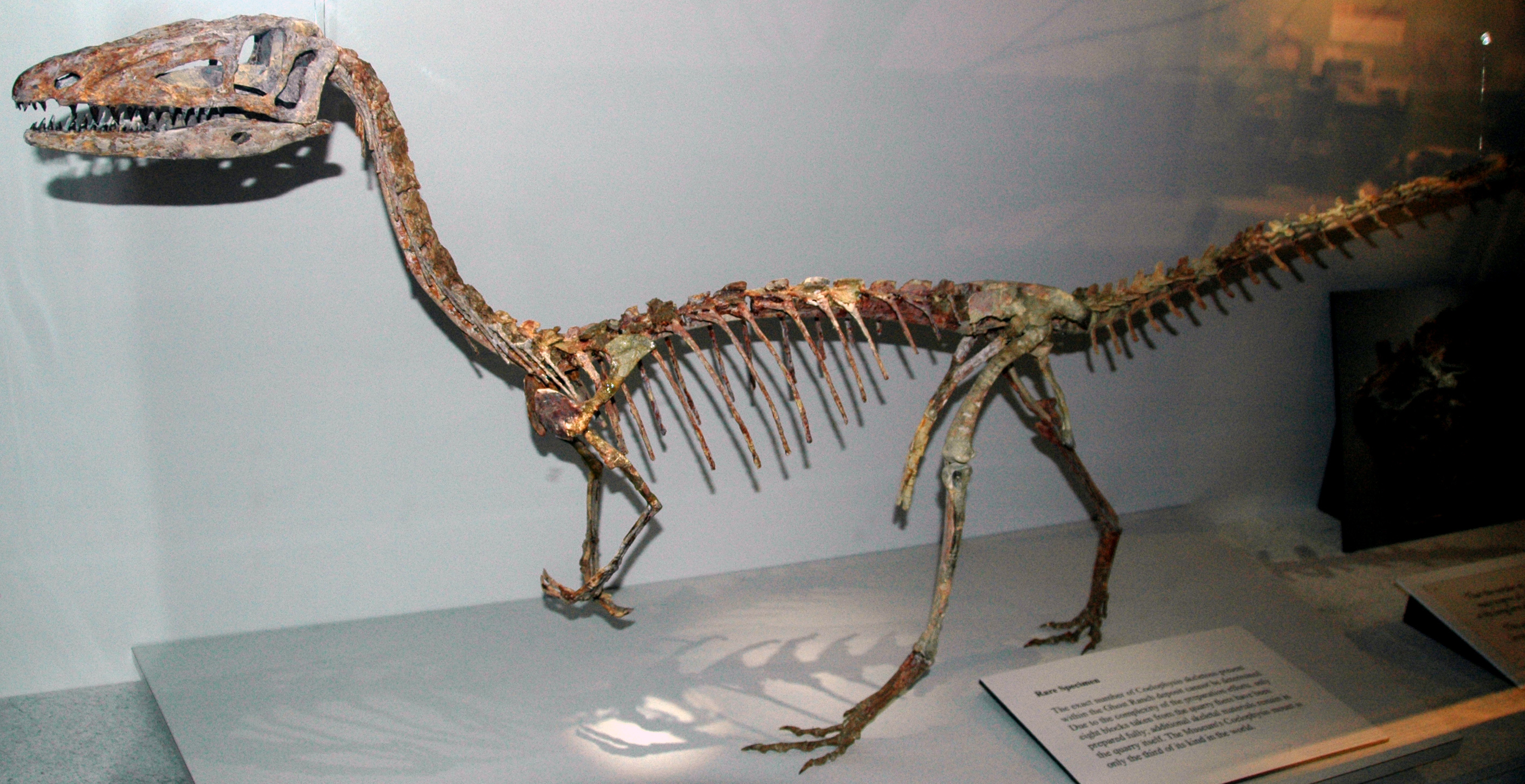
- Mounted skeleton at the Cleveland Museum of Natural History

Scientific classification
- Kingdom: Animalia
- Phylum: Chordata
- Class: Reptilia
- Clade: Dinosauria
- Clade: Saurischia
- Clade: Theropoda
- Family: †Coelophysidae
- Genus: †Coelophysis; Cope, 1889

Type species
- †Coelurus bauri Cope, 1887a

Synonyms
- Genus synonymy: Longosaurus Welles, 1984; Rioarribasaurus Hunt & Lucas, 1991; Synonyms of C. bauri: Coelurus bauri Cope, 1887a; Tanystrophaeus bauri (Cope, 1887a) Cope, 1887b; Rioarribasaurus colberti Hunt & Lucas, 1991; Syntarsus colberti (Hunt & Lucas, 1991) Paul, 1993; Dubious species designations: Coelurus longicollis Cope, 1887a; Tanystrophaeus longicollis (Cope, 1887a) Cope, 1887b; Coelophysis longicollis (Cope, 1887a) Cope, 1889; Longosaurus longicollis Welles, 1984; Tanystrophaeus willistoni Cope, 1887b; Coelophysis willistoni (Cope, 1887b) Cope, 1889

= Coelophysis =

Coelophysis Temporal range: Late Triassic (Norian)

Genus of theropod dinosaurs from the late Triassic

Coelophysis is an extinct genus of coelophysid theropod dinosaurs that lived approximately 215 to 201.4 million years ago during the late Triassic period from the middle Norian to Rhaetian age in what is now the southwestern United States. Megapnosaurus was once considered to be a species within this genus, but this interpretation has been challenged and the genus Megapnosaurus is now considered valid.

Coelophysis was a small, slenderly built, ground-dwelling, bipedal carnivore that could grow up to 3 m (9.8 ft) long. It is one of the earliest known dinosaur genera. Scattered material representing similar animals has been found worldwide in some Late Triassic and Early Jurassic formations.

The type species C. bauri, originally placed in the genus Coelurus by Edward Drinker Cope in 1887, was described by the latter in 1889. The names Longosaurus and Rioarribasaurus are synonymous with Coelophysis. Coelophysis is one of the most specimen-rich dinosaur genera.

== History of discovery ==
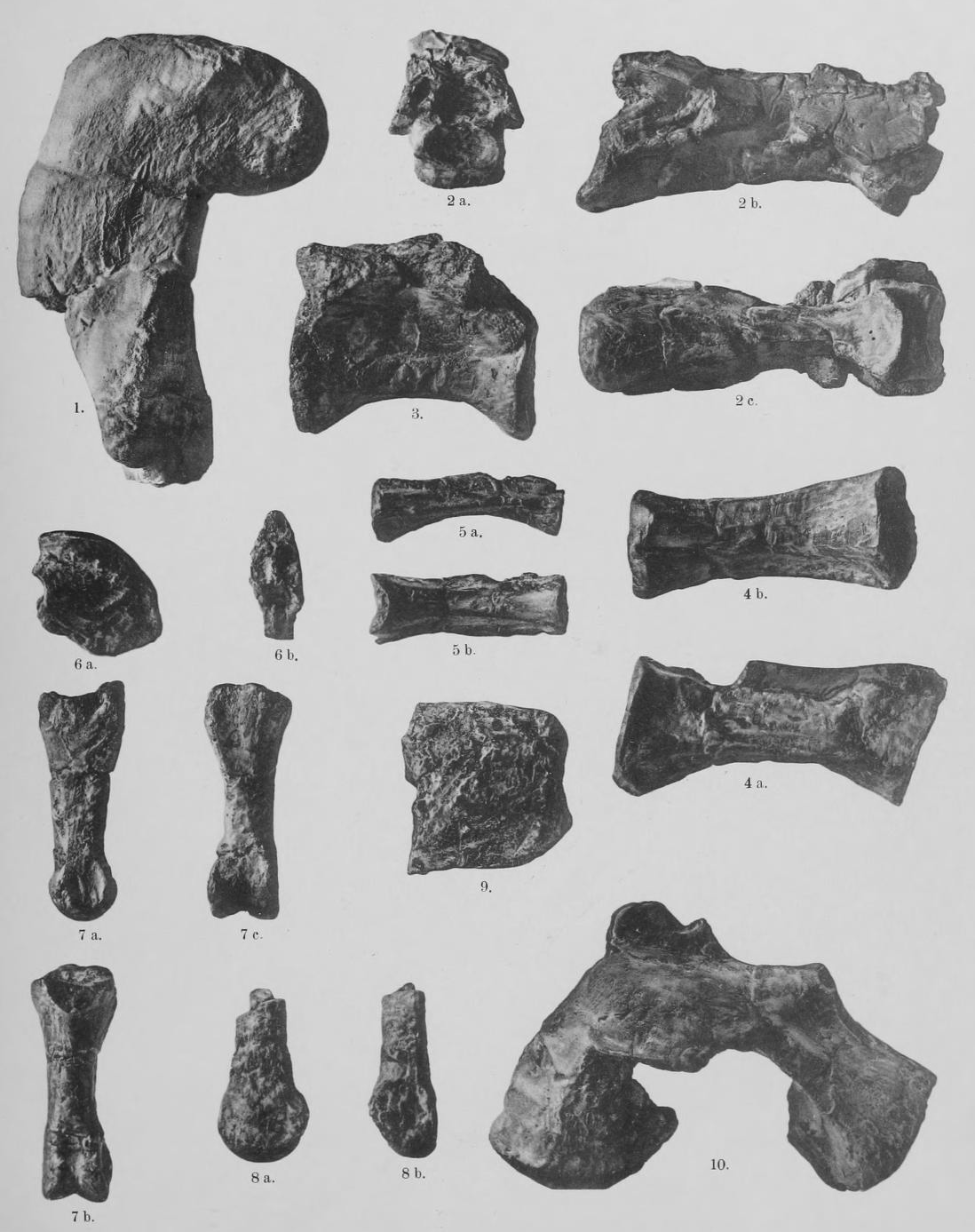
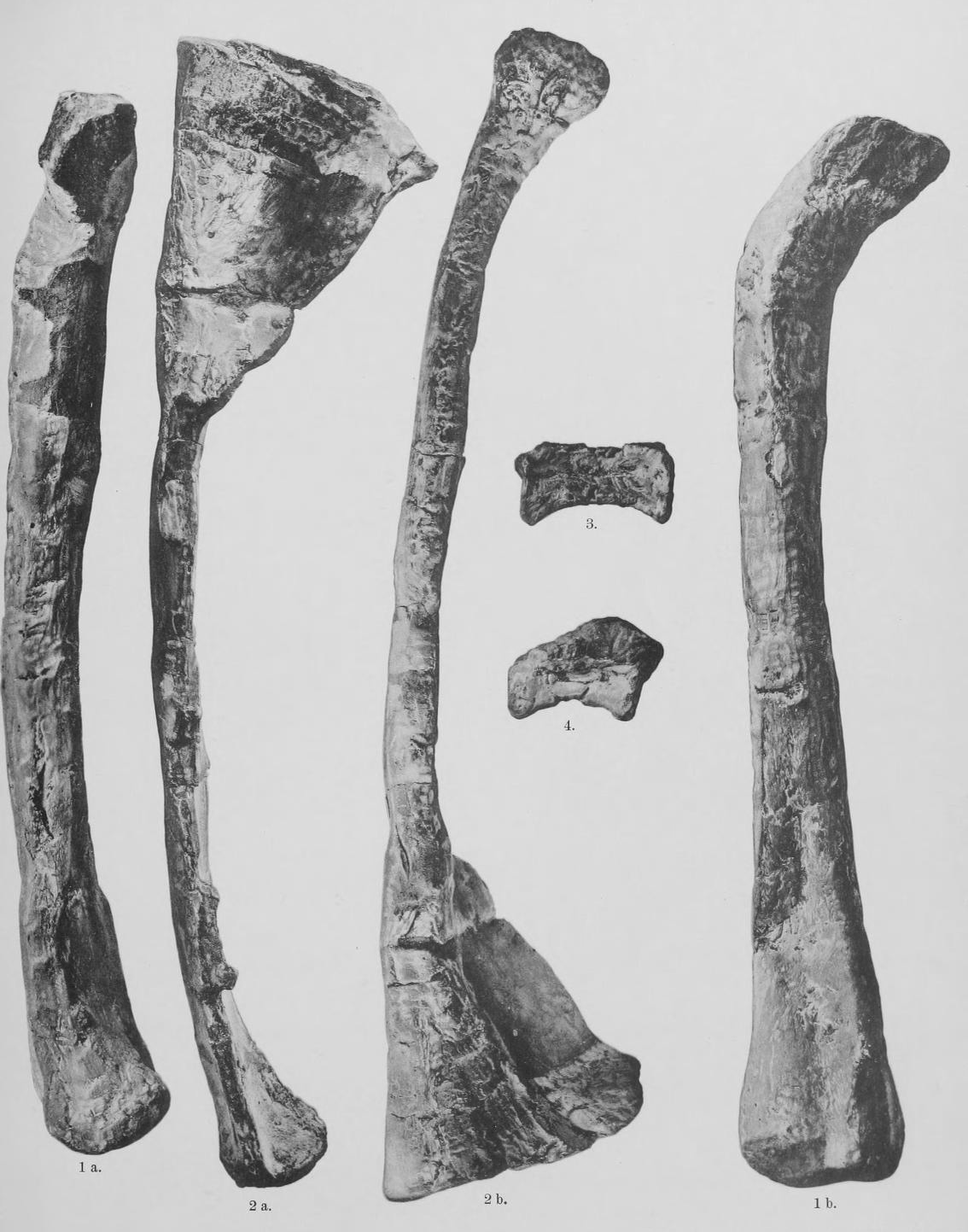
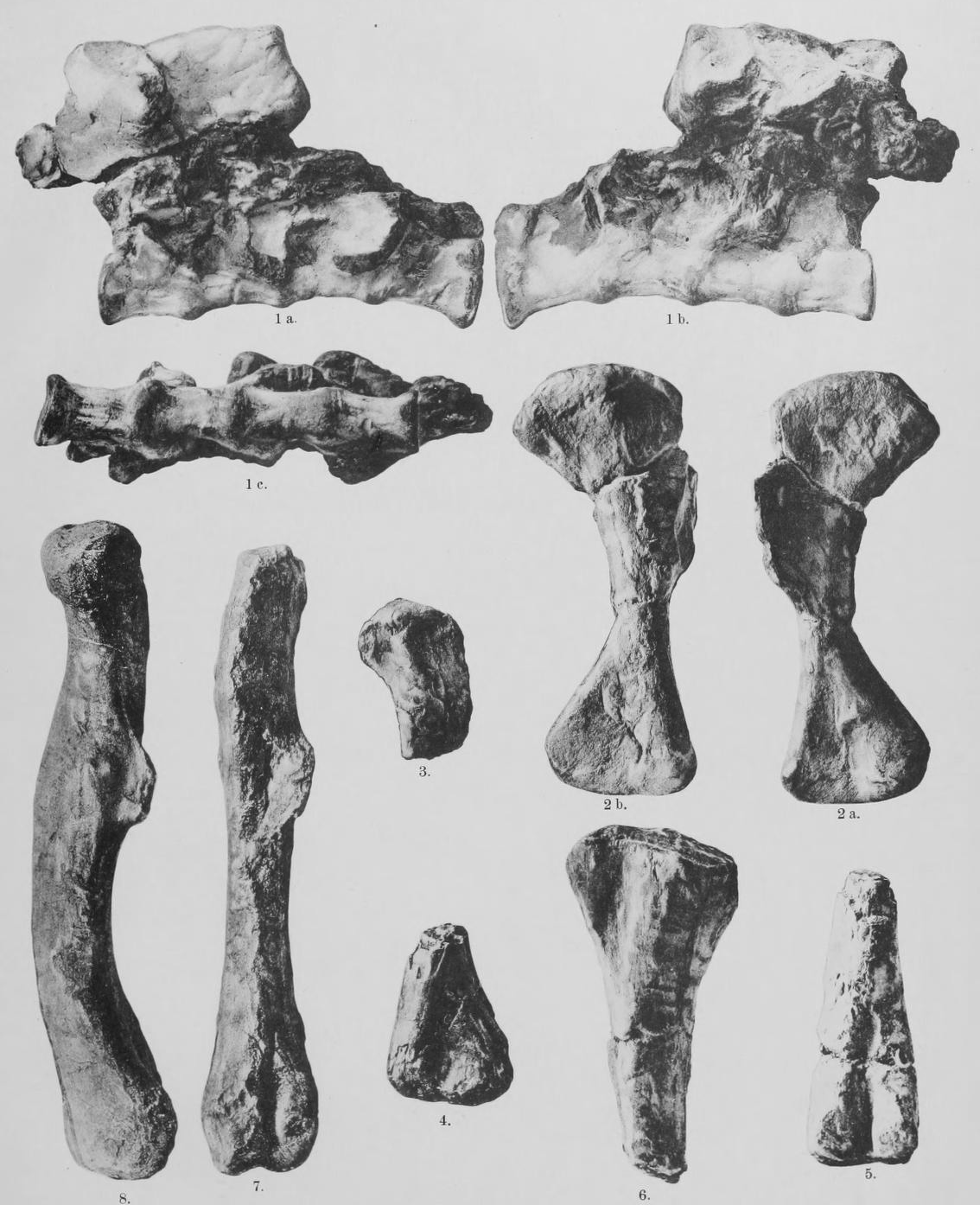
Original materials of the Coelophysis species (excluding Euskelosaurus femur in top left and Hortalotarsus limb bones bottom right)

In April of 1887 American paleontologist Edward Drinker Cope first described vertebrate remains from the Triassic of New Mexico as new species of the genus Coelurus, including nearly all parts of the skeleton except the skull and teeth. While Coelurus had been considered by its describer Othniel Charles Marsh as an uncertain type of reptile, the new material described by Cope demonstrated that it was a dinosaur, and likely closely related to Megadactylus (now Anchisaurus) from the Triassic of Massachusetts. Cope chose to name two new species from his collection of New Mexican material, the first being Coelurus longicollis for multiple vertebrae and a femur, (Note: AMNH 2701 (cervical vertebra), 2715 (dorsal vertebra, 2702 (caudal vertebra), and 2704 (femur)) while the second was Coelurus bauri, named after German paleontologist Georg Baur, included the same regions of the skeleton. (Note: AMNH 2717 (cervical vertebra), 2722 (sacrum), and 2725 (partial femur)) Following this description, Cope reclassified his New Mexican material in July 1887 from Coelurus to the German taxon Tanystrophaeus based on the similarities of the vertebrae, creating the new combinations Tanystrophaeus longicollis and Tanysteophaeus bauri. Cope described additional material of both T. longicollis (Note: AMNH 2735 (caudal), 2708 (ilium), 2705 (ilium), 2706 (pubis), 2716 (ischium), 2707 (phalanx), and 2703 (ungual)) and T. bauri (Note: AMNH 2720 (cervical), 2723 (dorsal), 2724 (partial pubis), 2719 (partial ischium), 2718 (partial ischium), and 2721 (tibia)) to cover more of the anatomy of both species, and he also named the new species Tanystrophaeus willistoni for a partial pelvis even smaller than both other species, named after American paleontologist Samuel Wendell Williston. (Note: AMNH 2726 (ilium), and 2727 (dorsal)) Following this, Cope came to the realization that the vertebrae of Tanystrophaeus he considered similar to the New Mexican species were not definitively caudal vertebrae, and as a result the species were in need of a new genus name. As a result, in 1889 Cope described the new genus Coelophysis, with three species C. longicollis, C. bauri, and C. willistoni, the name being a combination of the Ancient Greek words κοῖλος (koilos), "hollow", and φύσεις (fysis), "form".

The original material of Coelophysis described by Cope was all collected by David Baldwin in 1881 from three localities of Rio Arriba County, New Mexico, with the only surviving collection information being labels written by Baldwin associated with the specimens, indicating a provenance of 120 m (400 ft) below a gypsum layer at "Arroyo Seco" and "Gallina Canyon". The layer of gypsum identified by Baldwin is now known as part of the Middle Jurassic Todilto Formation that overlies the Chinle Formation within the region of Ghost Ranch that "Arroyo Seco" (Arroyo Canjilon or Canjilon Creek) flows past, so while no other information on the area Baldwin collected can be known for certain, he must have collected from within a 4.8 km (3 mi) region around Ghost Ranch where the river cuts through the Chinle Formation below the Todilto gypsum layer. Williston and Ermine Cowles Case believed they located the area of Baldwin's collecting in a 1912 visit to the region where they located fragments they assigned to Coelophysis on the surface.

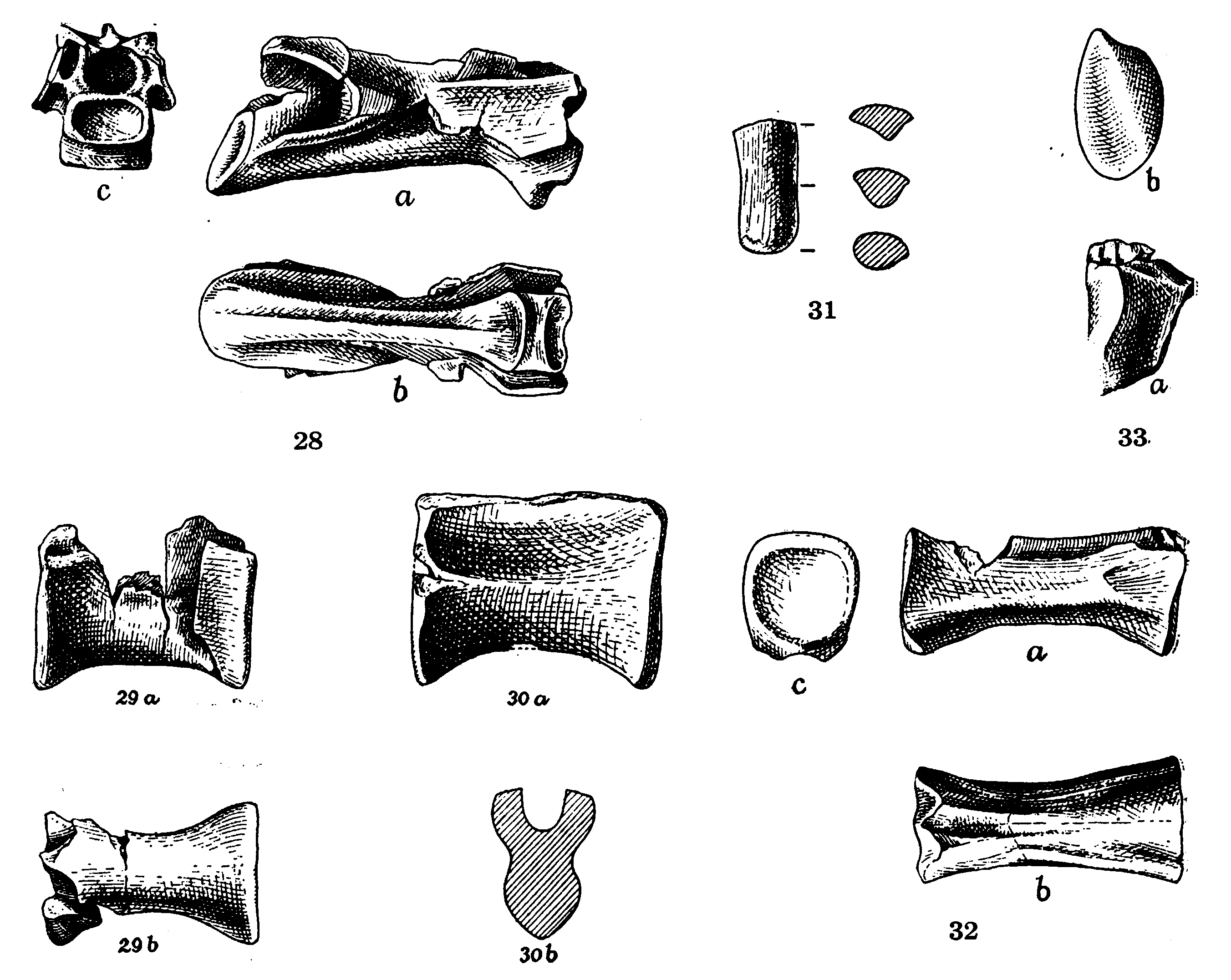
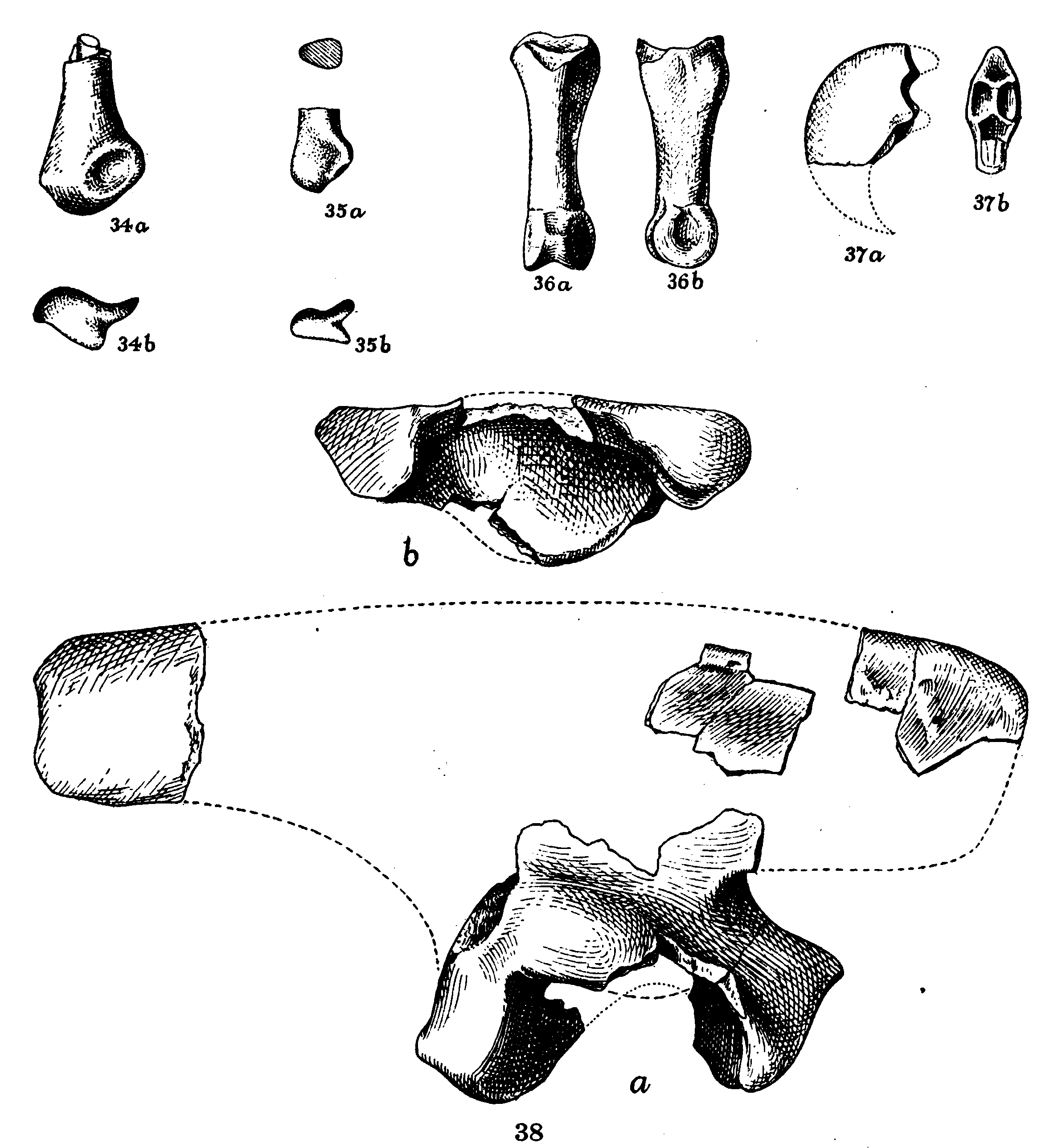
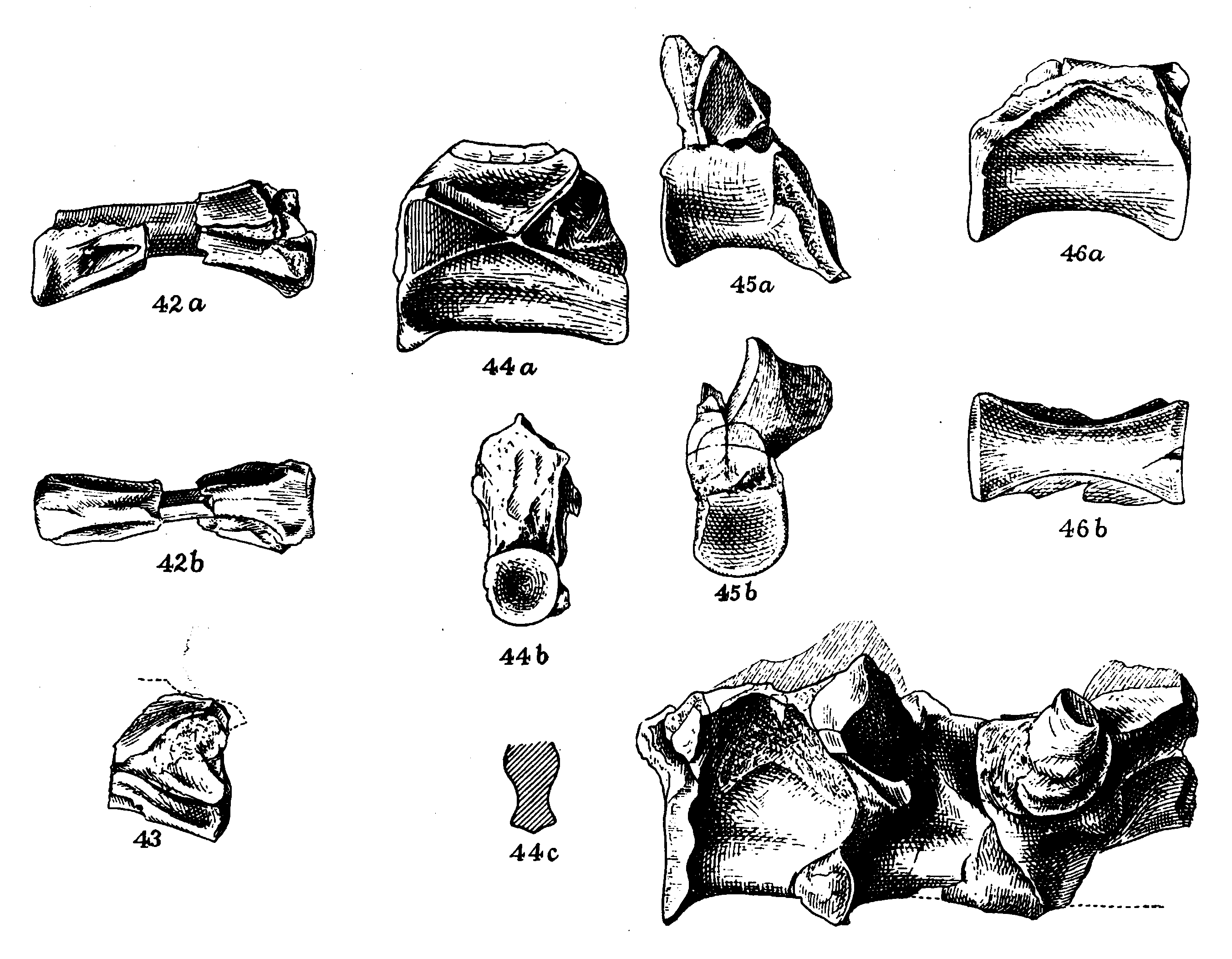
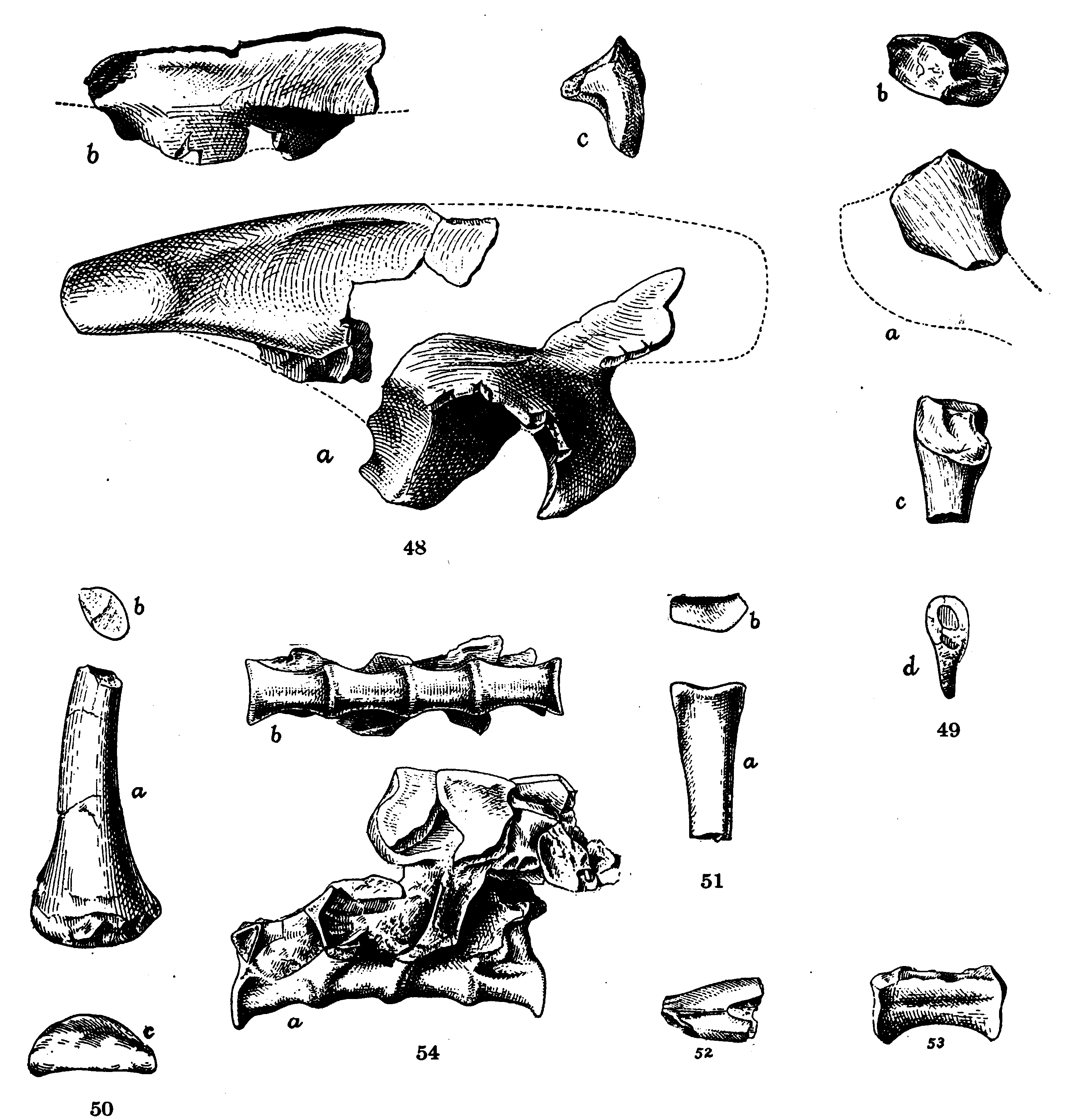
Illustrations of C. longicollis (top), C. bauri (bottom), and C. willistoni (bottom right) fossils by Huene

The German paleontologist Friedrich von Huene revisited the material and taxonomy of Coelophysis in a 1906 review of Triassic dinosaurs, following the species identifications of Cope and illustrating the material for the first time, with the additional description of elements of the hand of C. longicollis and vertebrae of C. bauri that Cope had not described. (Note: AMNH 2730 (metacarpal III of C. longicollis), and 2744 (dorsal of C. bauri)) Huene did not see justification in considering Coelophysis a close relative of Anchisaurus (a replacement name for Megadactylus), instead classifying the genus within Coeluridae. In a further 1915 review limited to the New Mexican collection of Cope, Huene separated the specimens into the three species differently from previously, assigning bones based on size with C. longicollis as the largest species and C. willistoni as the smallest and suggesting that more than three species may be present. No type species for Coelophysis was designated by Huene, nor were specimen numbers identified, complicating the assignment of material to the species. In 1986 American paleontologist Kevin Padian revisited the type material of Coelophysis and identified which material was referred to which species by Cope and Huene in their studies, and identified some material in the Cope collection that had yet to be described. (Note: AMNH 2732, 2742-43, 2746-2748, and 2753, all fragments)

=== Ghost Ranch discoveries ===
During the summer of 1946, American paleontologist Edwin H. Colbert began searching for Triassic fossils in the Petrified Forest National Park of northern Arizona, under the employment of the American Museum of Natural History. This exploration continued the following year, where Colbert planned to stop at Ghost Ranch on the way to Petrified Forest, where many skulls of phytosaurs had been found. Colbert, along with George Simpson, Bill Fish, George Whitaker, and Tom Ierardi, were the field crew for the 1947 season, with Simpson and Fish focusing on Eocene mammals of northern New Mexico while Colbert, Whitaker, and Ierardi would continue to northern Arizona for Triassic reptiles. On 21 June, Colbert, Whitaker and Ierardi began exploring the sediments of the Chinle Formation in the area near Ghost Ranch, uncovering a complete phytosaur skull, and on 22 June Whitaker discovered some fragments including a claw that Colbert identified as Coelophysis, from a talus slope above an intermittent stream. Upon excavating bones on the surface and removing some of the talus, a fossil layer was found containing numerous Coelophysis bones. After several more days of excavations, it was understood that the fossil layer contained hundreds of skeletons of Coelophysis in a single concentration, and upon the return of Simpson and Fish to the locality the former stated that "this was the greatest find ever made in the Triassic of North America".

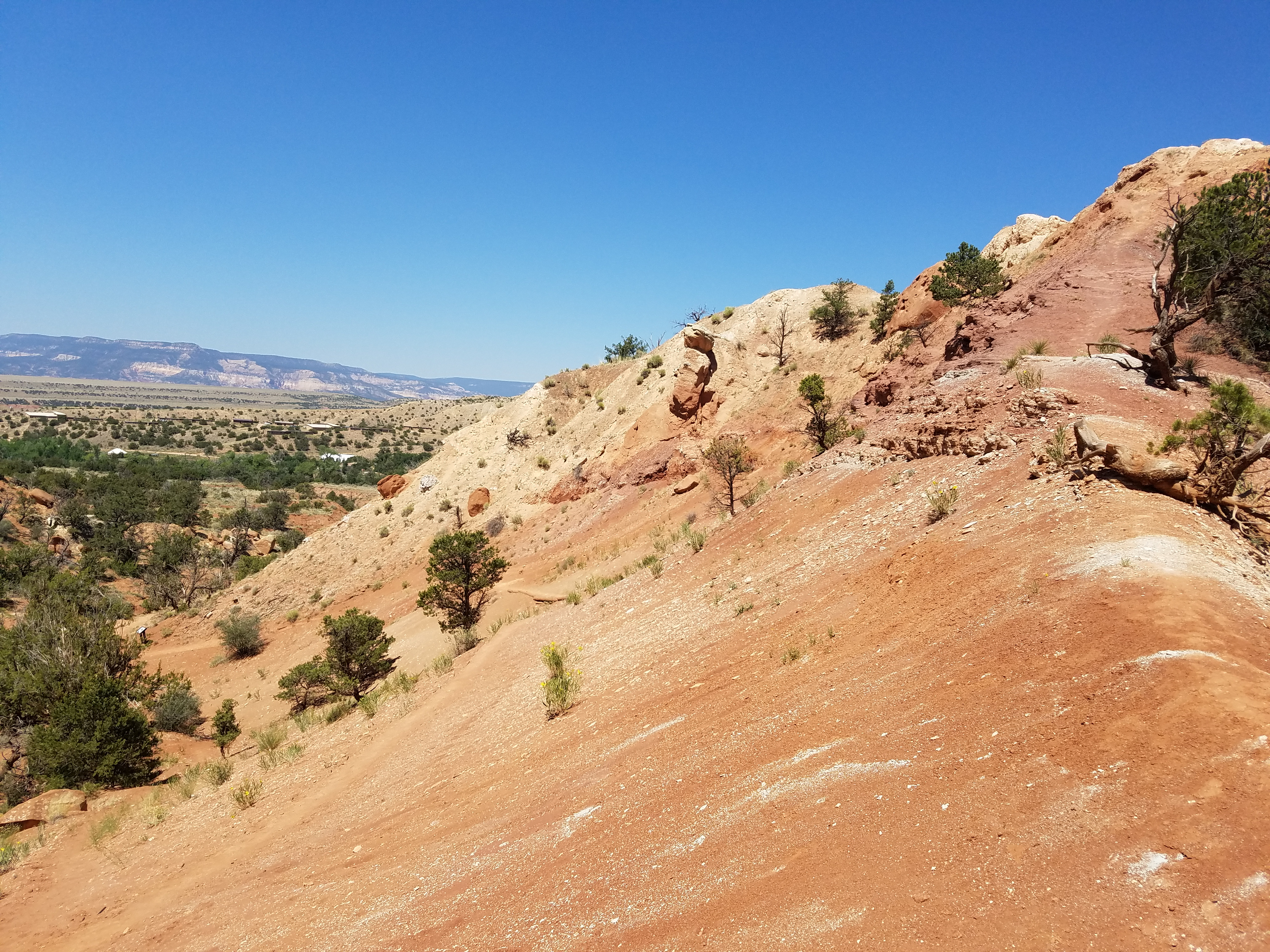
The famed Coelophysis quarry of Ghost Ranch, as it appeared in 2019

Excavations of the Ghost Ranch Coelophysis quarry were continued throughout 1947 and 1948 by the crew of the AMNH, which also included Carl Sorensen after arrival from New York City, assisted by the landowners Arthur and Phoebe Pack and farm hand Herman Hall. Seven large blocks were excavated, each containing numerous skeletons, numbered I to VI for identification of location when transported back to the AMNH. Around 105 smaller blocks were also collected, created by the channels excavated to separate the larger blocks. A further 6 blocks, VII to XIII, were excavated as the quarry expanded to several meters in diameter, with the blocks being distributed amongst the AMNH, Museum of Northern Arizona, New Mexico Museum of Natural History, and Yale Peabody Museum. All of the excavations at Ghost Ranch took place within the upper sandstone level of the Chinle Formation, believed to be Norian in age at the time and making the expanse of Coelophysis one of the longest deposits within the Chinle despite being one of the earliest known dinosaurs. Colbert believed that the original material of Coelophysis may have been collected from the surface in a similar method to Whitaker's discovery, as part of the same fossil layer that was excavated by the AMNH.

Upon completion of the AMNH excavations at Ghost Ranch at the end of 1948 the quarry was abandoned, with the hillside above slumping down to cover the dig site, and the land itself gifted to the Presbyterian Church. After 32 years in this state, American paleontologist David Berman of the Carnegie Museum of Natural History approached Reverend Jim Hall of Ghost Ranch to propose reopening of the dinosaur quarry with the intention of collecting a specimen for display in the museum. Hall agreed to reopen the quarry on the condition that Colbert and the recently opened New Mexico Museum of Natural History would both participate, with the MNA, YPM and University of Toronto additionally contributing to the efforts. The quarry was worked from 1981 to 1982, with 16 large blocks of 6 to 10 short tons (5.4 to 9.1 t) excavated, and all but one block being removed. The last block remained at the site until 1985 when it was moved by American paleontologist David Gillette to the new Ruth Hall Museum of Paleontology at Ghost Ranch. Blocks from both collections were distributed by the primary institutions through trades and sale to be distributed across all of North America, and eventually even other continents.

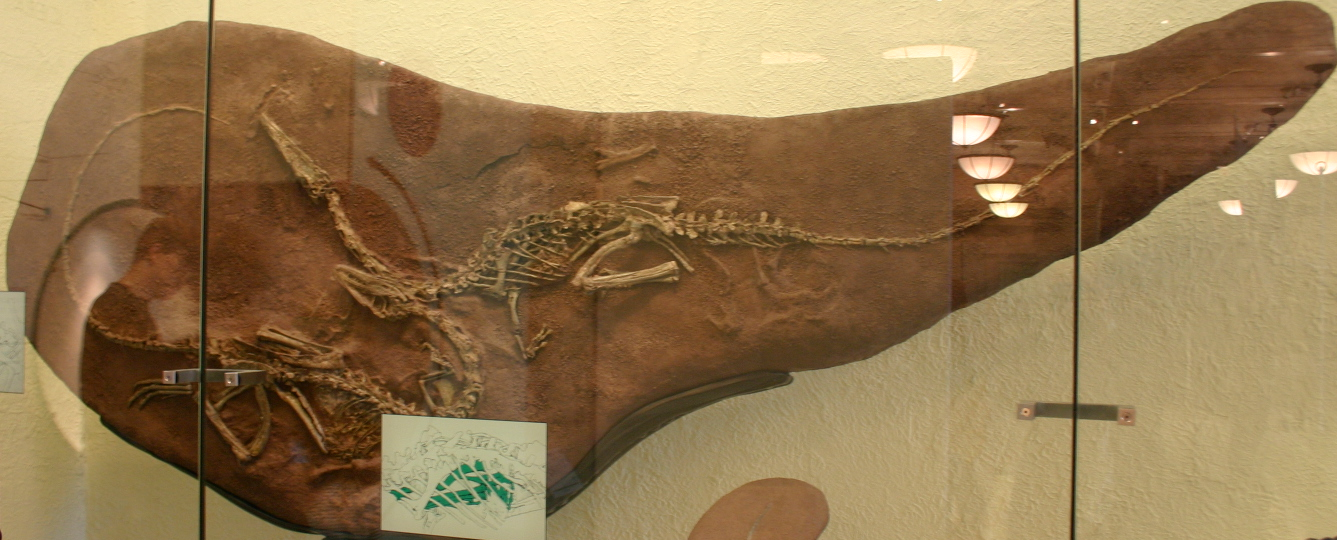
Two Ghost Ranch specimens preserved together, AMNH 7223 and 7224

A monograph on Coelophysis was then published by Colbert in 1989, focusing primarily on the material collected by him at the AMNH but supplemented by material in various other institutions. Under the belief that the material of Baldwin was found near at the same locality as the dinosaur quarry, Colbert diagnosed Coelophysis using the anatomy of the complete skeletons he had excavated, and considered C. bauri the senior synonym of C. longicollis and C. willistoni, with the partial sacrum AMNH 2722 as the lectotype of the species. C. longicollis had been believed by American paleontologist Samuel P. Welles to be a different genus than Coelophysis, which he had named Longosaurus in 1984 after American paleontologist Robert A. Long. All of the Ghost Ranch material was thus described as part of a single species known from hundreds of individuals of various ages and sizes, with some additional variation in proportions of individuals at the same size that gave the suggestion of a "robust" and "gracile" morph. While Colbert considered Coelophysis to be diagnostic, this opinion was not shared in other reviews of early theropods, where Padian instead considered it a "metataxon" or otherwise lacking unique characteristics of its own and having anatomy primitive to Theropoda. Padian believed that as Coelophysis was founded in scrappy and incomplete material, it is difficult to justify the referrals of additional material to the taxon. He still considered Coelophysis a useful taxonomic entity, being characterized by the lack of more derived traits common to other theropods, and as a result a partial skeleton from Petrified Forest, and the theropods Avipes, Podokesaurus, Procompsognathus, and Trialestes could be considered referrable to Coelophysis.

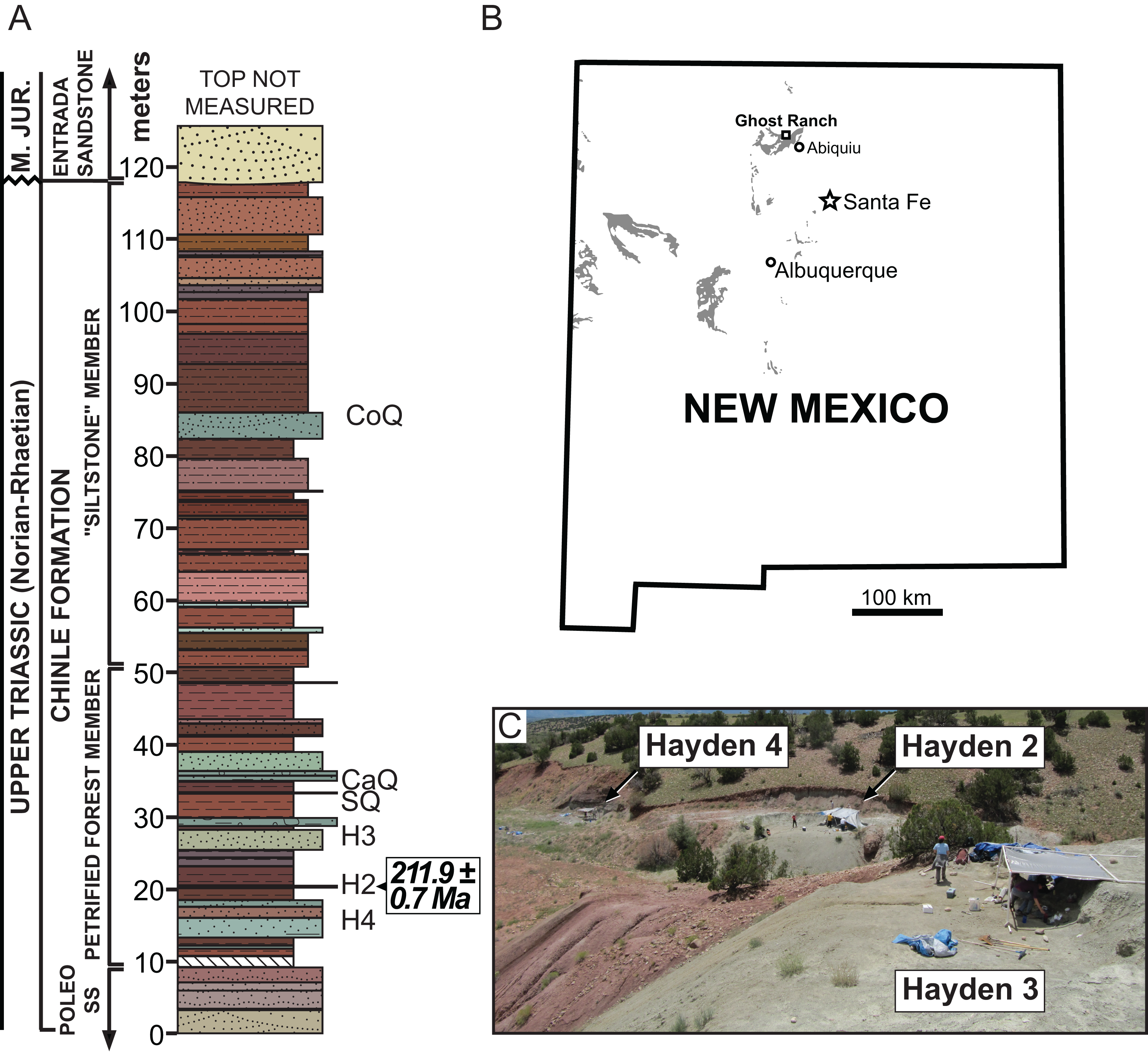
Stratigraphic section around Ghost Ranch showing the level of the Coelophysis Quarry (CoQ) relative to other localities

American paleontologists Adrian P. Hunt and Spencer G. Lucas went further than Padian, declaring Coelophysis a nomen dubium as its type material could not be distinguished from other theropods. As a result, they determined that a new taxon was required for the very complete specimens from Ghost Ranch (what they referred to as the Whitaker Quarry), for which they named Rioarribasaurus colberti. The genus name referred to the Rio Arriba County where the fossils were discovered, while the species name was in honor of Colbert for his work excavating and describing the material. Hunt and Lucas also designated a lectotype for C. longicollis as the specimen chosen by Welles as its type was invalid, identifying that the cervical AMNH 2701 should be used to identify the species. A lectotype was also designated for C. willistoni, the partial ilium AMNH 2726. None of the material of the three species was believed by Hunt and Lucas to bear any unique characteristics that could support their synonymy to C. bauri or any other theropod. The complete skeleton AMNH 7224, mounted on display at the museum, was selected as the holotype of Rioarribasaurus, and all the Ghost Ranch specimens collected from 1947 to 1982 were referred to the taxon as they lacked differences beyond sexual or growth-related variation.

In a following study in 1996, Hunt and Lucas as well as American paleontologists Robert M. Sullivan and Andrew Heckert established that the locality where Baldwin collected Coelophysis was not the same deposit or level as the dinosaur quarry as Colbert had believed. The color and concretions attached to the bones Baldwin collected differs from those of the specimens named Rioarribasaurus, but was instead identical to material found at a separate cluster of sites along Arroyo Seco 120 m (400 ft) below the Todilto Formation. The Baldwin localities would therefore be from the region of Orphan Mesa 3 km (1.9 mi) southeast of the dinosaur quarry, and from older deposits equivalent to the Canjilon Quarry and aetosaur quarry where Pseudopalatus and Typothorax are known. According to the stratigraphy of Sullivan, Lucas and colleagues, Coelophysis would therefore be from the Revueltian-age Petrified Forest Formation, with Rioarribasaurus from the Apachean-age Rock Point Formation. Additional collected material (Note: Partial skeletons, isolated bones, and fragments NMMNH P-22298, SMP VP-453, 456, 462, 465, 469, 476, 478, 487, and 491) from these relocated sites was used as justification for Coelophysis being a distinct taxon separated from Rioarribasaurus, showing differences in the pubis, femur, and metatarsals. The stratigraphic divisions of Lucas for the Chinle are not supported by other paleontologists, who instead place the Coelophysis quarry within a "siltstone member" of the Chinle Formation with a Rhaetian age, with the Baldwin sites as part of the Petrified Forest Member radiometrically dated to 211.9±0.7 million years ago in the late Norian.

Since the numerous well-preserved Ghost Ranch specimens were used as Coelophysis in most of the scientific literature as well as public mentions, the introduction of Rioarribasaurus would have caused much confusion. As such, Colbert and other paleontologists petitioned to the International Commission on Zoological Nomenclature to replace the lectotype of Coelophysis bauri with AMNH 7224 as a neotype, thereby making Coelophysis bauri and Rioarribasaurus colberti objective synonyms, giving Coelophysis a much better type specimen, and preserving the use of Coelophysis for the Ghost Ranch material as it had been since its discovery in 1947. They emphasised their belief that the Ghost Ranch quarry was from approximately the same level and place as the original collection, as well as that the lectotype sacrum of C. bauri belonged to the same taxon as AMNH 7224 as justification for the neotype. The petition was met with opposing comments by Hunt, Lucas, and Sullivan, as well as Welles, George Olshevsky, and Philip Huber, on the grounds of stratigraphic and possibly anatomical differences between the original material and more complete specimens, and that the synonymy of Rioarribasaurus and Coelophysis should be established through anatomy rather than by ruling, while it was supported by paleontologists including Hans-Dieter Sues, Thomas R. Holtz Jr., Farish Jenkins, Ralph Molnar, Elizabeth Nicholls, Louis L. Jacobs, who presented views of the common use of Coelophysis, the potential that the stratigraphic and anatomical differences suggested were invalid, and the belief that a replacement of the type by a better specimen helps with the continued use of taxa over time even when originally diagnostic material is later shown to be inadequate. American paleoartist Gregory S. Paul also published in 1993 the opinion that Coelophysis was indeterminate, but that Rioarribasaurus and Syntarsus belonged to the same genus, creating the combination Syntarsus colberti. In the end, the ICZN voted in 1996 to designate the complete specimen AMNH 7224 as the neotype of Coelophysis and disposed of the name Rioarribasaurus, declaring the latter a nomen rejectum, or "rejected name". The name Coelophysis became a nomen conservandum ("conserved name"), and thus the confusion and uncertainty surrounding the status of Coelophysis was resolved.

=== Formerly assigned material and taxa ===
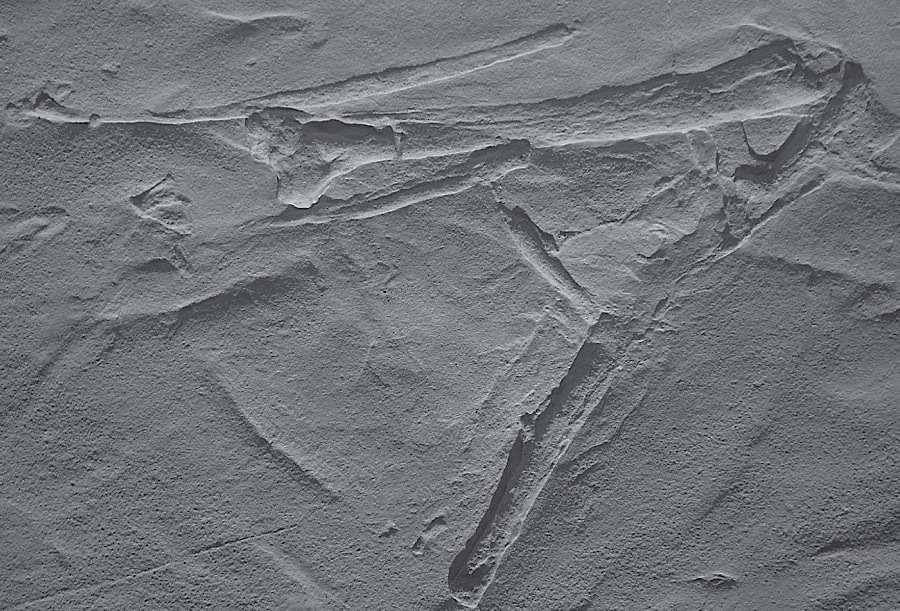
Bone impression BSNH 13656 referred to Coelophysis and then Podokesaurus

In 1922 Case described the first supposed material of Coelophysis from outside New Mexico with the referral of a series of vertebrae he collected in 1921 from Dockum Formation of Crosby County, Texas. The specimen, UMMP No. 7507, was considered by Case as an indeterminate species of Coelophysis, with similarities in the elongation to both Coelophysis and Anchisaurus. Huene did not agree with the referral by case, naming the new coelurosaur genus Spinosuchus for the material. The greatest difference from Coelophysis was in the elongate neural spines, but he also referred a partial braincase from the same region that shows differences from the only other comparable braincase, that of Thecodontosaurus. Redescription of Spinosuchus in 2009 showed that it was separate from Coelophysis and not even a theropod, being a member of the early archosauriform group Trilophosauridae.

Following the rediscovery of a specimen containing the bone impressions of an early dinosaur by Colbert and Donald Baird in 1958, Coelophysis was first compared to Podokesaurus as potentially synonymous. BSNH No. 13656 was found in the in 1864 from possibly-Triassic sediments of Connecticut, probably the Portland Formation, and remained undescribed until the work of Colbert and Baird. Podokesaurus had been named in 1911 by American paleontologist Mignon Talbot for a partial skeleton from the Portland Formation with the only species P. holyokensis, the same deposits which bore the BSNH specimen. Comparisons between the BSNH specimen, Podokesaurus, and Coelophysis showed that they all differed minimally in the limb material in common, with Colbert and Baird assigning BSNH 13656 to an indeterminate Coelophysis species and suggesting that Podokesaurus may not be valid. This was followed up by Colbert in 1964 where he proposed that Podokesaurus should be considered a junior synonym of Coelophysis and created the new combination C. holyokensis, to which he also referred the BSNH specimen. In his 1989 monograph, Colbert no longer followed this synonymy, finding that the shared similarities were widespread throughout podokesaurids; though some later authors considered Podokesaurus a synonym, most now consider it as an indeterminate or potentially undiagnostic taxon.

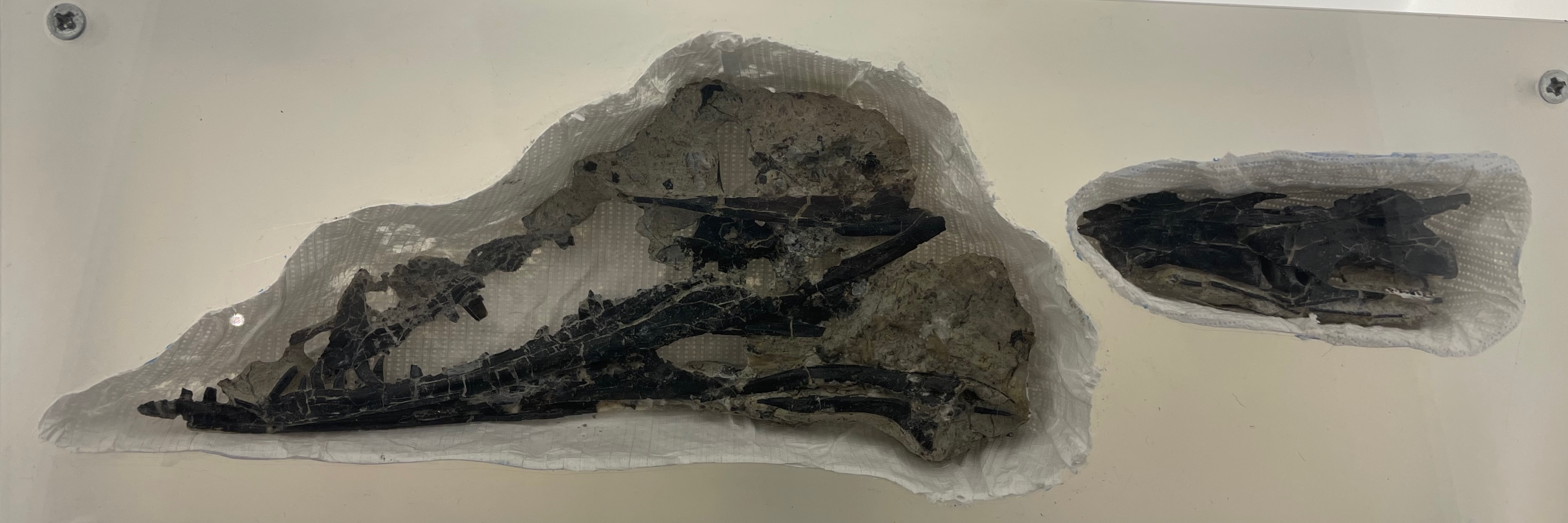
Partial skull and cervical vertebrae of the Snyder Quarry coelophysoid

In 1983 another partial skeleton of a theropod was found from the Orphan Mesa region where it is possible Baldwin collected the original Coelophysis material, at a site named Cross Quarry after its discoverer Robert Cross. The specimen, NMMNH P-22298 and known informally as the "Orphan Mesa theropod", was an incomplete skeleton of an immature theropod, preserving several vertebrae, the scapulacoracoid, parts of the pelvis and most of the hindlimb. Following the designation of AMNH 7224 as the neotype of Coelophysis bauri, C. longicollis, C. willistoni, and the specimens named C. bauri by Cope lacked a genus and species, so the NMMNH P-22298 as well as material previously assigned to C. willistoni (AMNH 2706) were named Eucoelophysis by Sullivan and Lucas in 1999. When originally named, Sullivan and Lucas placed Eucoelophysis within Ceratosauria as a close relative of Coelophysis, Syntarsus rhodesiensis, and Syntarsus kayentakatae. American paleontologists Andrew Heckert and colleagues in 2000 referred further theropod material to Eucoelophysis (as E. sp.) from the Snyder Quarry elsewhere in the Chinle Formation, suggesting it may belong to a new species, which they reiterated in 2003. These referrals and the identify of Eucoelophysis was reevaluated in 2006 by Argentine paleontologist Martín Ezcurra who identified that many of the features used by Sullivan and Lucas to support the identity of Eucoelophysis were instead shared amongst all early dinosaurs, with Eucoelophysis instead appearing more similar to the non-dinosaur Silesaurus. Neither the Snyder Quarry specimens nor the material originally assigned to C. longicollis were found to share features with Eucoelophysis by Ezcurra, who identified them instead as indeterminate coelophysoids. An articulated skeleton (TMP 1986.63.33) from the Coelophysis quarry previously considered a specimen of Coelophysis was moved to Eucoelophysis by American paleontologist Larry Rinehart and colleagues in 2009, but it was returned to Coelophysis in 2018 by American paleontologist Chris Griffin. The identification of Eucoelophysis as a silesaurid, distant from Coelophysis and the Baldwin material, was upheld by independent work by American paleontologists Sterling Nesbitt, Randall Irmis and William Parker in 2007.

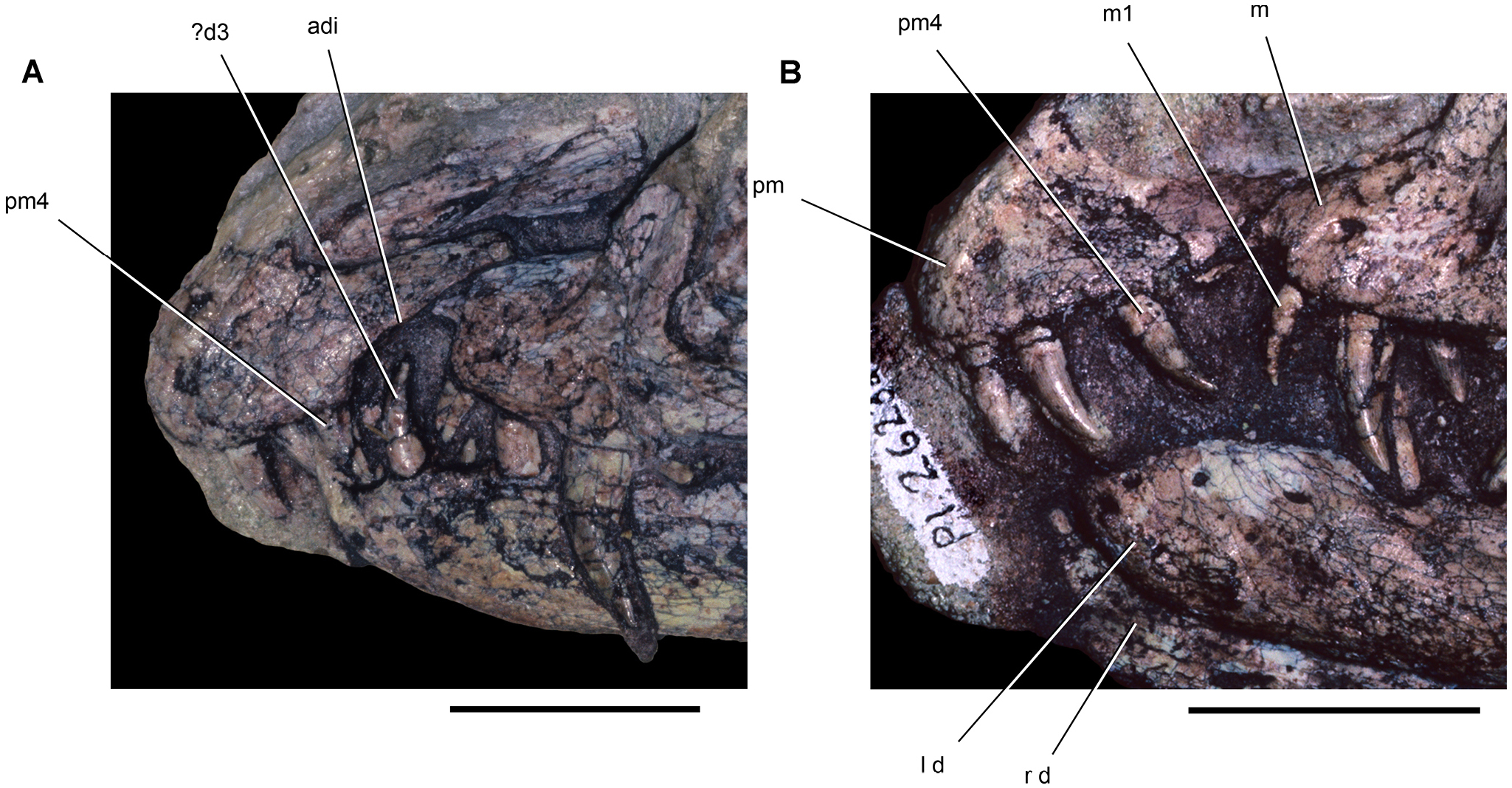
Snout and front teeth of C. bauri and C.? kayentakatae

While the Zimbabwean genus Syntarsus was first described by South African paleontologist Michael A. Raath as a separate genus of podokesaurid, it was compared very favourably to Coelophysis by both Raath and Colbert, with differences in bone fusion and the pelvis separating the two taxa. The similarity between the two genera was extended upon by American paleontologist Gregory S. Paul in 1984, who considered Syntarsus a species of Coelophysis, C. rhodesiensis, as well as finding Halticosaurus to be a probable synonym. Syntarsus and Coelophysis were distinguished by Padian in 1986 despite his referral of many other Triassic theropods lacking unique features to Coelophysis, but Paul maintained the synonymy of the two genera in 1988 and 1993, including assigning Rioarribasaurus colberti to Syntarsus as S. colberti under the belief that Coelophysis was undiagnostic but the Ghost Ranch specimens were not. American paleontologist Timothy B. Rowe kept Syntarsus and Coelophysis separate in his 1989 description of the new species Syntarsus kayentakatae, but in 2000 American paleontologist Alex Downs reiterated the opinion of synonymy between Coelophysis and Syntarsus, crediting the poor description of some features of Coelophysis by Colbert to previous misinterpretations. Downs also found that the theropod Camposaurus could not be distinguished from Coelophysis, and considered it undiagnostic, but it was reidentified as a distinct coelophysid by Ezcurra and American paleontologist Stephen Brusatte in 2011.

Further complications with Syntarsus occurred when it was recognized that the genus name had been preoccupied by a colydiine beetle named in 1869, which prompted American and Polish entomologists Michael Ivie, Adam Ślipiński, and Piotr Węgrzynowicz to provide the new replacement name Megapnosaurus for the theropod in 2001, with M. rhodesiensis becoming its type. Many paleontologists did not like the naming of Megapnosaurus, partially because taxonomists are generally expected to allow original authors of a name to correct any mistakes in their work. Raath was aware of the homonymy between the dinosaur Syntarsus and beetle Syntarsus, but the group who published Megapnosaurus have claimed that they believed Raath was deceased and unable to correct his mistake, so they proceeded accordingly. American paleontologist Mickey Mortimer pointed out that "Paleontologists might have reacted more positively if the replacement name (Megapnosaurus) hadn't been facetious, translating to "big dead lizard". In 2024, it has been petitioned to the ICZN that Syntarsus be retained for the name of the theropod. In the interim, Bristowe and Raath (2004) first proposed the synonymy of both species of Syntarsus with Coelophysis, though they were uncertain whether S. kayentakatae belonged to this genus, referring it to as ?C. kayentatakatae. Multiple authors in the 2000s provisionally considered S. rhodesiensis to be a species of Coelophysis, while S. kayentakatae has been identified as belonging to a separate genus and in need of a new name. Phylogenetic analyses of Coelophysidae have found that S. rhodesiensis is not the sister taxon to Coelophysis, so the name Megapnosaurus has been used in those cases.

== Description ==
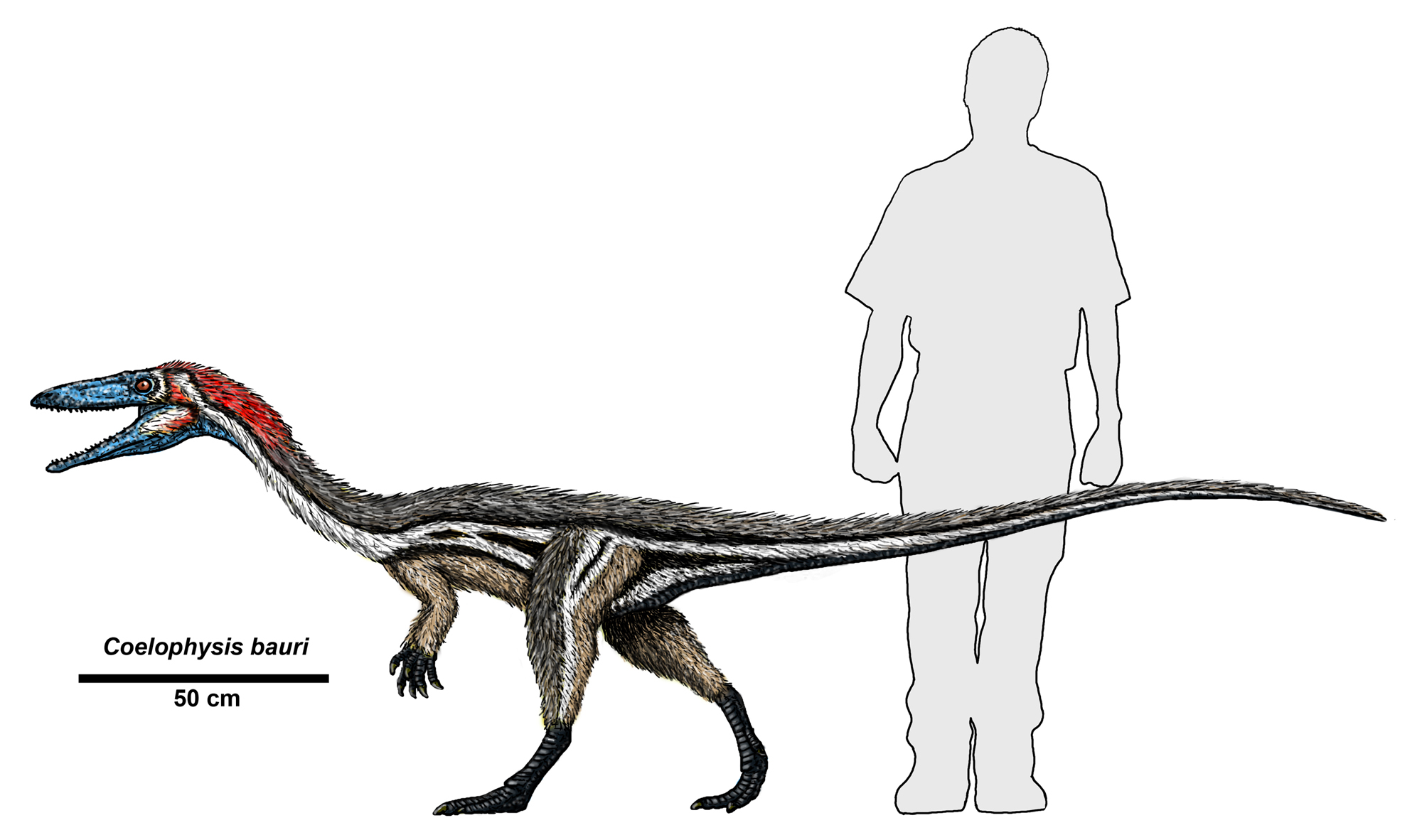
Size of C. bauri compared to a human

Coelophysis is known from a number of complete fossil skeletons of the species C. bauri. This lightly built dinosaur measured up to 3 metres (9.8 ft) long and was more than a meter tall at the hips. Gregory S. Paul (1988) estimated the weight of the gracile form at 15 kg (33 lb) and the weight of the robust form at 20 kg (44 lb), but later presented a higher estimate of 25 kg (55 lb). Coelophysis was a bipedal, carnivorous, theropod dinosaur and a fast, agile runner. Despite its basal position within Theropoda, the bauplan of Coelophysis differed from those of other basal theropods, such as Herrerasaurus, showing more derived traits common in theropods that superseded it. The torso of Coelophysis conforms to the basic theropod bauplan, but the pectoral girdle displays some special characteristics. C. bauri had a furcula (wishbone), the earliest known example in a dinosaur. Coelophysis also preserves the ancestral condition of possessing four digits on the hand (manus). It had only three functional digits, with the fourth being embedded in the flesh of the hand.

Coelophysis had narrow hips, arms adapted for grasping prey, and narrow feet. Its neck and tail were long and slender. The pelvis and hindlimbs of C. bauri are also slight variations on the theropod body plan. It has the open acetabulum and straight ankle hinge that define Dinosauria. The leg ended in a three-toed foot (pes) with a raised dewclaw (hallux). The tail had an unusual structure within its interlocking prezygapophysis of its vertebrae, which formed a semi-rigid lattice, apparently to stop the tail from moving up and down.

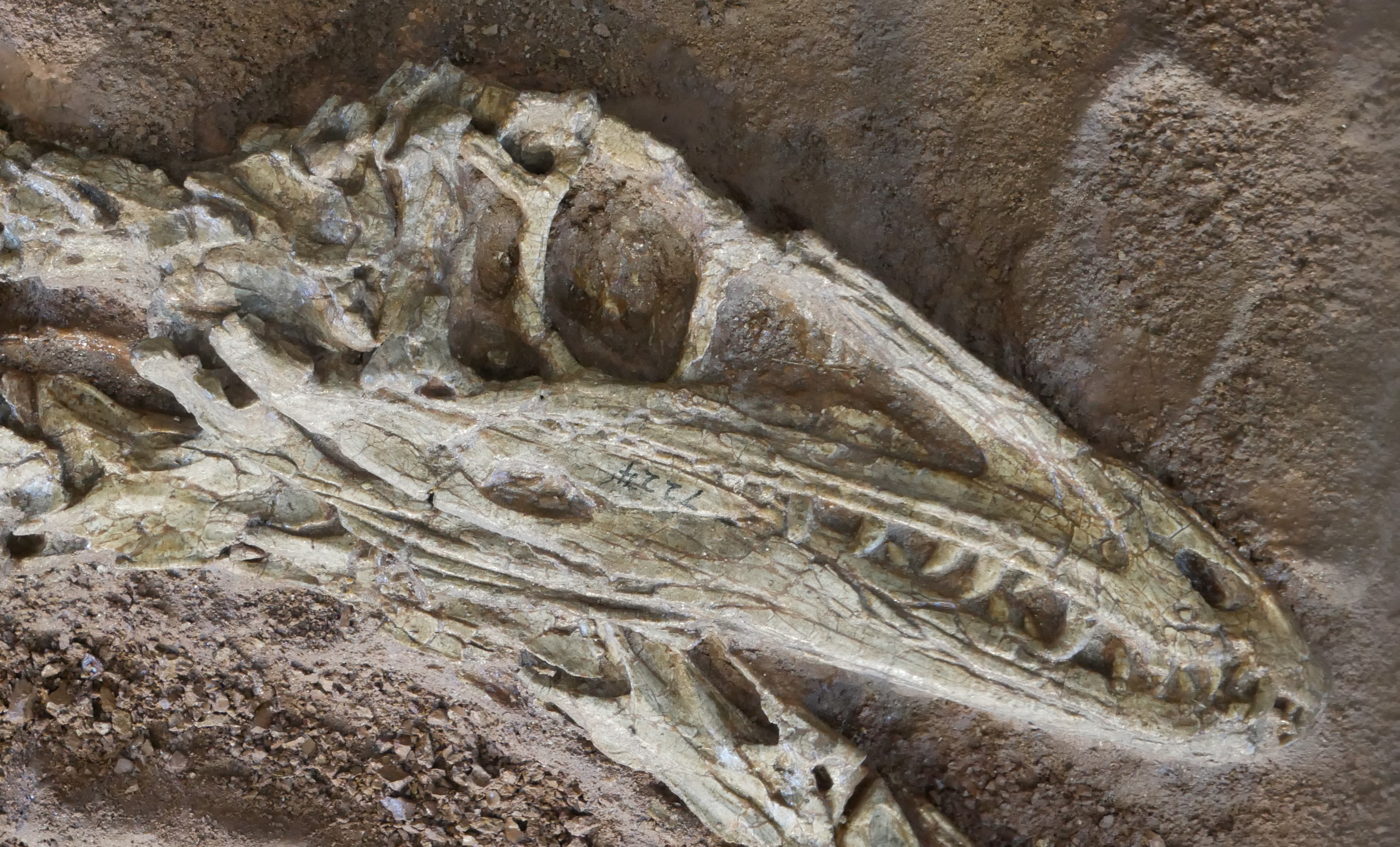
Skull of the C. bauri neotype

Coelophysis had a long and narrow head (approximately 270 mm (0.9 ft)), with large, forward-facing eyes that afforded it stereoscopic vision and, as a result, excellent depth perception. Rinehart et al. (2004) described the complete scleral ring found for a juvenile Coelophysis bauri (specimen NMMNH P-4200) and compared it to data on the scleral rings of reptiles (including birds), concluding that Coelophysis was a diurnal, visually oriented predator. The study found that the vision of Coelophysis was superior to most lizards' vision and ranked with that of modern birds of prey. The eyes of Coelophysis appear to be the closest to those of eagles and hawks, with a high power of accommodation. The data also suggested poor night vision, which would mean this dinosaur had a round pupil rather than a split pupil.

Coelophysis had an elongated snout with large fenestrae that helped to reduce skull weight, while narrow struts of bones preserved the structural integrity of the skull. The neck had a pronounced sigmoid curve. The braincase is known in Coelophysis bauri, but little data could be derived because the skull was crushed. Unlike some other theropods, the cranial ornamentation of Coelophysis was not located at the top of its skull. Low, laterally raised bony ridges were present on the dorsolateral margin of the nasal and lacrimal bones in the skull, directly above the antorbital fenestra.

=== Distinguishing anatomical features ===
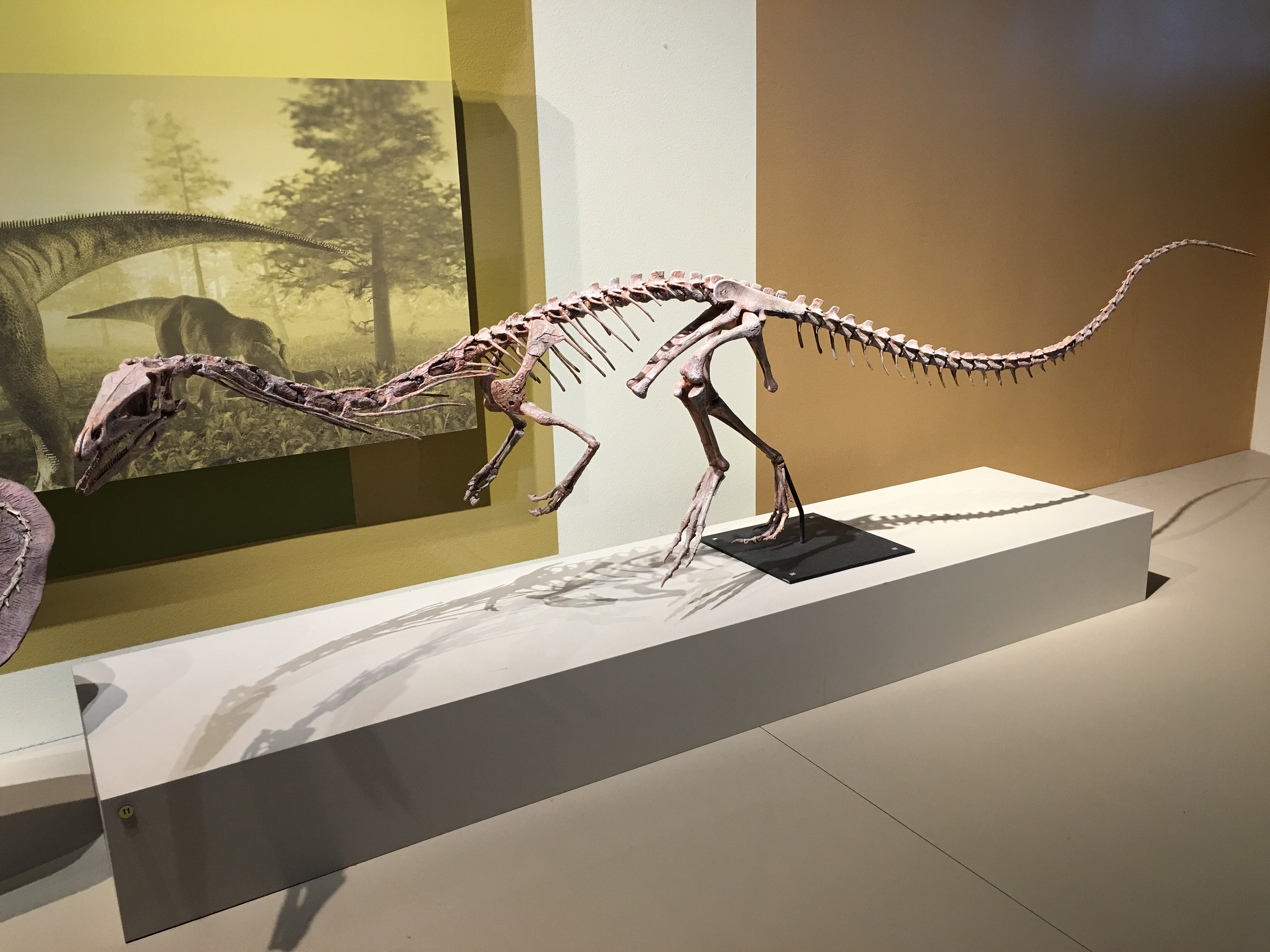
Reconstructed skeleton

A diagnosis is a statement of the anatomical features of an organism (or group) that collectively distinguish it from all other organisms. Some, but not all, of the features in a diagnosis are also autapomorphies. An autapomorphy is a distinctive anatomical feature that is unique to a given organism or group.

According to Ezcurra (2007) and Bristowe and Raath (2004), Coelophysis can be distinguished based on the absence of an offset rostral process of the maxilla, the quadrate being strongly caudally, a small external mandibular fenestra (which is 9–10% of the mandibular length), and the anteroposterior length of the ventral lacrimal process is greater than 30% of its height.

Several paleontologists consider Coelophysis bauri to be the same dinosaur as Megapnosaurus rhodesiensis (formerly Syntarsus). However, this has been refuted by many paleontologists. Downs (2000) concluded that C. bauri differs from C. rhodesiensis in cervical length, proximal and distal leg proportions, and proximal caudal vertebral anatomy. Tykoski and Rowe (2004) concluded that C. bauri differs from M. rhodesiensis in that it lacks a pit at the base of the nasal process of the premaxilla. Bristowe and Raath (2004) concluded that C. bauri differs from M. rhodesiensis in having a longer maxillary tooth row. Barta et al. (2018) concluded that C. bauri differed from M. rhodesiensis in that it bears its 5th metacarpal. Griffin (2018) concluded that C. bauri differs from M. rhodesiensis in several differences in the musculature of the limbs.

== Classification ==
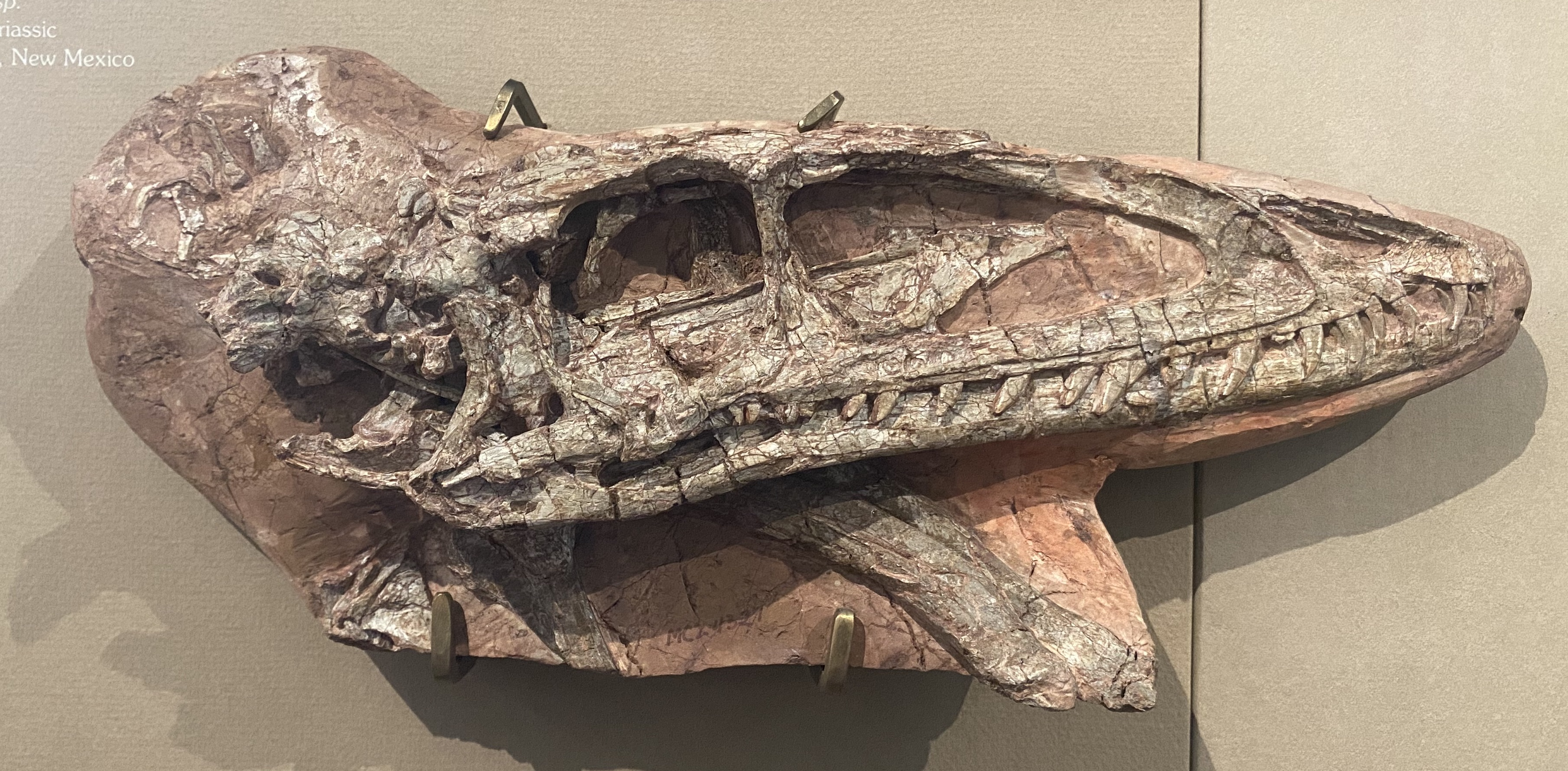
Skull of Coelophysis specimen MCZ 4327 from Ghost Ranch

When first described, Cope believed that Coelophysis was a member of the carnivorous dinosaur group Goniopoda, as a relative of Anchisaurus, Coelurus and at times Tanystropheus. Huene, in his 1906 reevaluation of Triassic dinosaurs, found that Coelophysis differed significantly from the families Plateosauridae and Thecodontosauridae (which included Anchisaurus), and that Tanystropheus was an intermediate early reptile and not a dinosaur. Huene believed that Coelophysis represented the earliest, and first Triassic, member of the theropod family Coeluridae, as a relative of the Jurassic taxa Coelurus, Compsognathus, and Ornitholestes and also later Cretaceous members. Huene maintained a similar classification later in 1914 and then 1915, but had changed his opinion on the status of Dinosauria following the suggestion of British paleontologist Harry Govier Seeley that was not a natural group, with Saurischia and Ornithischia replacing it. From this, Huene created the new subgroups of Saurischia, Pachypodosauria for large carnivores and sauropods, and Coelurosauria for slender carnivores. Triassic coelurosaurs were separated into two families, the Hallopoda and the Podokesauridae, the latter of which included the Triassic genera Coelophysis, Halticosaurus, Podokesaurus, Procompsognathus, Saltopus and Tanystropheus. From podokesaurids, Podokesaurus was believed to give rise to the Jurassic and Cretaceous Compsognathidae while Coelophysis was believed to give rise to Jurassic-only Coeluridae.

The placement of Coelophysis as a coelurosaur continued to be followed by Huene and Hungarian paleontologist Franz Nopcsa, though its classification amongst coelurosaurs was variable. In 1921 Huene moved Coelophysis into the Coeluridae from the Podokesauridae alongside Halticosaurus, while he would retain it within Podokesauridae later in 1932 and 1956. Other podokesaurids were also reclassified during this time into the families Procompsognathidae or Halticosauridae of Huene, or the subfamilies Coelophysinae and Podokesaurinae named by Nopcsa, with Coelophysis by 1956 only considered a close relative of Podokesaurus, Saltopus, Lukousaurus and Spinosuchus. A taxonomic scheme based on the work of Huene was followed by American paleontologists including Alfred Sherwood Romer and Colbert with modifications. Romer found in 1956 that Podokesauridae included Coelophysis and almost all Triassic coelurosaurs, and Colbert in 1964 believed that Coelophysis was the best-known podokesaurid, both differing from Huene by treating Coelurosauria as an early branch of Theropoda and not recognizing Pachypodosauria.

The family Coelophysidae was first recognized by American paleontologist Samuel P. Welles in 1984 who described Dilophosaurus and reviewed early theropods. Welles advocated for abandoning Coelurosauria as a paraphyletic group that gave rise to later theropods, and instead recognized many families of Triassic and Jurassic theropods of uncertain interrelationships. Coelophysis bauri was placed along with Sarcosaurus as coelophysids, while C. longicollis (as Longosaurus) was placed as a halticosaurid alongside Dilophosaurus, Halticosaurus and Liliensternus. The family Procompsognathidae was also recognized to include Triassic genera, while Podokesaurus was unable to be classified due to its incompleteness and Podokesauridae was abandoned. Colbert did not follow this during his 1989 description of the Ghost Ranch specimens, recognising Coelophysis, Halticosaurus, Podokesaurus, Procompsognathus and Syntarsus as podokesaurids, but American paleontologist Thomas R. Holtz Jr. in 1994 followed Welles, using Coelophysidae for Coelophysis and its relatives, considering Podokesaurus indeterminate, and naming the new clade Coelophysoidea to unite coelophysids with Dilophosaurus.

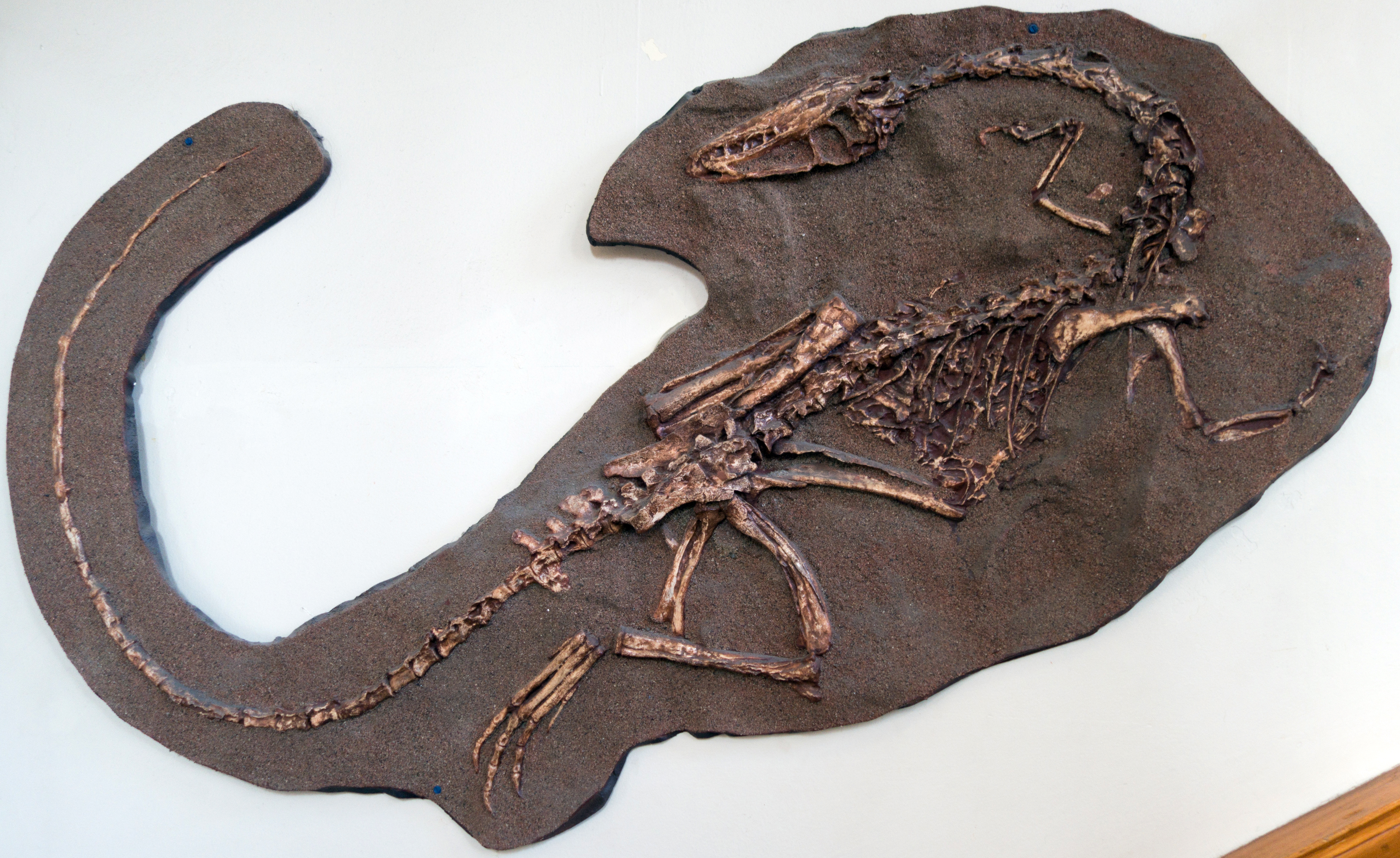
Cast of the neotype specimen AMNH FR 7224, Redpath Museum

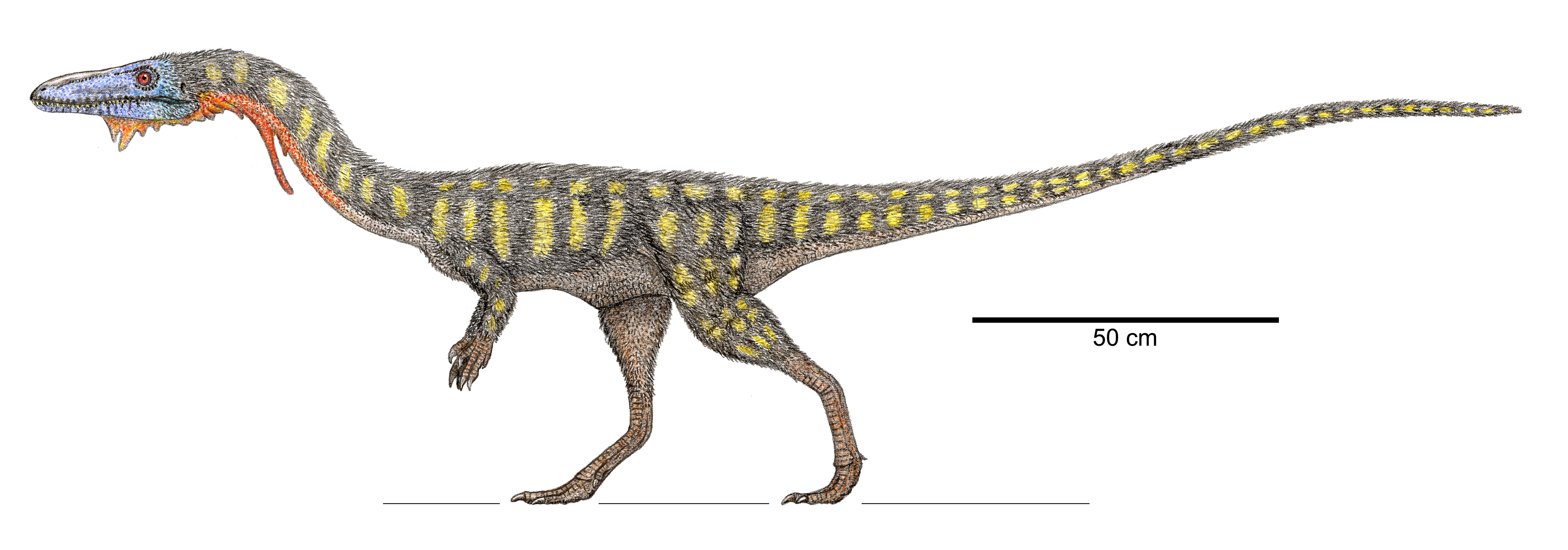
Restoration of Coelophysis showing hypothetical wattle and feathers

- - Theropoda
    - Tawa hallae
    - Chindesaurus
  - - Eodromaeus
    - - Neotheropoda
        - Coelophysoidea
          - Liliensternus
          - Dracoraptor
          - - "Syntarsus" kayentakatae
            - - Panguraptor
              - - Powellvenator
                - - Procompsognathus
                  - - - Coelophysis
                      - Lepidus
                    - - Camposaurus
                      - Lucianovenator
                      - Megapnosaurus
                      - Segisaurus
        - - Zupaysaurus
          - - Gojirasaurus
            - - Cryolophosaurus
              - - Dilophosaurus
                - - Sarcosaurus
                  - - Tachiraptor
                    - Averostra

Theropod cladogram based on the phylogenetic analyses conducted by Ezcurra et al. (2020).

Coelophysis is a distinct taxonomic unit (genus), composed of the single species C. bauri. Two additional originally described species, C. longicollis and C. willistoni, are now considered dubious and undiagnostic. M. rhodesiensis was referred to Coelophysis for several years, but it is likely its own genus and is known from the early Jurassic of southern Africa. A third possible species is Coelophysis kayentakatae, previously referred to the genus Megapnosaurus, from the Kayenta Formation of the southwestern US. In recent phylogenetic analyses, "Syntarsus" kayentakatae has been shown to be distantly related to Coelophysis and Megapnosaurus, suggesting that it belongs to its own genus.

== Paleobiology ==
=== Feeding ===
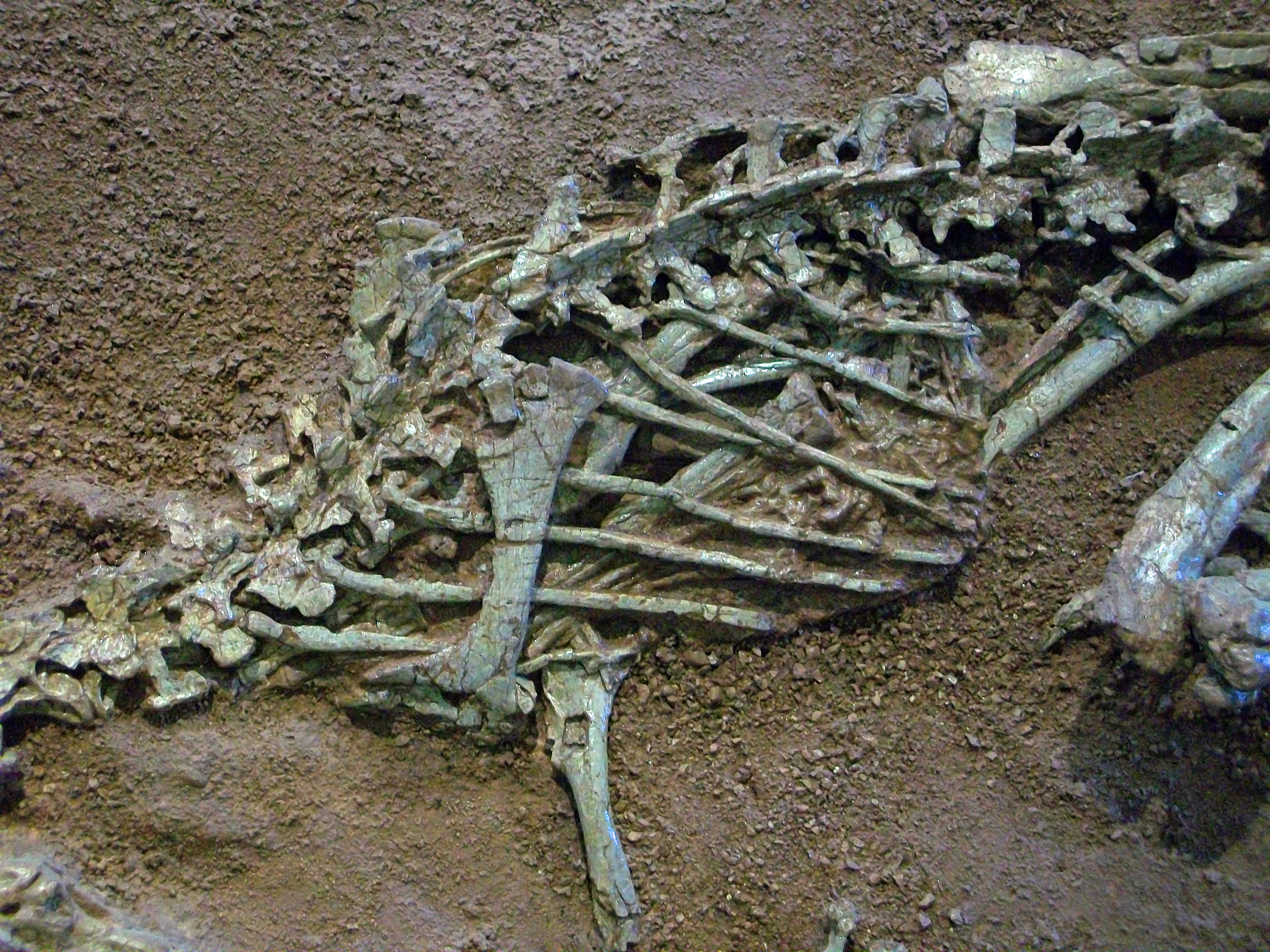
Bones in a skeleton of C. bauri at the American Museum of Natural History, now interpreted as those of a crocodylomorph

The teeth of Coelophysis were typical of predatory dinosaurs, as they were blade-like, recurved, sharp, jagged, and finely serrated on both the anterior and posterior edges. Its dentition shows that it was carnivorous, probably preying on the small, lizard-like animals that were discovered with it. It may also have hunted in packs to tackle larger prey. Coelophysis bauri has approximately 26 teeth on the maxillary bone of the upper jaw and 27 teeth on the dentary bone of the lower jaw. Kenneth Carpenter (2002) examined the bio-mechanics of theropod arms and attempted to evaluate their usefulness in predation. He concluded that the arm of Coelophysis was flexible and had a good range of motion, but its bone structure suggested that it was comparatively weak. The "weak" arms and small teeth in this genus suggested that Coelophysis preyed upon animals that were substantially smaller than itself. Rinehart et al. agreed that Coelophysis was a "hunter of small, fast-moving prey". Carpenter also identified three distinct models of theropod arm use and noted that Coelophysis was a "combination grasper-clutcher", as compared to other dinosaurs that were "clutchers" or "long armed graspers".

It has been suggested that C. bauri was a cannibal, based on supposed juvenile specimens found "within" the abdominal cavities of some Ghost Ranch specimens. However, Robert J. Gay showed in 2002 that these specimens were misinterpreted. Several specimens of "juvenile coelophysids" were actually small crurotarsan reptiles, such as Hesperosuchus. Gay's position was lent support in a 2006 study by Nesbitt et al. In 2009, new evidence of cannibalism came to light when additional preparation of previously excavated matrix revealed regurgitate material in and around the mouth of Coelophysis specimen NMMNH P-44551. This material included tooth and jaw bone fragments that Rinehart et al. considered "morphologically identical" to a juvenile Coelophysis.

In 2010, Gay examined the bones of juveniles found within the thoracic cavity of AMNH 7224 and calculated that the total volume of these bones was 17 times greater than the maximum estimated stomach volume of the Coelophysis specimen. Gay observed that the total volume would be even greater when considering that there would have been flesh on these bones. This analysis also noted the absence of tooth marks on the bones as would be expected in defleshing and the absence of expected pitting by stomach acids. Finally, Gay demonstrated that the alleged cannibalized juvenile bones were deposited stratigraphically below the larger animal that had supposedly cannibalized them. Taken together, these data suggested that the Coelophysis specimen AMNH 7224 was not a cannibal and that the bones of the juvenile and adult specimens were found in their final position as a result of "coincidental superposition of different sized individuals.

=== Social behavior ===
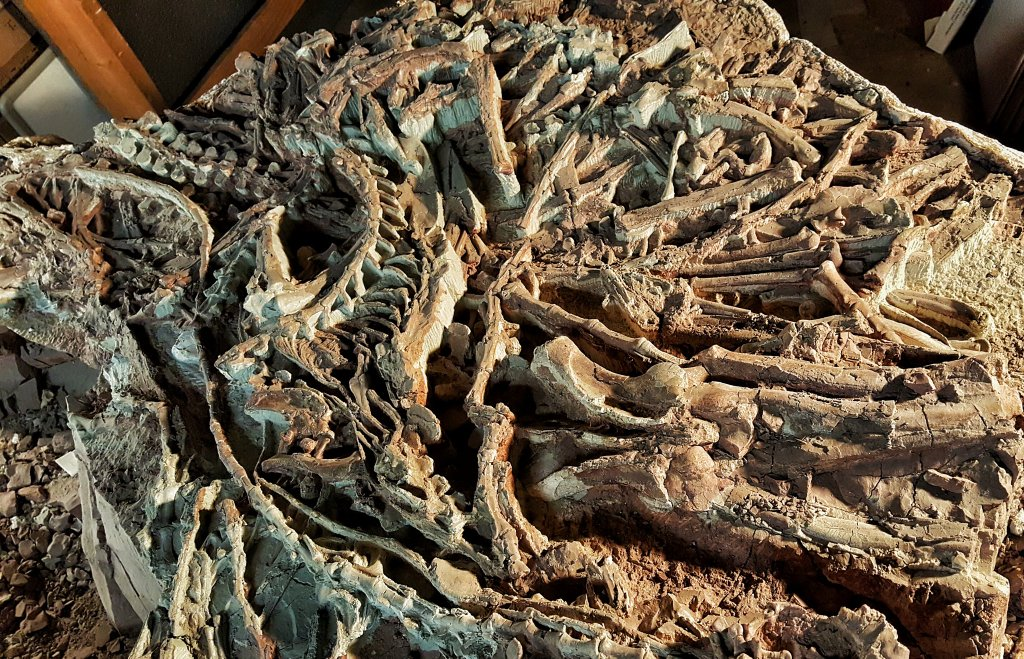
The Cleveland Museum of Natural History's Coelophysis block, originally American Museum of Natural History block XII collected by Colbert in 1948

The discovery of over 1,000 specimens of Coelophysis at the Whitaker quarry at Ghost Ranch has suggested gregarious behavior to researchers like Schwartz and Gillette. There is a tendency to see this massive congregation of animals as evidence for huge packs of Coelophysis roaming the land. No direct evidence for flocking exists because the deposits only indicate that large numbers of Coelophysis, along with various other Triassic animals, were buried together. Some of the evidence from the taphonomy of the site indicates that these animals may have been gathered together to feed or drink from a depleted water hole or to feed on a spawning run of fish, being later buried in a catastrophic flash flood or a drought.

With 30 specimens of C. rhodesiensis found together in Zimbabwe, some palaeontologists have suggested that Coelophysis was indeed gregarious. Again, there is no direct evidence of flocking in this case and it has also been suggested that these individuals were also victims of flash flooding as it appears to have been commonplace during this period.

=== Life history ===
==== Growth and sexual dimorphism ====
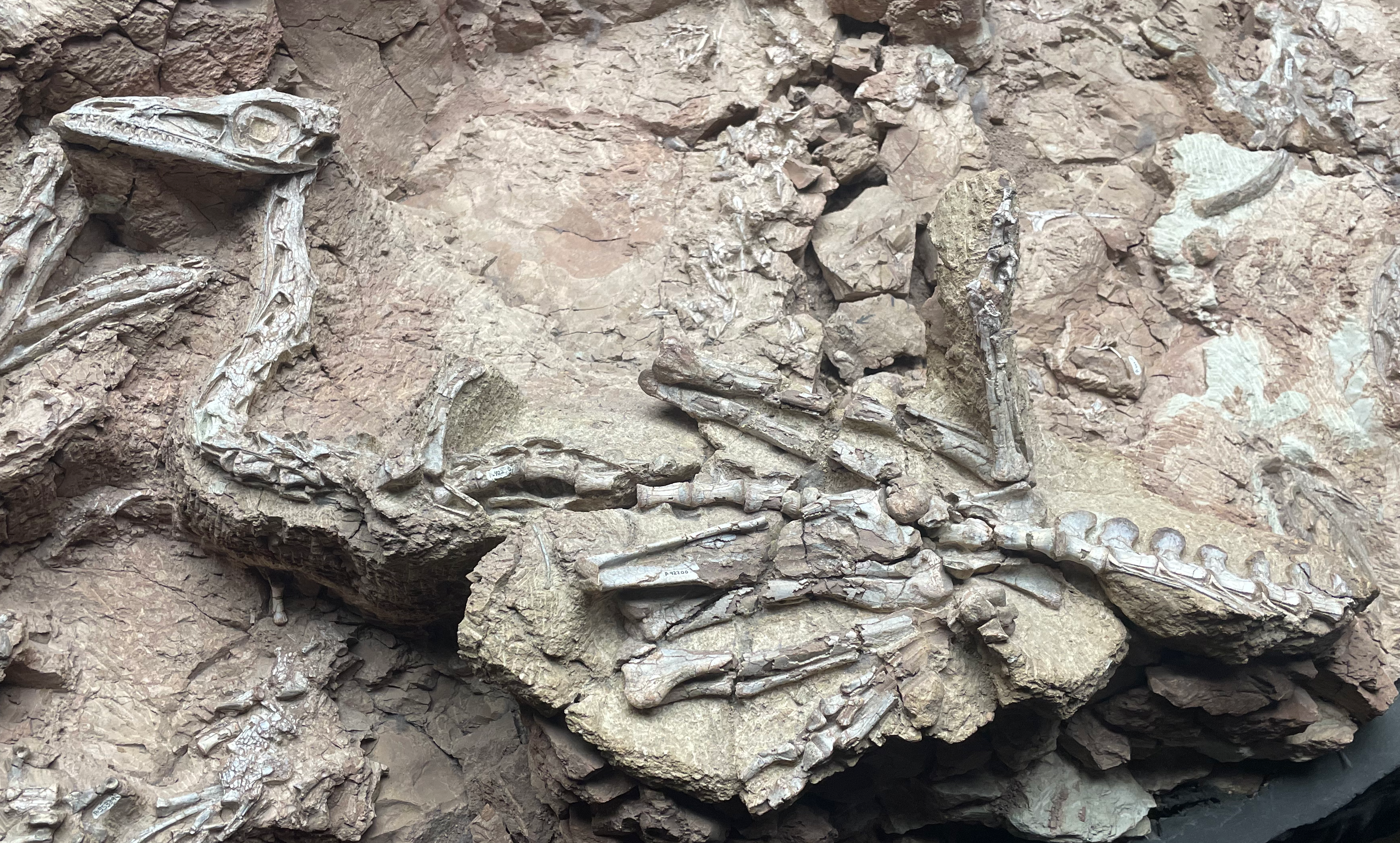
Juvenile skeleton of C. bauri at the New Mexico Museum of Natural History and Science

Rinehart (2009) assessed the ontogenic growth of this genus using data gathered from the length of its upper leg bone (femur) and concluded that Coelophysis juveniles grew rapidly, especially during the first year of life. Coelophysis likely reached sexual maturity between the second and third year of life and reached its full size, just above 10 feet in length, by its eighth year. This study identified four distinct growth stages: 1-year, 2-year, 4-year, and 7+ year. It was also thought that, as soon as they were hatched, they would have to fend for themselves.

Two "morphs" of Coelophysis have been identified. One is a more gracile form, as in specimen AMNH 7223, and the other is a slightly more robust form, as in specimens AMNH 7224 and NMMNH P-42200. Skeletal proportions were different between these two forms. The gracile form has a longer skull, a longer neck, shorter arms, and has sacral neural spines that are fused. The robust form has a shorter skull, a shorter neck, longer arms, and unfused sacral neural spines. Historically, many arguments have been made that this represents some sort of dimorphism in the population of Coelophysis, probably sexual dimorphism. Raath agreed that dimorphism in Coelophysis is evidenced by the size and structure of the arm. Rinehart et al. studied 15 individuals, and agreed that two morphs were present, even in juvenile specimens, and suggested that sexual dimorphism was present early in life, prior to sexual maturity. Rinehart concluded that the gracile form was female and the robust form was male based on differences in the sacral vertebrae of the gracile form, which allowed for greater flexibility for egg laying. Further support for this position was provided by an analysis showing that each morph comprised 50% of the population, as would be expected in a Fisherian sex ratio.

However, more recent research based on analysis of growth series has found that C. bauri and C. rhodesiensis had highly variable growth between individuals, with some specimens being larger in their immature phase than smaller adults were when completely mature. Osteohistological analysis of C. bauri likewise reveals an extremely variable life history pattern for the species. This indicates that the supposed presence of distinct morphs is simply the result of individual variation that is not related to sex differences. This highly variable growth was likely ancestral to dinosaurs but later lost and may have given such early dinosaurs an evolutionary advantage in surviving harsh environmental challenges.

==== Reproduction ====
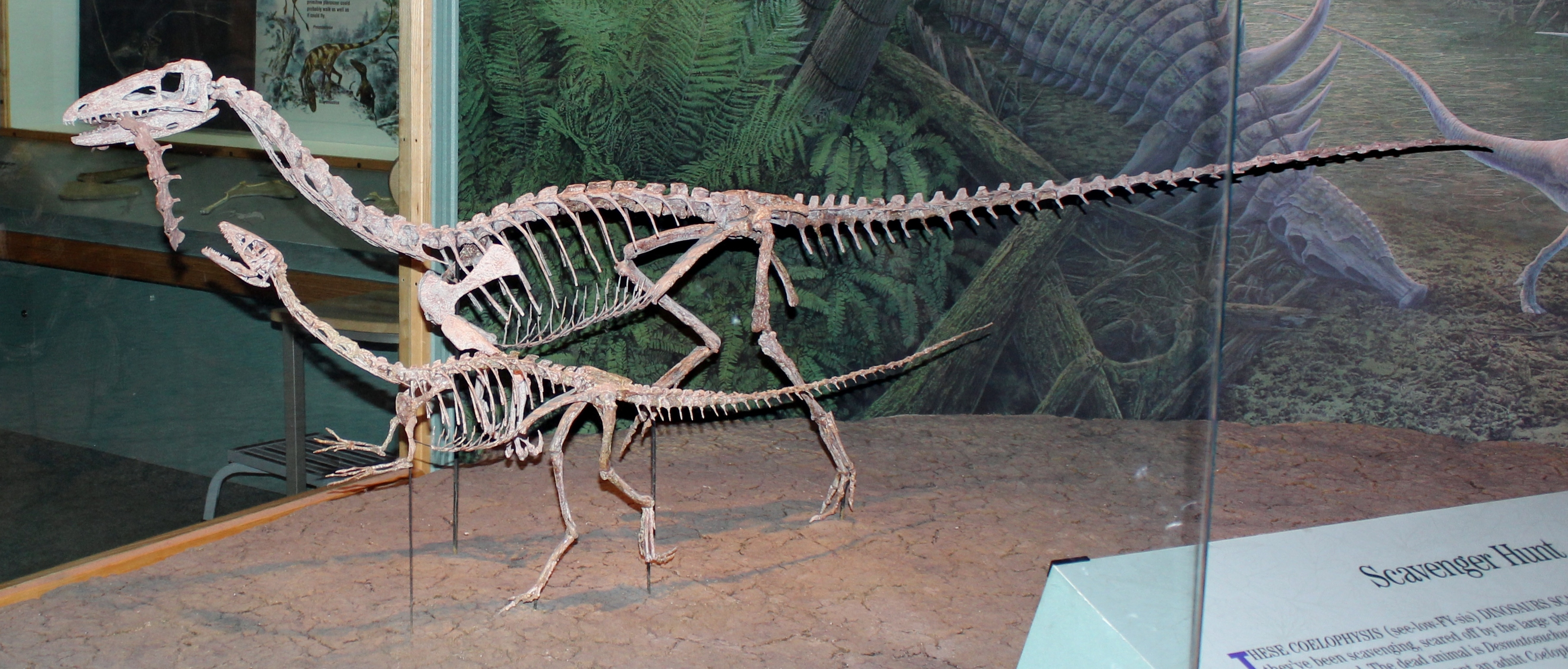
Two C. bauri casts mounted at the Denver Museum of Nature and Science

Through the compilation and analysis of a database of nearly three dozen reptiles (including birds) and comparison with existing data about the anatomy of Coelophysis, Rinehart et al. (2009) drew the following conclusions. It was estimated that average egg of Coelophysis was 31–33.5 millimeters across its minor diameter and that each female would lay between 24 and 26 eggs in each clutch. The evidence suggested that some parental care was necessary to nurture the relatively small hatchlings during the first year of life, where they would reach 1.5 meters in length by the end of their first growth stage. Coelophysis bauri invested as much energy in reproduction as other extinct reptiles of its approximate size.

=== Paleopathology ===
In a 2001 study conducted by Bruce Rothschild and other paleontologists, 14-foot bones referred to Coelophysis were examined for signs of stress fracture, but none were found.

In C. rhodesiensis, healed fractures of the tibia and metatarsus have been observed, but are very rare. "[T]he supporting butresses of the second sacral rib" in one specimen of Syntarsus rhodesiensis showed signs of fluctuating asymmetry. Fluctuating asymmetry results from developmental disturbances and is more common in populations under stress and can therefore be informative about the quality of conditions a dinosaur lived under.

== Ichnology ==
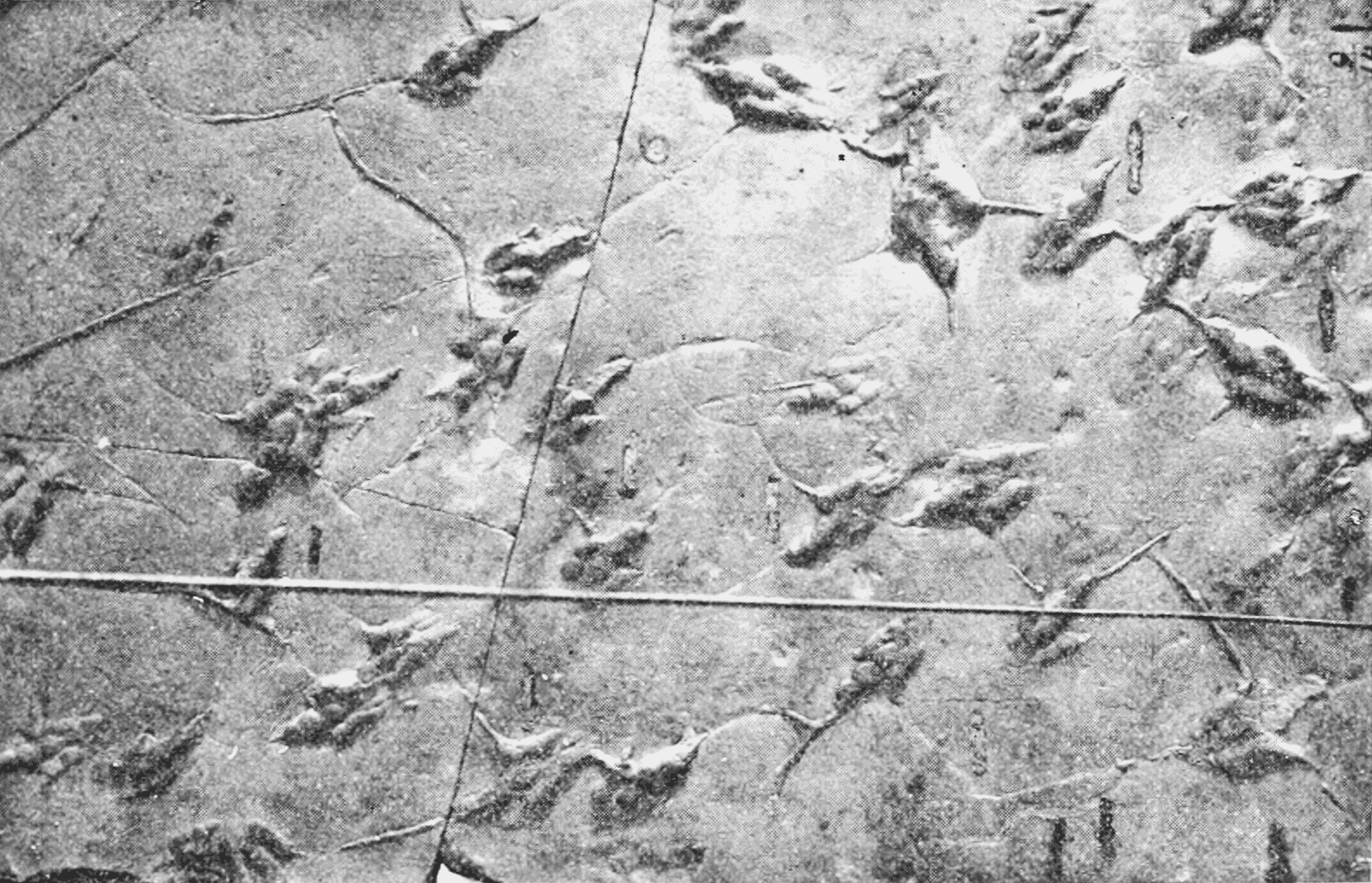
Grallator from Middletown, Connecticut

Edwin H. Colbert has suggested that the theropod footprints referred to the ichnogenus Grallator, located in the Connecticut River Valley across Connecticut and Massachusetts, may have been made by Coelophysis. The footprints are from the Late Triassic to Early Jurassic aged Newark Supergroup. They clearly show digits II, III, and IV, but not I or V. That condition is strange for footprints of their age. The digits I and V were presumed to be stubby and ineffective, not touching the ground when the dinosaur was walking or running. They have been thought to be from an unidentified, primitive saurischian similar to Coelophysis by David B. Weishampel and L. Young more recently. Skeletal remains resembling Coelophysis have also been found in the valley, supporting the idea that a species similar to Coelophysis is responsible for the footprints.

== Paleoenvironment ==
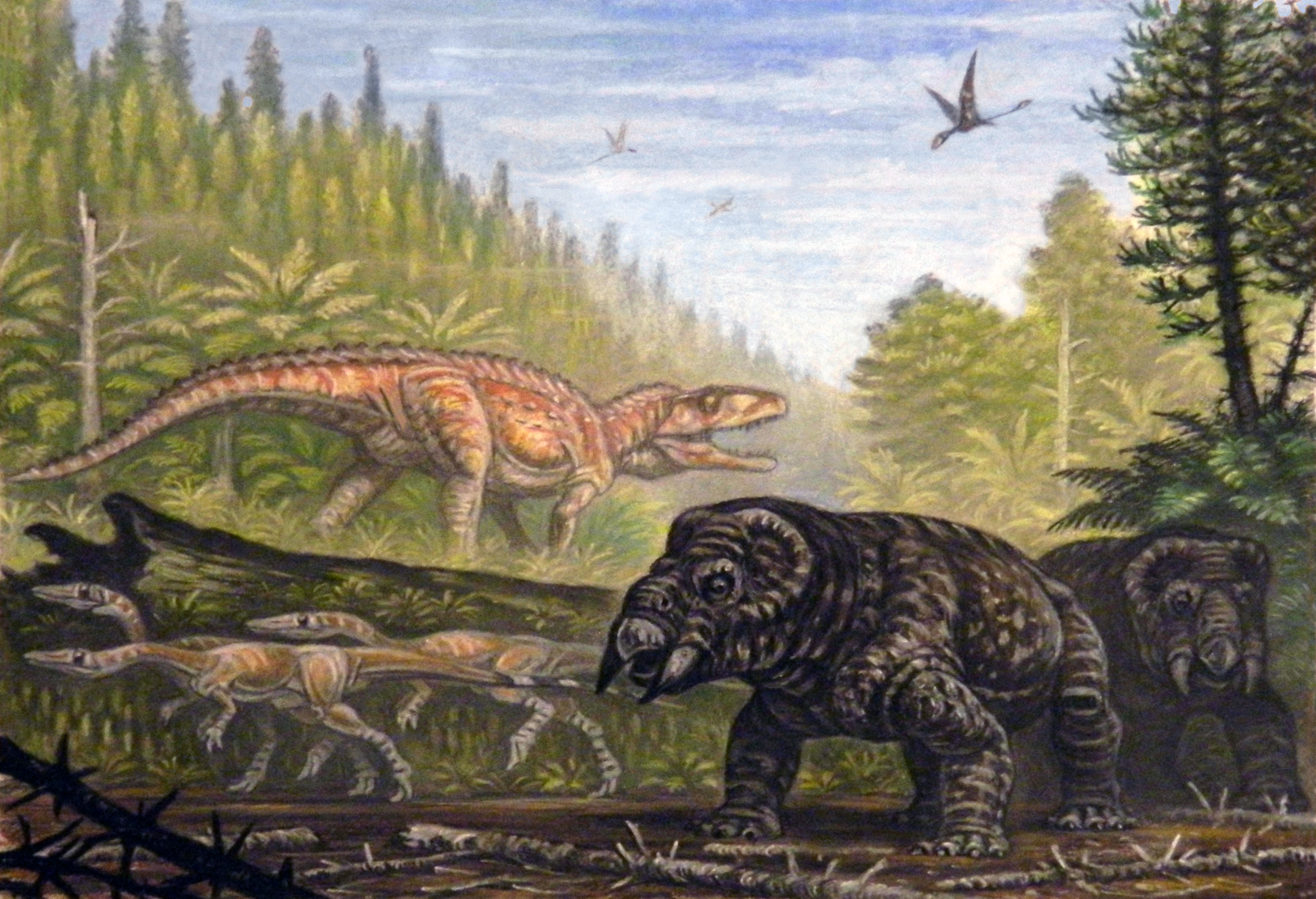
Restoration of Coelophysis and contemporary animals

Specimens of Coelophysis have been recovered from the Chinle Formation of New Mexico and Arizona, more famously at the Ghost Ranch (Whitaker) quarry in the Rock Point member among other quarries in the underlying Petrified Forest member, the sediments of which have been dated to approximately 212 million years ago, making them part of the middle Norian stage of the Late Triassic, but Thomas Holtz Jr. interpreted that it was during the Rhaetian stage from approximately 204 to 201.6 million years ago.

C. rhodesiensis has been recovered in the Upper Elliot Formation in the Cape and Free State provinces of South Africa, as well as the Chitake River bonebed quarry at the Forest Sandstone Formation in Zimbabwe.

Ghost Ranch was located close to the equator over 200 million years ago, and had a warm, monsoon-like climate with heavy seasonal precipitation. Hayden Quarry, a new excavation site at Ghost Ranch, New Mexico, has yielded a diverse collection of fossil material that included the first evidence of dinosaurs and less-advanced dinosauromorphs from the same time period. The discovery indicates that the two groups lived together during the early Triassic period 235 million years ago.

Therrien and Fastovsky (2001) examined the paleoenvironment of Coelophysis and other early theropods from Petrified Forest National Park in Arizona and determined that this genus lived in an environment that consisted of floodplains marked by distinct dry and wet seasons. There was a great deal of competition during drier times when animals struggled for water in riverbeds that were drying up.

In the upper sections of the Chinle Formation where Coelophysis is found, dinosaurs were rare. So far, only Chindesaurus and Daemonosaurus are known, the terrestrial fauna being dominated instead by other reptiles like the rhynchocephalian Whitakersaurus, the pseudosuchian Revueltosaurus, the aetosaurs Desmatosuchus, Typothorax and Heliocanthus, the crocodilomorph Hesperosuchus, the "rauisuchians" Shuvosaurus, Effigia, and Vivaron, along with other rare components like the dinosauriform Eucoelophysis and the amniote Kraterokheirodon. In the waterways there are the phytosaur Machaeroprosopus, the archosauromorph Vancleavea, the amphibians Apachesaurus and Koskinonodon, and the fishes Arganodus, Lasalichthyes, and Reticulodus.

=== Taphonomy ===
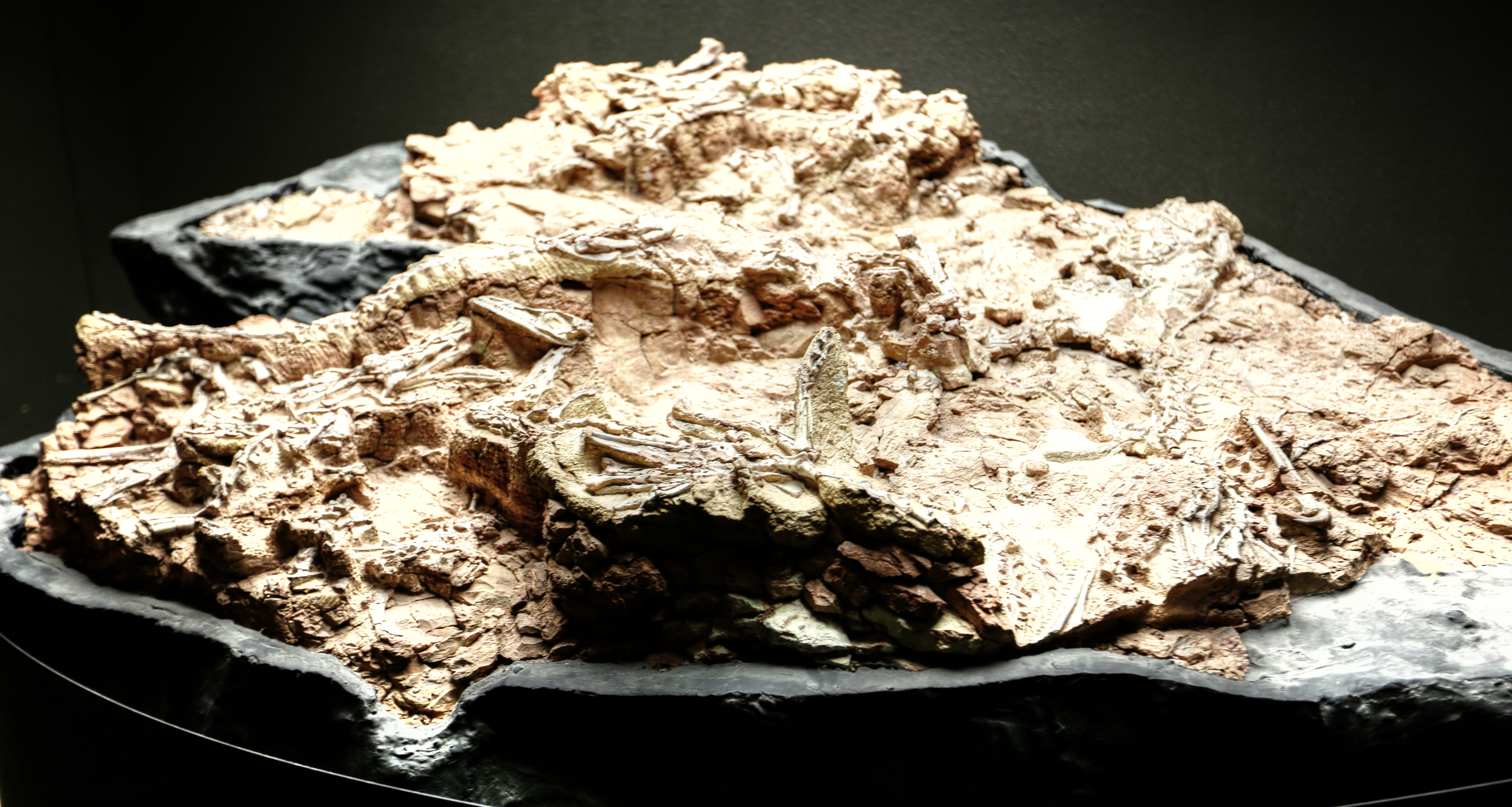
Specimen block, New Mexico Museum

The multitude of specimens deposited so closely together at Ghost Ranch was probably the result of a flash flood that swept away a large number of Coelophysis and buried them quickly and simultaneously. In fact, it seems that such flooding was commonplace during this period of the Earth's history and, indeed, the Petrified Forest of nearby Arizona is the result of a preserved log jam of tree trunks that were caught in one such flood. Whitaker quarry at Ghost Ranch is considered a monotaxic site because it features multiple individuals of a single taxon. The quality of preservation and the ontogenic (age) range of the specimens helped make Coelophysis one of the best known of all genera. In 2009, Rinehart et al. noted that in one case the Coelophysis specimens were "washed into a topographic low containing a small pond, where they probably drowned and were buried by a sheet flood event from a nearby river."

The 30 specimens of C. rhodesiensis found together in Zimbabwe was also probably the result of a flash flood that swept away a large number of Coelophysis and buried them quickly and simultaneously as well.

== Cultural significance ==
Coelophysis was the second dinosaur in space, following Maiasaura (STS-51-F). A Coelophysis skull from the Carnegie Museum of Natural History was aboard the Space Shuttle Endeavour mission STS-89 when it left the atmosphere on 22 January 1998. It was also taken onto the space station Mir before being returned to Earth.

Since the discovery of Coelophysis fossils more than 100 years ago, it is one of the best-known dinosaurs in literature. It was designated as the official state fossil of New Mexico in 1981 and is now the logo of the New Mexico Museum of Natural History.
