= Paris biota =

Rock assemblage in Paris Canyon, Idaho, U.S.

- Stratigraphic range: earliest Spathian, ~249 Ma
- Type: Geological formation

Lithology
- Primary: Shale, limestone, siltstone

Location
- Region: Idaho and Nevada, United States
- Country: USA
- Paris biota (the United States) Paris biota (Idaho)

The Paris biota is an exceptionally diverse Early Triassic (approximately 249 million years ago) fossil assemblage described in 2017 from the Lower Shale Member of the Thaynes Group. It was first discovered in Paris Canyon, west of the town of Paris in Bear Lake County, southeastern Idaho, United States. This biota was later also found in coeval and slightly younger beds in northeastern Nevada (Elko County) and Bear Lake and Caribou counties, southeastern Idaho.

== Age ==
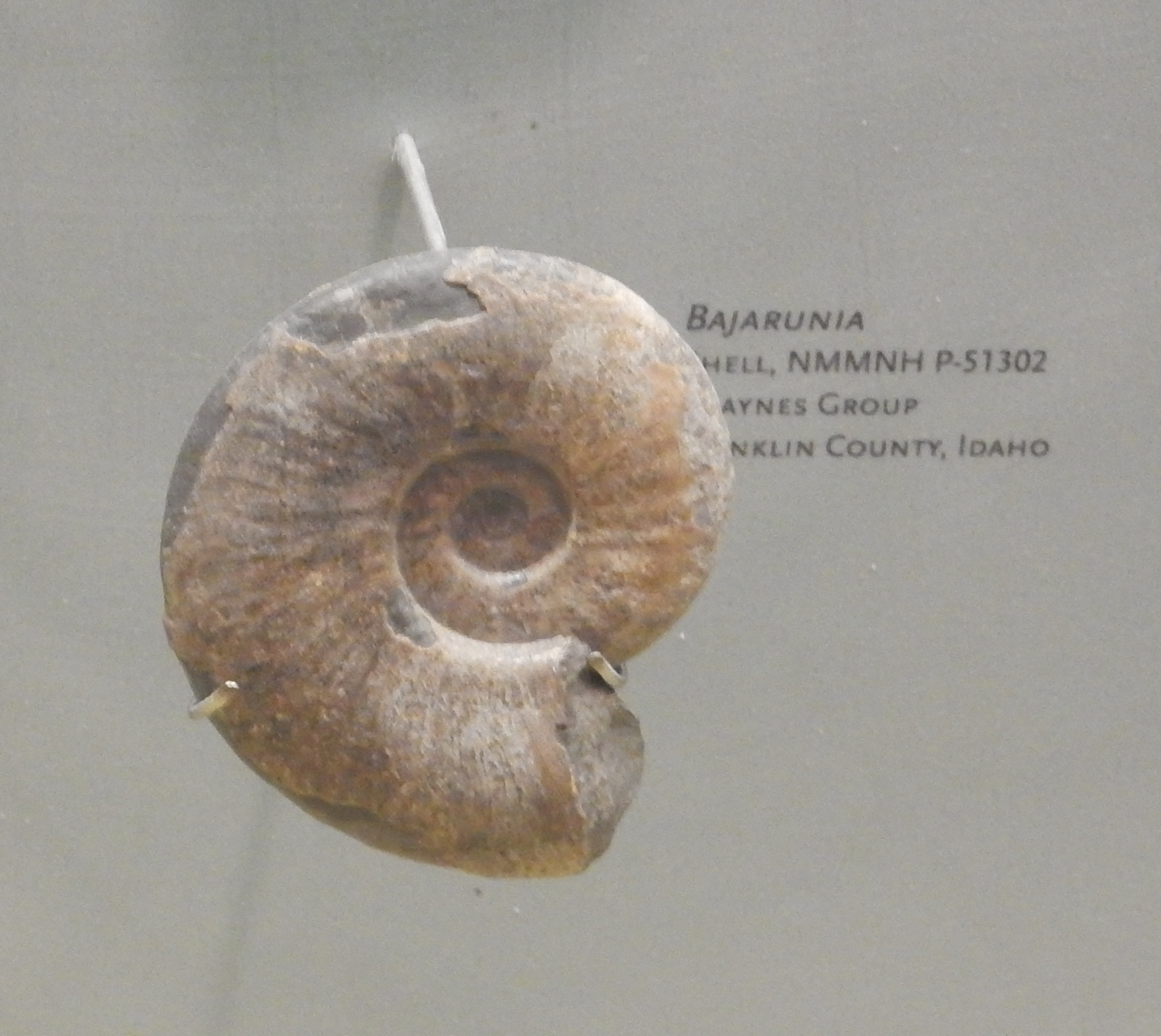
Bajarunia sp. ammonoid fossil

The Paris biota was found in layers dating back to the earliest Spathian, a substage of the Olenekian stage of the Early Triassic epoch. The biostratigraphy is constrained by the presence of the ammonoids Tirolites and Bajarunia, and conodonts. The Tirolites/Columbites beds are dated with 248.853±0.086 Ma. The Paris biota was later also discovered in slightly younger beds in Immigrant Canyon, northeastern Nevada, associated with the ammonoid index fossils Prohungarites sp. and Neopopanoceras haugi, which point to a middle–late Spathian age.

== Palaeogeography and paleoenvironment ==
The organisms of the Paris biota lived in a shallow marine epicontinental sea (western USA basin) on the western coast of Pangea. The sites were located in a near-equatorial position during the Early Triassic epoch.

== Assemblage ==
The Spathian aged Paris biota is one of the earliest diverse fossil assemblages from the post-extinction interval, about 3 million years after the Permian-Triassic mass extinction, and the first one in the wake of the Smithian-Spathian boundary extinction.

The Paris biota comprises fossils belonging to 20 orders or seven phyla: (1) Retaria (foraminifers) (2) sponges, (3) brachiopods (4) mollusks, (5) arthropods, (6) echinoderms and (7) chordates (vertebrates). The assemblage also contains fossil algae and coprolites (trace fossils). Ammonoids and bivalves dominate the fauna. It combines Palaeozoic survivors with members of the Modern evolutionary fauna (i.e., groups that are typical for the Mesozoic and Cenozoic). The Paris biota therefore provides a glimpse at the faunal turnover associated with the largest mass extinction in Earth's history. For example, the biota includes leptomitid protomonaxonid sponges, a group that is otherwise known from the early Paleozoic era (e.g. from the Cambrian Burgess Shale of western Canada). Among the modern clades, it contains a gladius-bearing coleoid cephalopod (Idahoteuthis).

The preservation of Paris biota organisms is considered taxon-dependent, but is not fully understood. The study of some fossils could be improved using synchrotron μXRF imaging.

Most organisms of the Paris biota were described in a thematic issue of the journal Geobios in 2019, but new taxa were also subsequently described.

In 2023, another diverse post-extinction biota was presented from South China, the Dienerian aged Guiyang biota, which includes fossils belonging to twelve classes and 19 orders. The Early Triassic is generally considered as an environmentally unstable and diversity-poor interval, highlighting the importance of the discovery of such diverse lagerstätten.

The following taxa (animals sorted by phylum) were either reported or described from the Paris biota (not listed are the foraminifera and conodonts, which have not yet been described):

=== Sponges ===
Color key: Taxon / Reclassified taxon / Taxon falsely reported as present / Dubious taxon or junior synonym / Ichnotaxon / Ootaxon / Morphotaxon	Notes; Uncertain or tentative taxa are in small text; ~~crossed out~~ taxa are discredited.

Porifera of the Paris biota
Taxon / Genus	Species	Notes
Pseudoleptomitus	P. advenus	A leptomitid protomonaxonid sponge similar to Leptomitus. This group was previously only known from the Cambrian and Ordovician periods

=== Brachiopods ===
Color key: Taxon / Reclassified taxon / Taxon falsely reported as present / Dubious taxon or junior synonym / Ichnotaxon / Ootaxon / Morphotaxon	Notes; Uncertain or tentative taxa are in small text; ~~crossed out~~ taxa are discredited.

Brachiopoda of the Paris biota
Taxon / Genus	Species	Notes
Brachiopoda	Gen. et sp. indet.	An epizoan species closely associated with the sponges
Lingularia	L. borealis	A lingulid
Rhynchonellata	Gen. et sp. indet.	A brachiopod

=== Mollusks ===
Color key: Taxon / Reclassified taxon / Taxon falsely reported as present / Dubious taxon or junior synonym / Ichnotaxon / Ootaxon / Morphotaxon	Notes; Uncertain or tentative taxa are in small text; ~~crossed out~~ taxa are discredited.

Mollusca of the Paris biota
Taxon / Genus	Species	Notes
Albanites	A. americanus	An ammonoid cephalopod
Avichlamys?	A.? csopakensis?	A pectinid bivalve
Bajarunia	B. cf. pilata	An ammonoid cephalopod typical of the earliest Spathian substage
Belemnoidea	Gen. et sp. indet.	Arm hooks of a belemnoid
Caribouceras	C. slugense	An endemic ammonoid cephalopod
Columbites	C. parisianus	An ammonoid cephalopod
Coscaites	C. crassus	An ammonoid cephalopod
Critendenia	C. kummeli	A bivalve
Critendenia	Crittendenia sp.	A claraiid bivalve
Eumorphotis	E. cf. ericius	A heteropectinid bivalve
Eumorphotis	E. multiformis?	A heteropectinid bivalve
Eumorphotis	Eumorphotis sp.	A heteropectinid bivalve
Hedenstroemiidae	Gen. et sp. indet.	An ammonoid cephalopod
Idahoteuthis	I. parisiana	A gladius-bearing coleoid cephalopod
Leptochondria	L. curtocardinalis	A hunanopectinid bivalve
Leptochondria	L. nuetzeli?	A hunanopectinid bivalve
Leptochondria	L. occidanea	A hunanopectinid bivalve
Leptochondria	L. virgalensis?	A hunanopectinid bivalve
Leptochondria	Leptochondria sp.	A hunanopectinid bivalve
Phaedrysmocheilus	P. idahoensis	A nautiloid cephalopod
Pleuronectites	P. meeki	A pectinid bivalve
Scythentolium	Scythentolium sp.	A entoliid bivalve
Tirolites	T. harti	An ammonoid cephalopod typical of the earliest Spathian substage
Tirolites	T. aff. cassianus	An ammonoid cephalopod typical for the earliest Spathian substage
Trematoceras	Trematoceras sp.	An orthoconic nautiloid cephalopod

=== Arthropods ===
Color key: Taxon / Reclassified taxon / Taxon falsely reported as present / Dubious taxon or junior synonym / Ichnotaxon / Ootaxon / Morphotaxon	Notes; Uncertain or tentative taxa are in small text; ~~crossed out~~ taxa are discredited.

Arthropoda of the Paris biota
Taxon / Genus	Species	Notes
Aeger	Aeger sp.	An aegerid prawn
Anisaeger	A. longirostrus	An aegerid prawn
Ankitokazocaris	A. triassica	A thylacocephalan
Caridea	Gen. et sp. indet.	A shrimp
Hoplocarida	Gen. et sp. indet.	A malacostracan crustacean
Ligulacaris	L. parisiana	A thylacocephalan
Limulidae?	Gen. et sp. indet.	A xiphosuran chelicerate
Litogaster	L. turnbullensis?	A glypheid pleocyemate crustacean
Litogaster	Litogaster sp.	A glypheid pleocyemate crustacean
Penaeoidea	Gen. et sp. indet.	A prawn
Pemphix	P. krumenackeri	A glypheid pleocyemate crustacean
Thylacocephala	Gen. et sp. indet.	A thylacocephalan
Triassosculda	T. ahyongi	A mantis shrimp

=== Echinoderms ===
Color key: Taxon / Reclassified taxon / Taxon falsely reported as present / Dubious taxon or junior synonym / Ichnotaxon / Ootaxon / Morphotaxon	Notes; Uncertain or tentative taxa are in small text; ~~crossed out~~ taxa are discredited.

Echinodermata of the Paris biota
Taxon / Genus	Species	Notes
Holocrinus	Holocrinus nov. sp.	A sea lily
Shoshonura	S. brayardi	An ophiacanthid brittle star

=== Chordates ===
Color key: Taxon / Reclassified taxon / Taxon falsely reported as present / Dubious taxon or junior synonym / Ichnotaxon / Ootaxon / Morphotaxon	Notes; Uncertain or tentative taxa are in small text; ~~crossed out~~ taxa are discredited.

Chordata of the Paris biota
Taxon / Genus	Species	Notes
Actinistia	Gen. et sp. indet.	Coelacanth remains
Bobasatrania	Bobasatrania sp.	A bobasatraniiform ray-finned fish. Complete specimens
Hybodontiformes	Gen. et sp. indet. A	A slab with several hybodontiform chondrichthyan teeth showing a heterodont durophagous dentition
Hybodontiformes	Gen. et sp. indet. B	A single hybodontiform tooth
Osteichthyes	Gen. et sp. indet.	Tooth plate
Vertebrata	indet.	coprolites referrable to large vertebrate producers

=== Algae ===
Color key: Taxon / Reclassified taxon / Taxon falsely reported as present / Dubious taxon or junior synonym / Ichnotaxon / Ootaxon / Morphotaxon	Notes; Uncertain or tentative taxa are in small text; ~~crossed out~~ taxa are discredited.

Algae of the Paris biota
Taxon / Genus	Species	Notes
Algae	Gen. et ap. indet.	Filamental algae and other algae
Dasycladales	Gen. et ap. indet.	An unicellular green algae
Rhodophyta	Gen. et ap. indet.	A red algae

== See also ==
- Triassic
- Lagerstätten
- Paleontology in Idaho
- Paleontology in Nevada
