= Virgin Formation =

Geologic formation in Utah, United States

- Stratigraphic range: Spathian
- Type: Formation
- Unit of: Thaynes Group
- Thickness: 150 m (490 ft)

Lithology
- Primary: Limestone
- Other: Siltstone, shale

Location
- Coordinates: 37°12′6″N 113°11′23″W
- Region: Utah
- Country: United States

Type section
- Named for: Virgin, Utah
- Named by: Bassler and Reeside
- Year defined: 1921
- Virgin Formation (the United States) Virgin Formation (Utah)

The Virgin Formation is a geologic formation in Utah. It preserves fossils dating back to the Triassic period (Spathian substage).

== Description ==
The Virgin Formation consists of gray to yellowish gray to greenish gray limestone, occasionally fossiliferous, alternating with greenish yellow to reddish brown to gray shale or siltstone. The limestone beds are up to 20 feet (6.1 m) thick. Total thickness of the formation is up to 150 meters (490 ft). About 30% of the total section of the formation is limestone.

The formation rests on the "lower red member" of the Moenkopi Group and underlies the Shnabkaib Member of the Moenkopi Group. More recently, the Virgin Formation is interpreted as a formation of the Thaynes Group.

The formation is interpreted as having been deposited in a near-shore shallow marine environment. The lower part shows cyclic sedimentation, while the upper part of the formation to the southeast was deposited in lagoons in an arid climate while marine deposition continued to the north.

== Fossils ==
The formation contains marine fossils, including crinoids, pelecypods, gastropods, worms, crustaceans, and the ammonoid Tirolites. The latter is characteristic of the early Spathian stage of the Early Triassic.

== History of investigation ==
The unit was first named as the Virgin limestone member of the Moenkopi Formation in 1922, by Harvey Bassler and John Reeside. The unit was promoted to formation rank (and the Moenkopi Formation to group rank) in southwestern Utah) by S.J. Poborski in 1954.

== See also ==
- List of fossiliferous stratigraphic units in Utah
- Paleontology in Utah

== See also ==
- Various Contributors to the Paleobiology Database. "Fossilworks: Gateway to the Paleobiology Database". Archived from the original on 25 March 2022.
