= Sinbad Formation =

Geologic formation in Utah, United States

- Stratigraphic range: Early Triassic Epoch
- Diagram of San Rafael Swell Moenkopi Members
- Type: Formation
- Unit of: Thaynes Group
- Underlies: Torrey Member
- Overlies: Black Dragon Member
- Area: Canyonlands National Park
- Thickness: 10–103 feet

Location
- Region: Utah
- Country: United States

Type section
- Named by: James Gilluly and J.B. Reeside Jr.

The Sinbad Formation is a geologic formation in Utah initially named and described by James Gilluly and J. B. Reeside Junior in the 1920s. It is known for preserving fossils dating back to the Early Triassic epoch.

Originally described as the Sinbad Limestone Member, it was one of four members in the San Rafael Swell including also the Black Dragon Member, Torrey Member and Moody Canyon Member. The Sinbad Limestone Member was considered a portion of the greater Moenkopi Formation. It was recently elevated to formation rank, as the Sinbad Formation, and referred to the Thaynes Group.

The Sinbad Formation is made up of beds of yellowish-gray limestone, dolomite, quartz sandstone, siltstone and, conglomerate rock. These beds range in thickness from 10 ft (3.0 m) to 103 ft (31 m) and hold fossils of Meekoceras ammonoid fauna from the Olenekian stage (Smithian substage). The area was once covered in shallow seawater that deposited sediments and marine life that would later comprise the sandstone formation. The formation has been researched and characterized by scientists since its initial discovery in 1928. In addition to research performed on the formation's geology and fossil stores scientists have also prospected the area for oil and other valuable natural resources. Although the formation appears to have characteristics of an oil reserve the Sinbad Formation has not undergone significant drilling.

== Geography ==
San Rafael Swell

The Sinbad limestone is found in two locations near the junction of the Green and Colorado Rivers. It is found within the Moenkopi formations in the San Rafael Swell, Capital Reef, and the northern part of Circle Cliffs.

== Geology ==
Through the Triassic period, the Colorado Plateau in which the Moenkopi resides was covered sometimes by the epicontinental sea that both eroded and deposited rock fragments, including those of other major geologic formations. Named by Gilluly and Reeside in 1928, the Sinbad unit stands out in a siliceous clastic sequence as a lone carbonate unit, a conspicuous feature shared by the Thaynes group to the west that has caused its membership to the San Rafael Swell to be questioned. However, its noticeably different composition allows for easy identification of formations in an area that is otherwise difficult to subdivide. Sinbad's southeastern boundaries are difficult to locate, where the carbonate that characterizes the formation becomes sandy and hard to trace. In many places, the Sinbad member overlaps with the Black Dragon and Torrey members, and their limestone, siltstone and sandstone beds interweave.

The Sinbad member consists of three layers: the basal, fossil bearing unit, the middle calcilutite part, and a top dolomitized calcarenite layer. It is a combination of limestone and five to twenty percent siltstone depending on the location. The makeup and location of the formation gives it viability as an oil reservoir. The formation is primarily composed of limestone, siltstone, and dolomite. It is due to this makeup that the formation has potential as an oil reservoir. The viability as a reserve depends upon the fractures and connectivity throughout the formation.

The Sinbad ranges in color from orange to yellow to gray, and is made up of benches and cliffs depending on the thickness of the dolomite and limestone. Calcareous siltstone is also present, along with minerals quartz, feldspar, muscovite, limonite, hematite and pyrite. These minerals appear as silt, sand, impurities, and void fillings. The Sinbad's lithologic make up causes it to weather platy or massive depending on the rock structure.

Bimodal currents are suggested by herringbone cross-stratification, in the Sinbad's sedimentary rock, and the formation includes sets of planar-wedge cross-stratification. The formation is thicker in the northwest margins, and its thickest exposed segment is 103 feet, though it is usually less than 10 feet thick. The Sinbad member can be seen around the perimeter of mesas up to 2 square miles large.

== Fossils ==
The Sinbad Limestone gastropod fauna is notable as it offers the most diverse array of known Early Triassic fauna in one location. It has 16 genera and 26 species, 22 of which were unknown in 1986 and consists of large amounts of embryonic shells and unidentifiable species in coquinas. A few species of pelecypods found here, but the collection is not as diverse as that of the gastropods. In addition, a handful of Ammonite, sponges, and echinoderms specimens have been identified in the Sinbad Limestone Formation. Conodonts are present in the formation but have not been previously studied. The Sinbad formation demonstrates the reaches of the Early Triassic sea. Many types of ripple marks and trace fossils from animals moving through the sediment can be found in the area.

The majority of the research done on Sinbad and the underlying Black Dragon member of the San Rafael Swell is done by Dr. Ron Blakey.

== Natural resources ==
The Sinbad Limestone of the greater Moenkopi formation lies at the Northern end the San Rafael Swell in the state of Utah. Portions of the San Rafael Swell region, including the Sinbad Limestone, have been prospected for oil and other minerals as early as 1918 and more recently in 2007. The Sinbad Limestone formation and the greater San Rafael Swell region have been shown to host four main geological resources: oil and gas, gypsum, and uranium and vanadium minerals. The formation can be considered a potential producer of oil, although it is not large enough to be considered as a major source.

=== Gypsum deposits ===
Although some Gypsum exists in the Sinbad Limestone formation the supply is limited and the resource is only found in small veins and formations. The gypsum resources in the San Rafael area as a whole are quite large, with beds ranging from 6 to 30 feet deep. Gypsum was not mined and sold in the area at the time of discovery due to the distance to market; the travel expenses would have made the venture too costly.

=== Uranium deposits ===
Uranium and vanadium mineral resources of the San Rafael Swell region vary, and multiple prospecting missions for the ore found no significant deposits in the Sinbad Limestone formation.

=== Oil and gas reservoirs ===
Oil and gas resources have been found throughout the San Rafael Swell region including deposits in the Sinbad Limestone formation. The initial oil prospecting period from 1918 to 1922 found oil and gas deposits in the limestone formation. Although oil has been produced from the Sinbad Limestone formation in small quantities from a well at Grassy Trail Creek Field the Sinbad Formation as a whole has not been heavily drilled. Recent prospecting missions have shown the presence of ooids and oolite shoals in the microfacies of the Sinbad Limestone formation. Limestone formations perform well as oil reservoirs, and studies have encouraged further exploration of the Sinbad Limestone for oil resources.

=== Other resources ===
Local communities have taken sandstone blocks for building from the Sinbad Formation in the past. Other resources including small volumes of copper and larger volumes of gravel have been taken from the surrounding area in the past.

== Tourism ==
Canyonlands National Park, Utah

The easternmost limit of the Lower Triassic Sinbad Limestone formation lies in Canyonlands National Park, Utah. Other portions of the Sinbad Limestone formation and the San Rafael Swell region host hikers and mountain bikers on variety of trails and roads. Some of the most popular trails include Wedge Overlook, Little Wild Horse and Bell Canyon Loop, Horseshoe Canyon, and the San Rafael Reef.

== See also ==
- List of fossiliferous stratigraphic units in Utah
- Moenkopi Formation
- Paleontology in Utah
