= Thaynes Group =

Geologic group in the northwestern US

- Stratigraphic range: Triassic
- Type: Group
- Sub-units: Sinbad Formation, Virgin Formation, Shnabkaib Formation
- Underlies: Chinle Group
- Overlies: Kaibab Formation

Lithology
- Primary: Limestone
- Other: Shales, Siltstone

Location
- Region: Idaho, Nevada, Utah, Wyoming
- Country: United States

Type section
- Named by: T.H. Goodspeed

The Thaynes Group, Thaynes Formation in older literature, is a geologic group in eastern Idaho, western Wyoming, Utah and eastern Nevada. It includes the Sinbad Formation, Virgin Formation and Shnabkaib Formation. The Thaynes Group is of marine origin. Its formations are interbedded with layers of the non-marine Moenkopi Group.

It preserves fossils dating back to the Early Triassic epoch (Olenekian stage). The Lower Limestone Member contains the Paris biota lagerstätte, one of the first diverse assemblages of the Mesozoic era.

== See also ==
- List of fossiliferous stratigraphic units in Idaho
- Paleontology in Idaho
- List of fossiliferous stratigraphic units in Nevada
- Paleontology in Nevada
- List of fossiliferous stratigraphic units in Utah
- Paleontology in Utah
- List of fossiliferous stratigraphic units in Wyoming
- Paleontology in Wyoming
