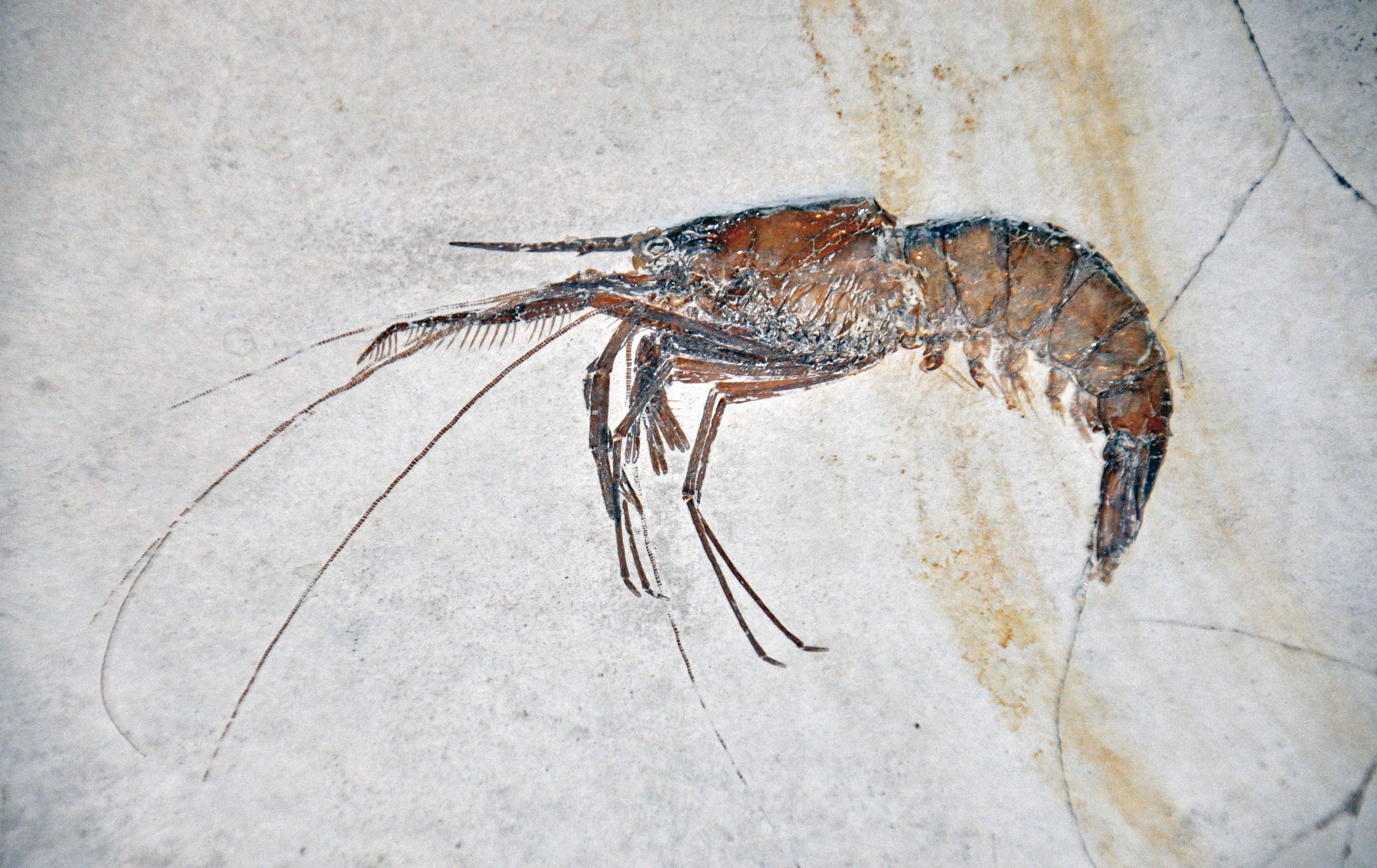
- Aeger tipularius from the Solnhofen Limestone

Scientific classification
- Kingdom: Animalia
- Phylum: Arthropoda
- Class: Malacostraca
- Order: Decapoda
- Suborder: Dendrobranchiata
- Family: †Aegeridae
- Genus: †Aeger
- Species: †A. tipularius

Binomial name
- †Aeger tipularius Schlotheim, 1822

= Aeger tipularius =

Aeger tipularius Temporal range: Late Jurassic

Species of crustacean

Aeger tipularius is a species of fossil prawn from the Solnhofen Limestone. The Natural History Museum in London has a fossil specimen.

== Gallery ==
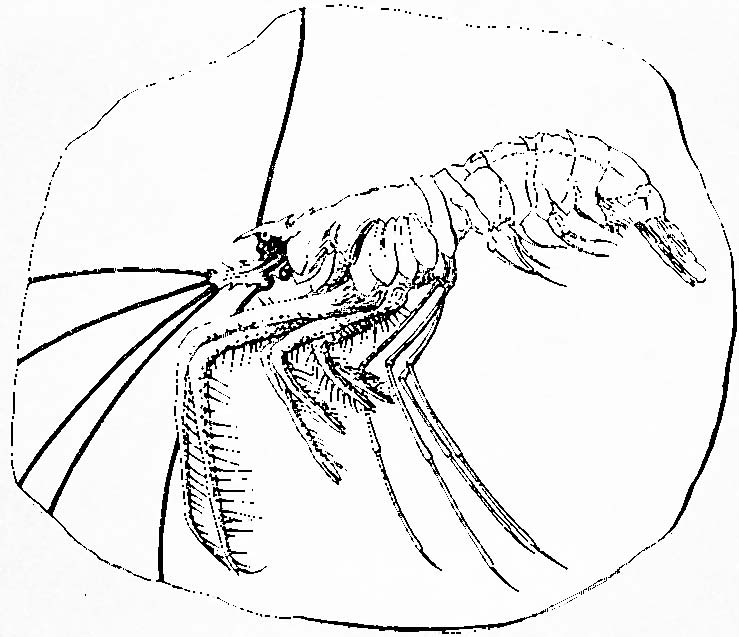
Aeger tipularius holotype, drawing by Schlotheim, 1822

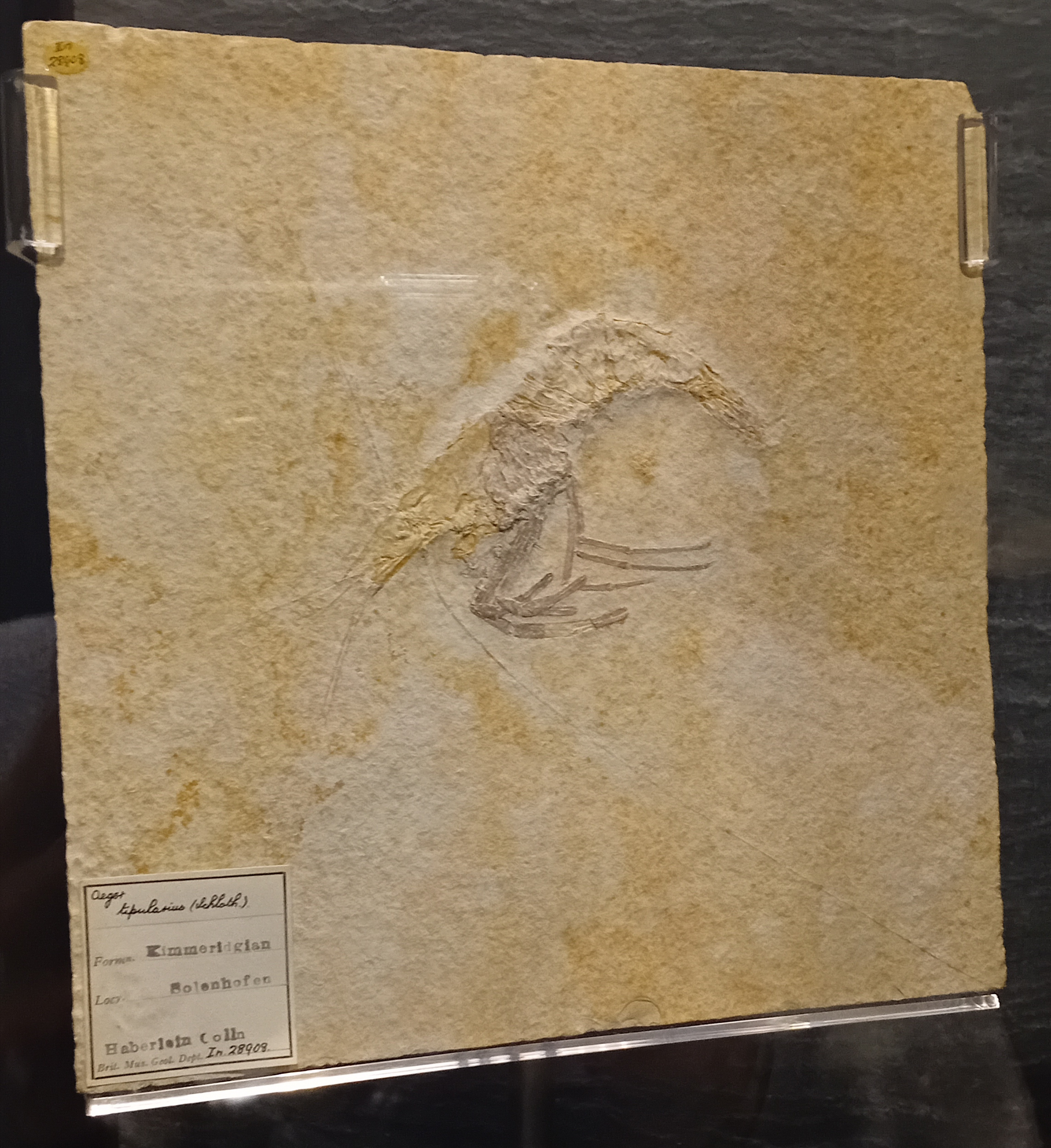
Specimen at the NHM
