= Guiyang biota =

Geological formation in China

- Stratigraphic range: late Induan, 250.83–250.72 Ma
- Type: Geological formation
- Thickness: ~10 meters

Lithology
- Primary: Shale, limestone

Location
- Region: Guiyang, south China
- Country: China
- Guiyang biota (China)

The Guiyang biota is an exceptionally preserved Early Triassic (approximately 250.8 million years ago) fossil assemblage from the Daye Formation near Guiyang (China), discovered between 2015 and 2019 and first reported in 2023. It is the oldest known Mesozoic lagerstätte, and it provides evidence of the existence of a complex marine ecosystem shortly after the Permian–Triassic extinction event.

== Palaeogeography and palaeoclimate ==
The Guiyang biota comes from the northern margin of the Nanpanjang Basin, that was a Triassic equatorial foreland basin on the eastern side of the Tethys Ocean.

The presence of a rich biota in a near-Equatorial paleolatitude implies that, immediately after the Permian extinction event, global temperatures must have been tolerable for life even at the tropics - it was previously thought that the greenhouse climate would have reduced or eliminated biodiversity at low latitudes. The estimated sea surface temperature was about 35 °C.

== Age ==
The Guiyang biota belongs to the late Dienerian, a subsection of the Induan period of early Triassic.The biostratigraphy evidenced by the Radioceras ammonoids and the Neospathodus cristagalli and Neospathodus dieneri conodonts is consistent with the Dienerian, and uranium–lead zircon dating confirms the strata span about 110,000 years, between 250.83 and 250.72 millions of years ago, 1.08 millions of years after the Permian extinction.

== Ecosystem ==
=== Species ===
The biota is rich in bony fishes. Teeth of Chondrichthyes are also present. Two coelacanth species, ranging between 50 and 100 cm, are the largest animals so far identified; the presence of these relatively large predators suggests the ecosystem was fully functional. Actinopterygii are represented by ten species in six orders: Palaeonisciformes, Ptycholepiformes, Acipenseriformes, Perleidiformes, Polzbergiiformes and Parasemionotiformes.

Most Guiyang fossils are crustaceans. Decapoda are represented, among others, by two of the oldest shrimps ever found: one a species of the genus Anisaeger and the other an undetermined member of Aegeridae. A lobster was also present. Other crustaceans are ostracods and Cyclida, one of the latter similar but not identical to Yunnanocyclus nodosus. Among molluscs, two ammonoids have been reported, Pseudosageceras and Radioceras, and four bivalve genera, Claraia, Eumorphotis, Modiolus and Scythentolium. Sponges are represented by several spicules.

The Guiyang biota presents one of the richest Dienerian foraminifer fauna known so far, with seven species (including Postcladella kalhori). Also present is the radiolarian Latentifistula.

=== Complexity ===
The Guiyang biota includes species from all the trophic levels expected in a marine ecosystem -from primary consumers to apex predators, and it is comparable to other, younger Triassic biotas (e.g., the Paris biota, Guanling biota). The presence of such a complete ecosystem implies that either components of all trophic levels managed to survive the Permian-Triassic extinction event, or they re-evolved very rapidly.

== See also ==
- Lagerstätten
- Triassic
- Permian-Triassic mass extinction
