= Beatites =

Beatites Temporal range: Early Triassic

Scientific classification
- Kingdom: Animalia
- Phylum: Mollusca
- Class: Cephalopoda
- Subclass: †Ammonoidea
- Order: †Ceratitida
- Family: †Hedenstroemiidae
- Genus: †Beatites; Artharber, 1911

Genus of molluscs (fossil)

Beatites is a genus of Lower Triassic ammonites characterized by a somewhat strongly involute and greatly compressed shell with a sharp, oxyconic, venter. Beatites was first found in Albania and is assigned to the ceratatiid family Hedenstroemiidae.
