= Anisaeger =

Anisaeger Temporal range: Early Triassic–Middle Triassic

Scientific classification
- Kingdom: Animalia
- Phylum: Arthropoda
- Class: Malacostraca
- Order: Decapoda
- Suborder: Dendrobranchiata
- Family: †Aegeridae
- Genus: †Anisaeger; Schweitzer et al., 2014

Type species
- Anisaeger brevirostrus Schweitzer et al., 2014

Extinct genus of crustaceans

Anisaeger is a genus of fossil prawns first described from the Luoping biota of the middle Triassic of China but also known from the Guiyang biota and Paris biota of the early Triassic.

== Species ==
As of 2022, the following four species are included in the genus:

- Anisaeger atavus (Bill, 1914)
- Anisaeger brevirostrus Schweitzer et al., 2014
- Anisaeger crassipes (Bronn, 1858)
- Anisaeger longirostrus Smith et al., 2022

Anisaeger spinifera now bears the name Acanthochirana spinifera.
