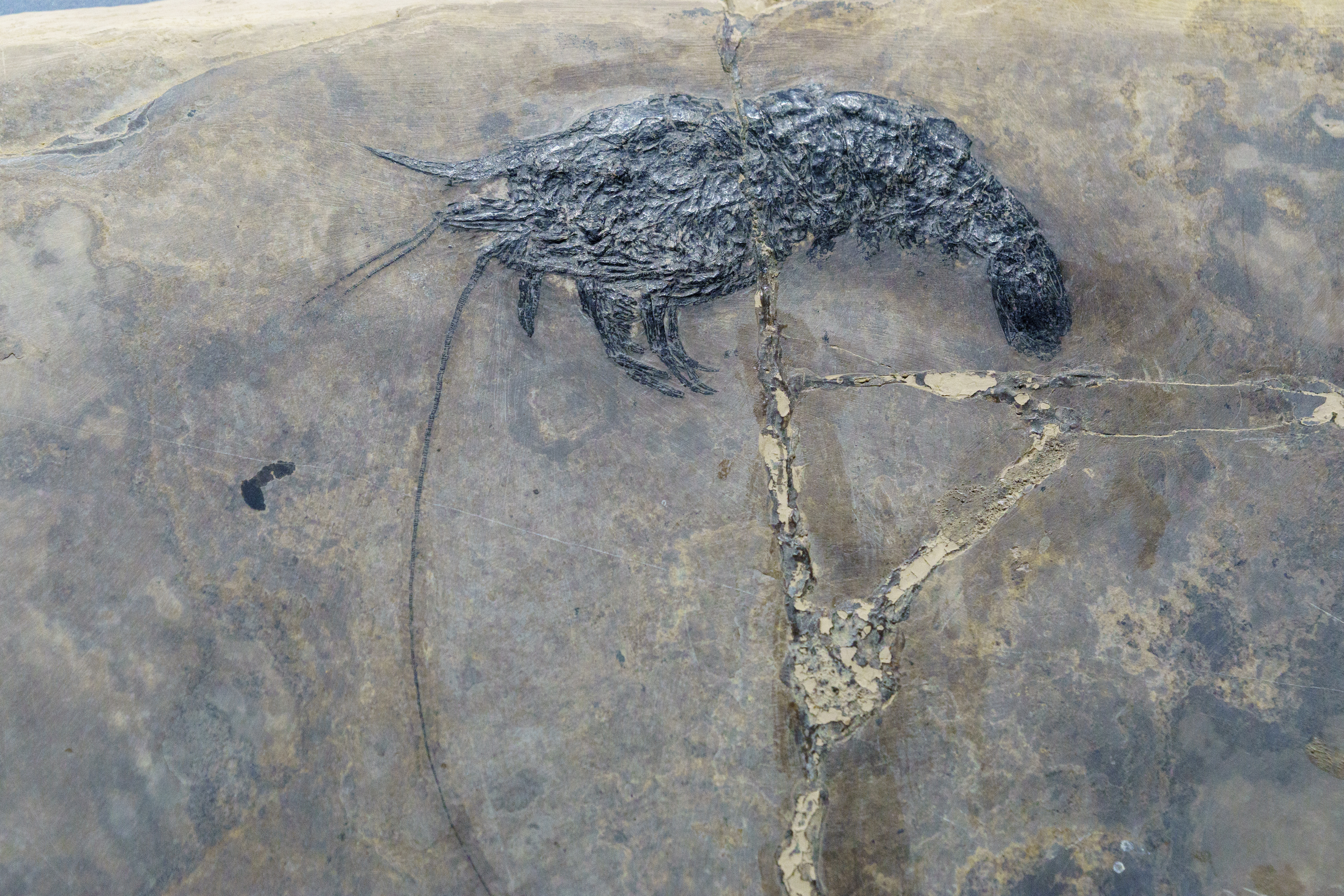
- Fossil of D. prodigiosus

Scientific classification
- Kingdom: Animalia
- Phylum: Arthropoda
- Class: Malacostraca
- Order: Decapoda
- Suborder: Dendrobranchiata
- Family: †Aegeridae
- Genus: †Distaeger; Schweitzer et al., 2014

Species
- †D. prodigiosus

= Distaeger =

Distaeger Temporal range: Middle Triassic

Extinct genus of crustaceans

Distaeger is a genus of fossil prawns first described from the Luoping biota of the middle Triassic of China. It includes one species, D. prodigiosus. The taxonomy of this species is disputed and it has been suggested that it should not be included in the family Aegeridae, but still be included somewhere in Penaeoidea in an unspecified different family.
