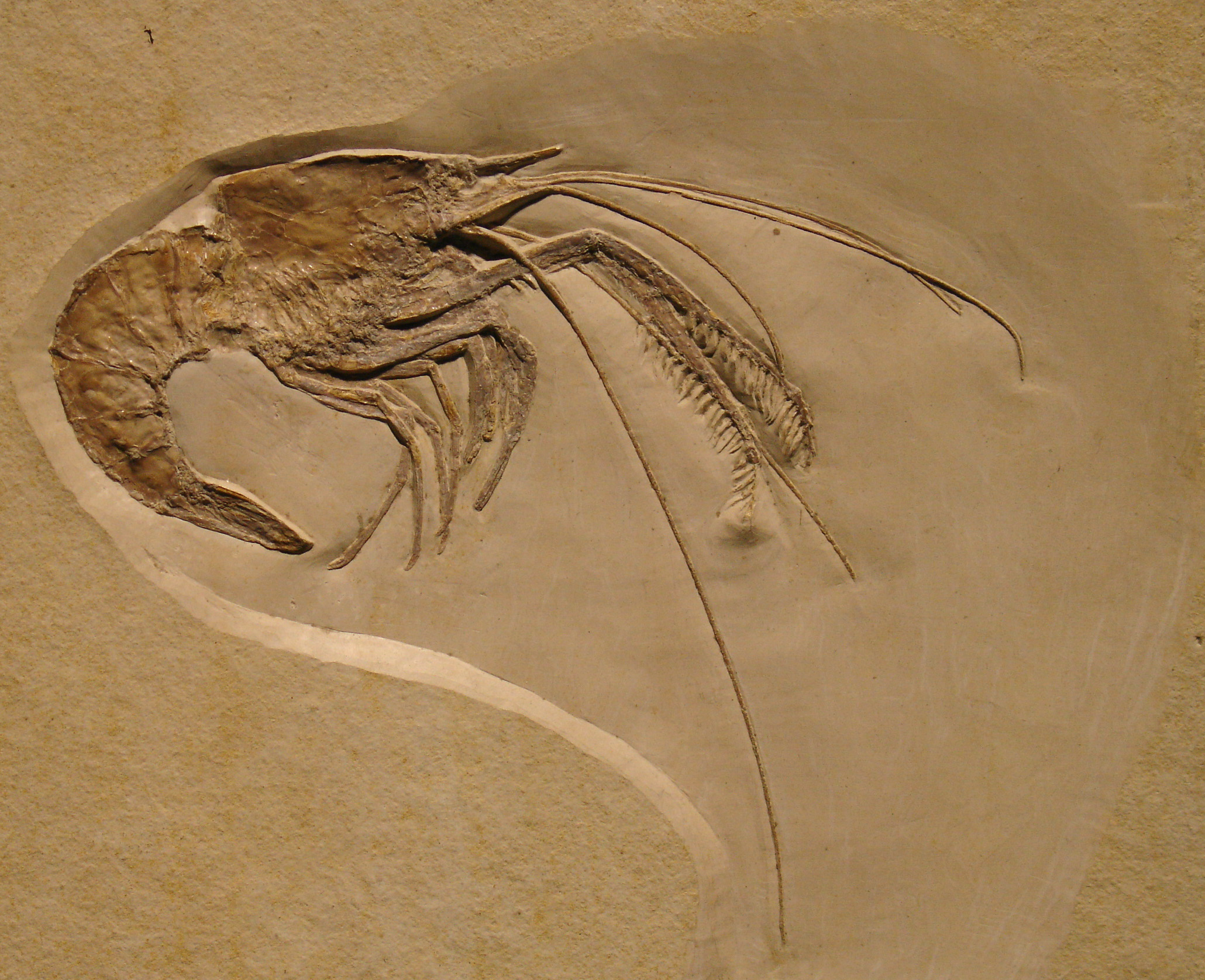
- Aeger elegans, the exhibit from the Museum of Natural History in Berlin (Museum für Naturkunde)

Scientific classification
- Domain: Eukaryota
- Kingdom: Animalia
- Phylum: Arthropoda
- Class: Malacostraca
- Order: Decapoda
- Suborder: Dendrobranchiata
- Family: †Aegeridae
- Genus: †Aeger
- Species: †A. elegans

Binomial name
- †Aeger elegans Münster, 1839

= Aeger elegans =

Aeger elegans Temporal range: Upper Jurassic

Extinct species of crustacean

Aeger elegans is a species of fossil prawn from the Solnhofen Plattenkalk.
