= Mesohedenstroemia =

Mesohedenstroemia Temporal range: 252.3–247.2 Ma

Scientific classification
- Domain: Eukaryota
- Kingdom: Animalia
- Phylum: Mollusca
- Class: Cephalopoda
- Subclass: †Ammonoidea
- Order: †Ceratitida
- Family: †Hedenstroemiidae
- Genus: †Mesohedenstroemia; Chao, 1959

Species
- M. kwangsiana Chao, 1959; M. inflata Chao, 1959; M. planata Chao 1959; M. bosphorensis (Zakharov, 1968); M. olgae Zakharov & Abnavi, 2012

Genus of molluscs (fossil)

Mesohedenstroemia is a genus of ammonites. It was described by Chao in 1959, who described three species; M. kwangsiana (the type species), M. inflata Chao, 1959, and M. planata, from the Triassic of what is now China. A new species, M. olgae, was described from the Olenekian of Russia by Yuri D. Zakharov and Nasrin Mousavi Abnavi in 2012, and was named in honour of Olga P. Smyshyaeva.

== Distribution ==
China and Russia
