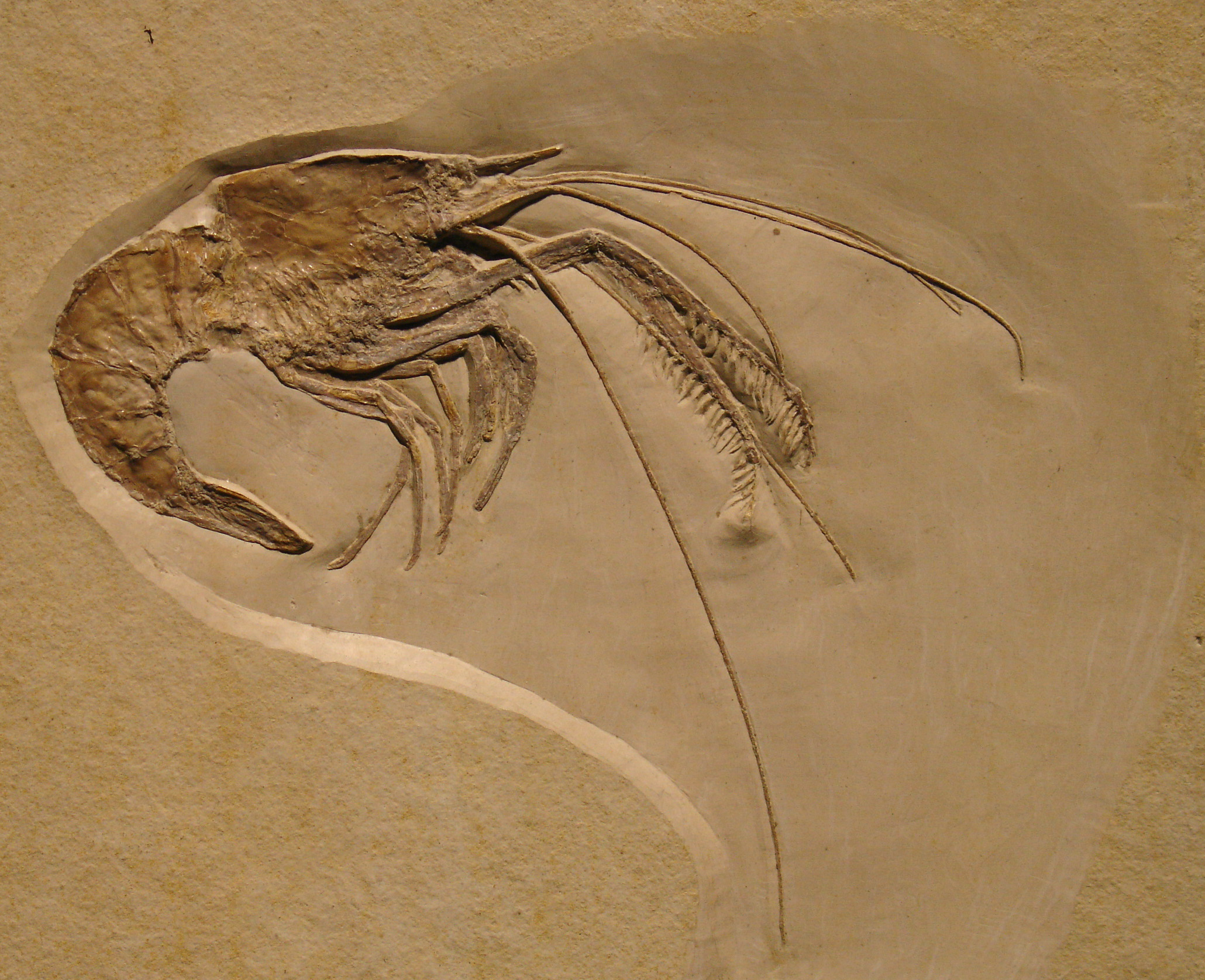
- Aeger elegans

Scientific classification
- Kingdom: Animalia
- Phylum: Arthropoda
- Class: Malacostraca
- Order: Decapoda
- Suborder: Dendrobranchiata
- Superfamily: Penaeoidea
- Family: †Aegeridae
- Genus: †Aeger; Münster, 1839

Type species
- Macrourites tipularius Schlotheim, 1822

= Aeger =

Aeger Temporal range: Middle Triassic–Cretaceous

Extinct genus of crustaceans

Aeger is a genus of fossil prawns. They first occur in the Early Triassic (Paris biota), and died out at the end of the Late Cretaceous. A total of 21 species are known, which makes this the most diverse genus in the family Aegeridae.

== Species ==
As of 2022, this is a complete list of species in the genus.

- Aeger brevirostris Van Straelen, 1923
- Aeger brodiei Woodward, 1888
- Aeger elegans Münster, 1839
- Aeger elongatus Garassino & Teruzzi, 1990
- Aeger foersteri Garassino & Teruzzi, 1990
- Aeger fraconicus Förster, 1980
- Aeger gracilis Förster & Crane, 1984
- Aeger hidalguensis Feldmann et al., 2007
- Aeger insignis Oppel, 1862
- Aeger laevis (Blake, 1876)
- Aeger lehmanni (Langenhan, 1910)
- Aeger libanensis Roger, 1946
- Aeger luxii Huang et al., 2013
- Aeger macropus Garassino & Teruzzi, 1990
- Aeger marderi Woodward, 1866
- Aeger muensteri Garassino & Teruzzi, 1990
- Aeger robustus Garassino & Teruzzi, 1990
- Aeger rostrospinatus Garassino & Teruzzi, 1990
- Aeger spinipes (Desmarest, 1822)
- Aeger straeleni Glaessner, 1929
- Aeger tipularius (Schlotheim, 1822) (=A. armatus Oppel, 1862)
