= Chimney Rock (Capitol Reef National Park) =

Geological formation in the American state of Utah

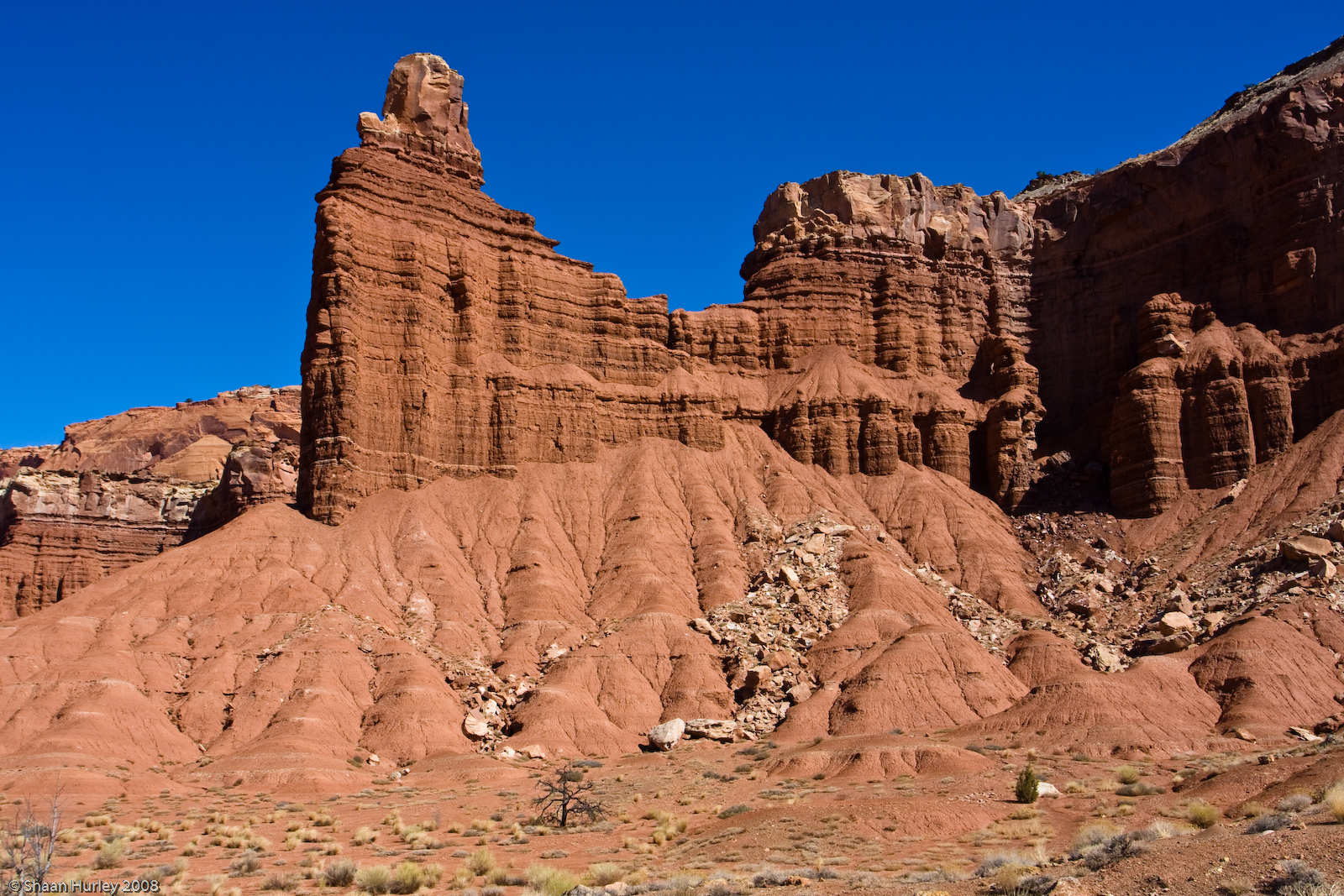
- Chimney Rock, south-southwest aspect

Highest point
- Elevation: 6,420 ft (1,960 m)
- Prominence: 80 ft (24 m)
- Parent peak: Mummy Cliff
- Isolation: 0.34 mi (0.55 km)
- Coordinates: 38°18′51″N 111°18′00″W

Geography
- Location within Utah Location within the United States
- Country: United States
- State: Utah
- County: Wayne
- Protected area: Capitol Reef National Park
- Parent range: Colorado Plateau
- Topo map: USGS Twin Rocks

Geology
- Rock age: Triassic

Climbing
- Easiest route: closed to climbing

Chimney Rock is a 6,420-foot (1,960 m) summit in Capitol Reef National Park in Wayne County, Utah, United States. This landmark is situated 2.5 mi (4.0 km) northwest of the park's visitor center, towering over 300 feet (91 m) above Utah State Route 24. Chimney Rock is also 2.5 mi (4.0 km) northwest of another of the park's landmarks, The Castle. Precipitation runoff from this feature ends up in the Colorado River drainage basin. The Chimney Rock Trail is a 3.5-mile loop trail that takes hikers to a view of Chimney Rock from above Mummy Cliffs.

== Geology ==
This feature is an erosional remnant composed of red sandstone of the Moenkopi Formation, topped with a Shinarump Conglomerate caprock of the Chinle Formation. The Moenkopi Formation dates to about 245 million years ago, having formed during the Triassic. Long after the sedimentary rocks were deposited, the Colorado Plateau was uplifted relatively evenly, keeping the layers roughly horizontal, but Capitol Reef is an exception because of the Waterpocket Fold, a classic monocline, which formed between 50 and 70 million years ago during the Laramide Orogeny.

== Gallery ==
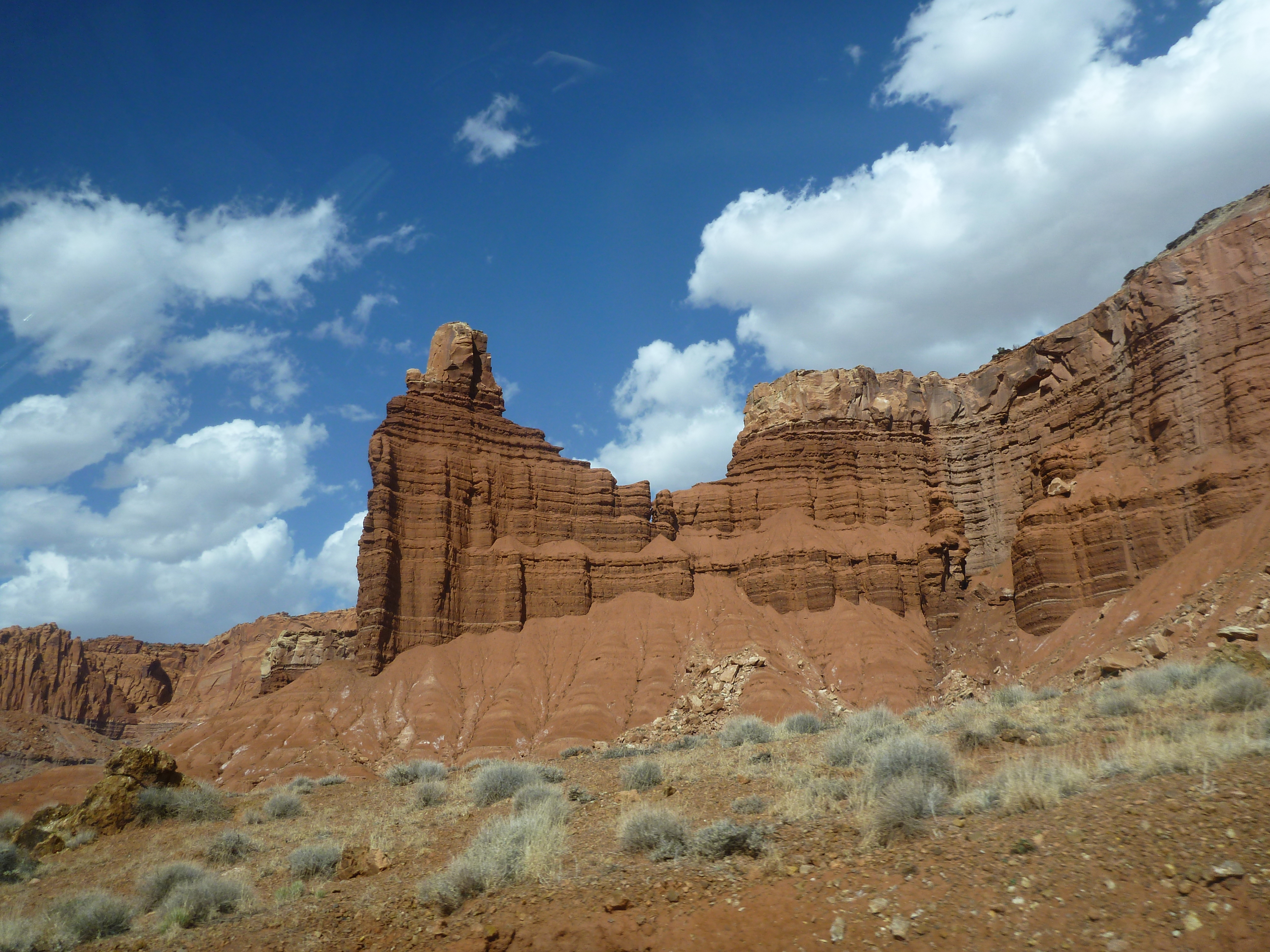
South aspect

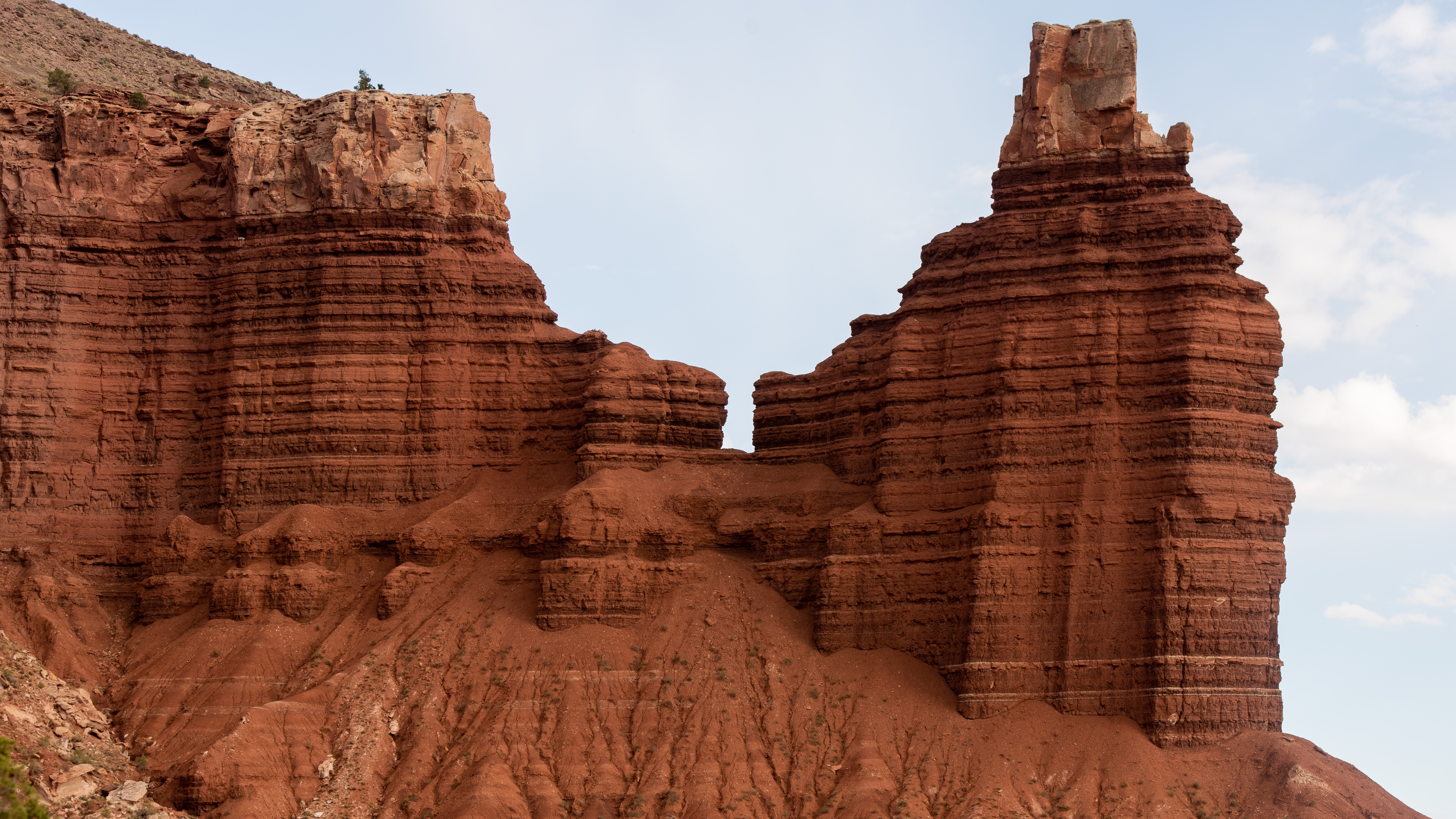
North aspect

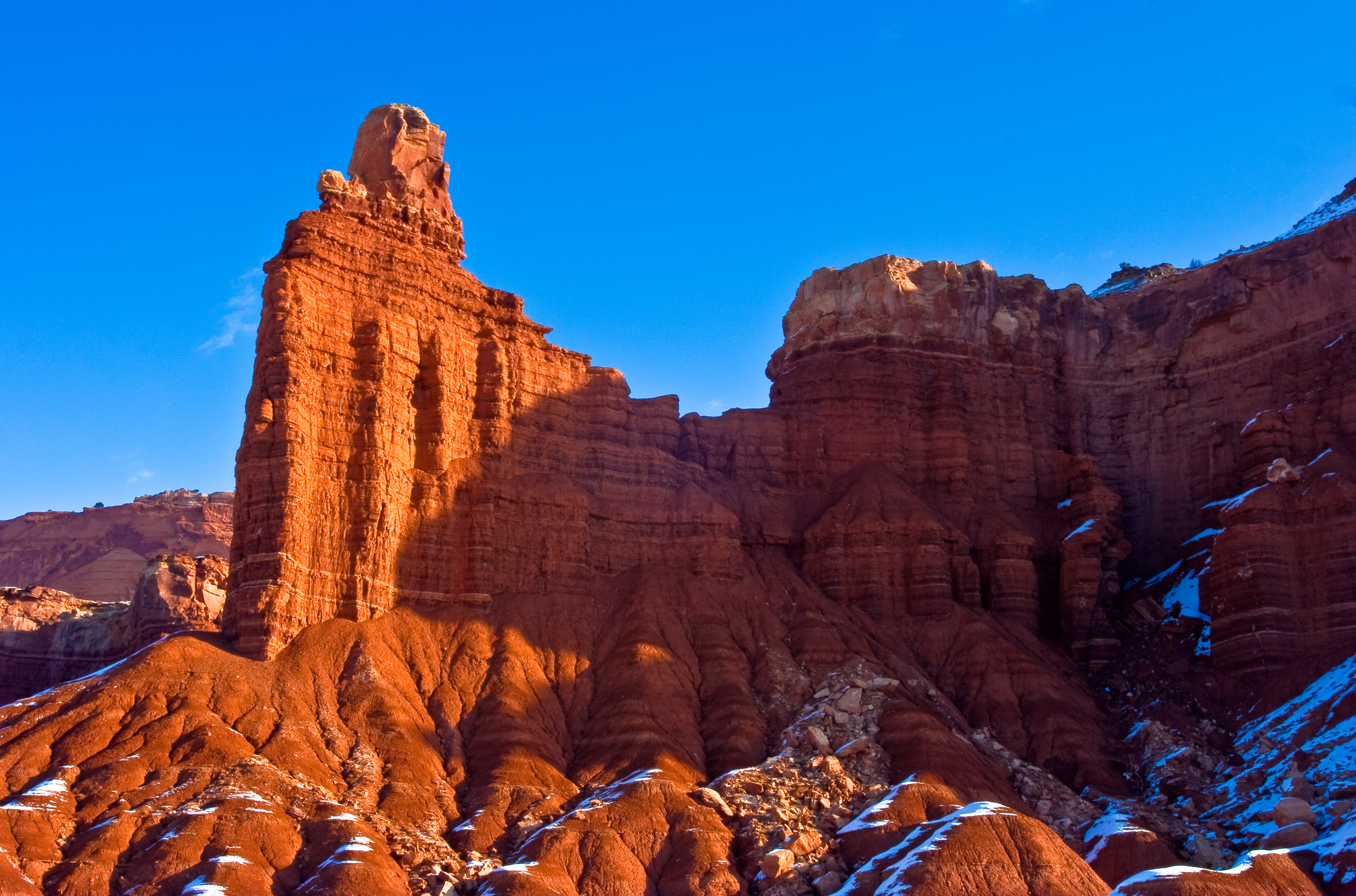

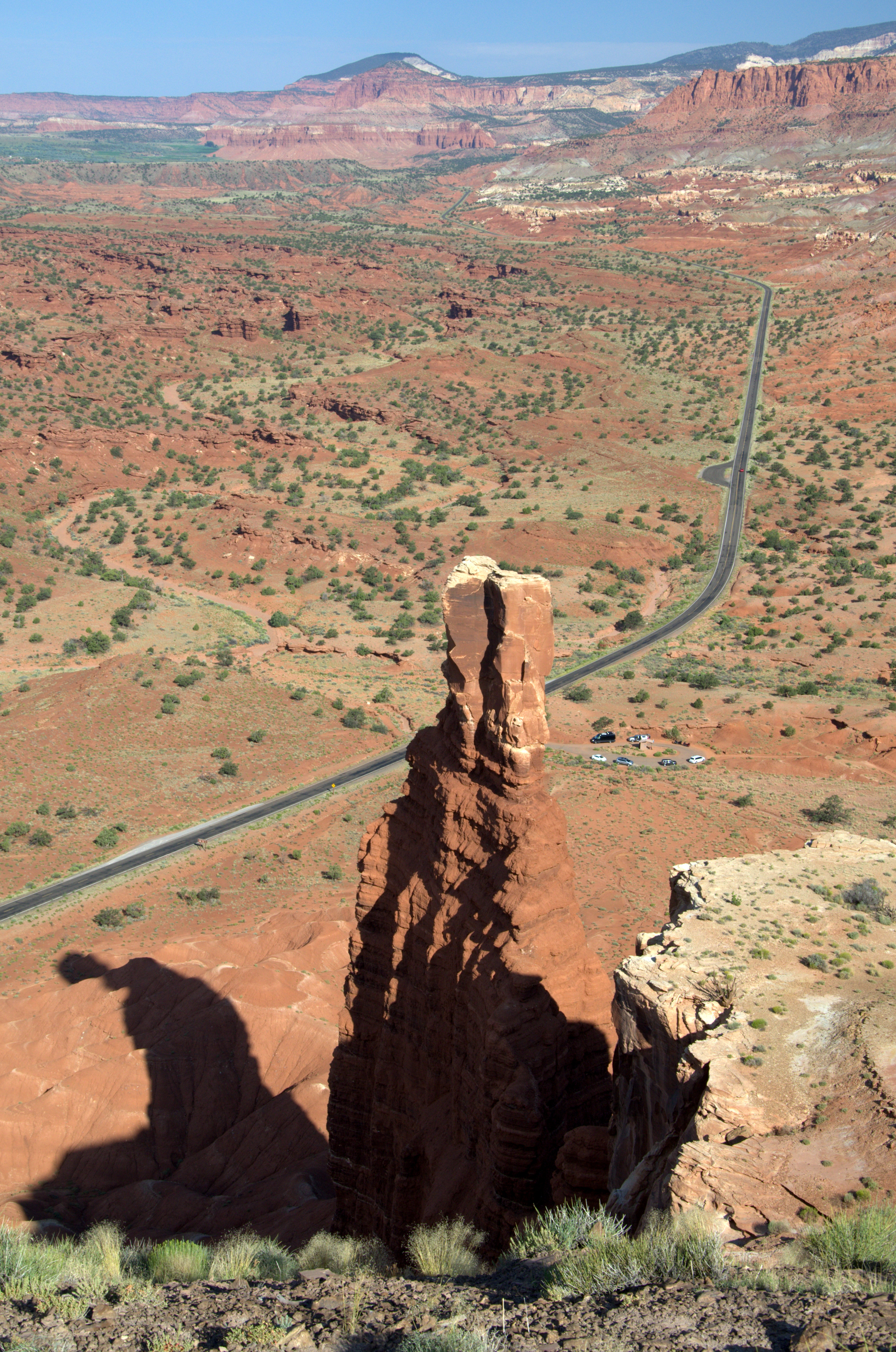
Looking WNW at Chimney Rock, Hwy 24, and trailhead

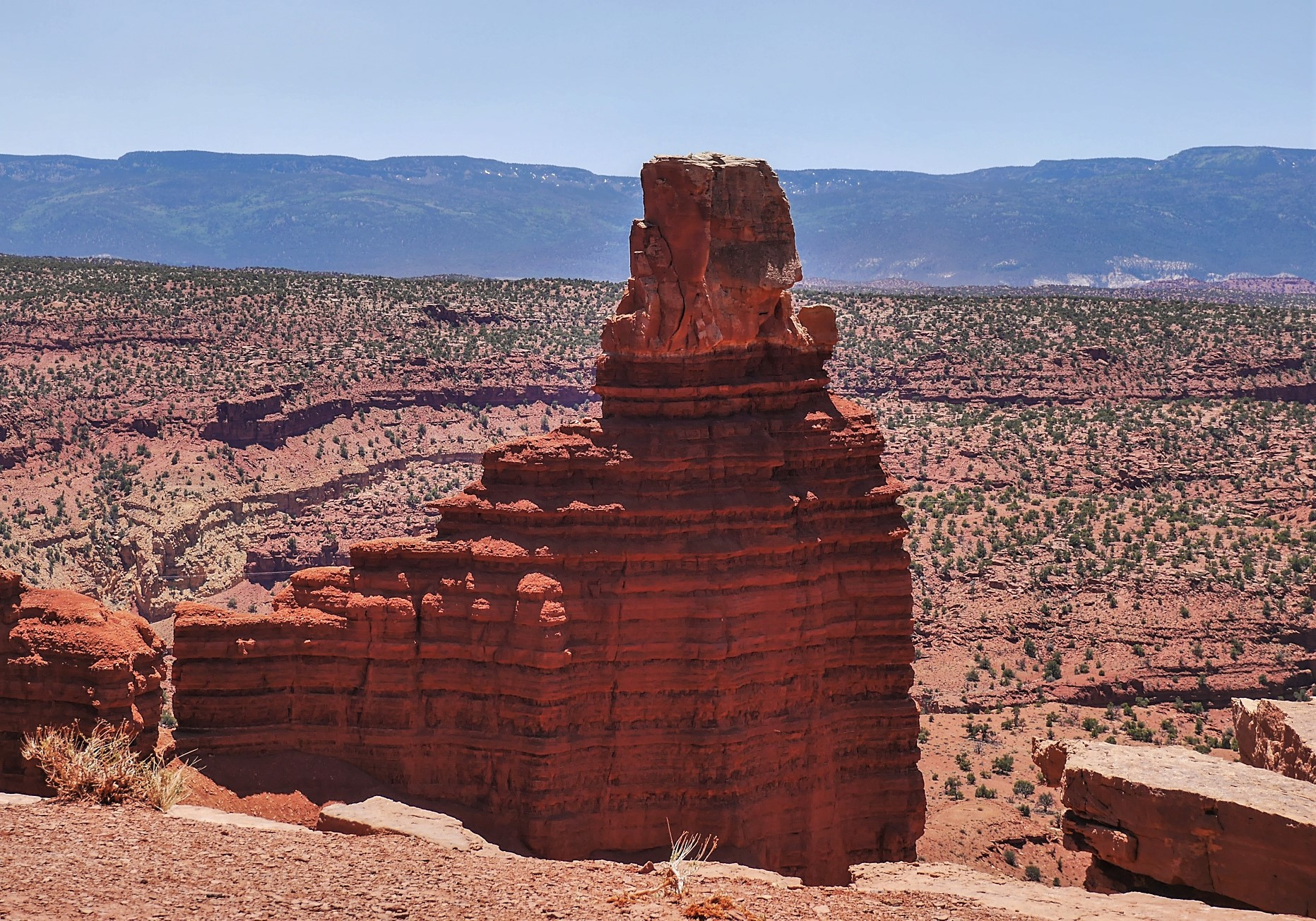

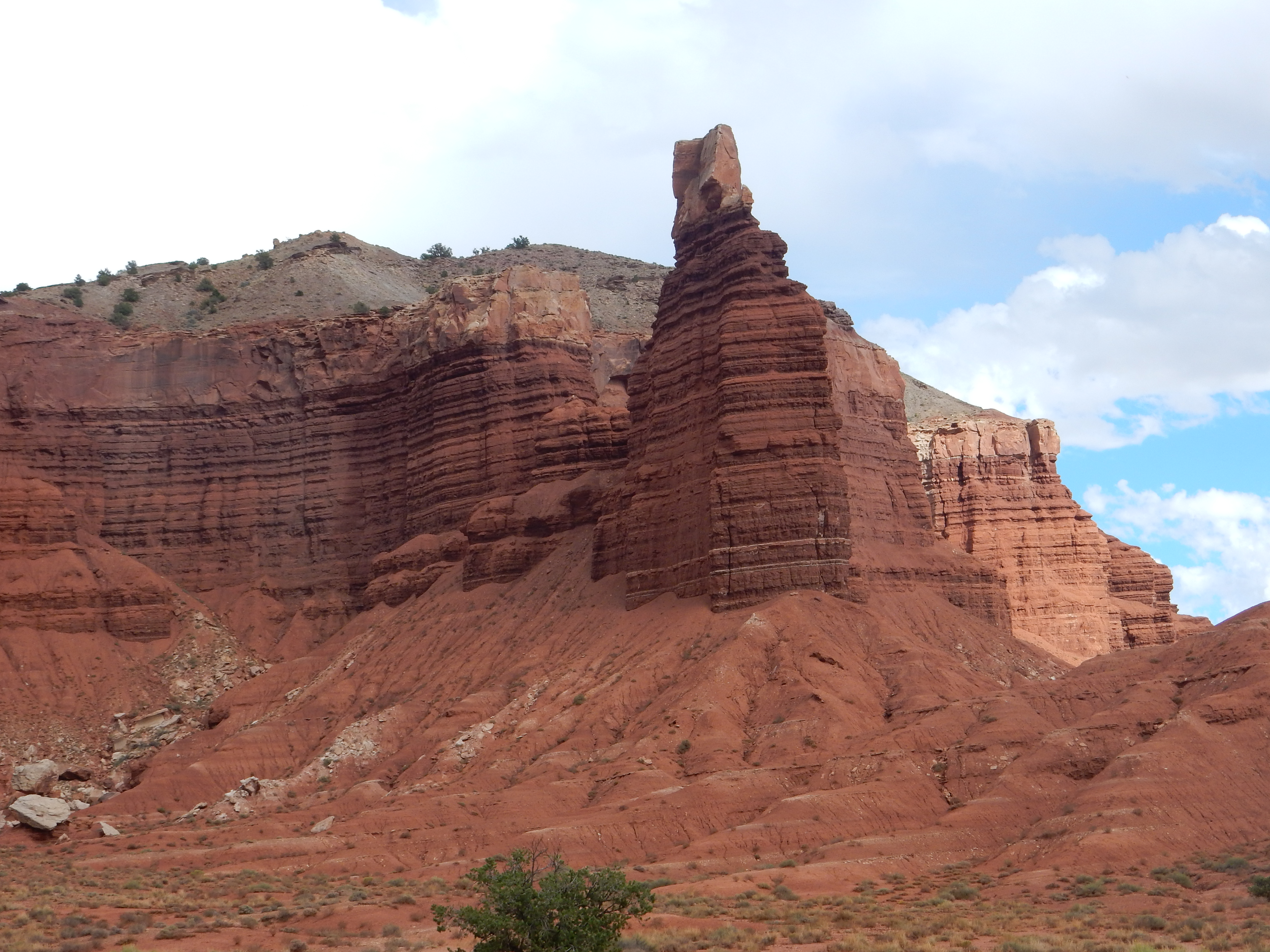
From west

== Climate ==
Spring and fall are the most favorable seasons to visit Chimney Rock. According to the Köppen climate classification system, it is located in a Cold semi-arid climate zone, which is defined by the coldest month having an average mean temperature below 32 °F (0 °C), and at least 50% of the total annual precipitation being received during the spring and summer. This desert climate receives less than 10 inches (250 millimeters) of annual rainfall, and snowfall is generally light during the winter.

Climate data for Capitol Reef Visitor Center, elevation 5,653 ft (1,723 m), 1981-2010 normals, extremes 1981-2019
Month	Jan	Feb	Mar	Apr	May	Jun	Jul	Aug	Sep	Oct	Nov	Dec	Year
Record high °F (°C)	58.6 (14.8)	68.3 (20.2)	78.3 (25.7)	84.4 (29.1)	94.6 (34.8)	100.2 (37.9)	100.8 (38.2)	97.9 (36.6)	95.4 (35.2)	86.1 (30.1)	70.4 (21.3)	61.5 (16.4)	100.8 (38.2)
Mean daily maximum °F (°C)	40.6 (4.8)	46.4 (8.0)	54.7 (12.6)	65.0 (18.3)	74.5 (23.6)	85.3 (29.6)	90.4 (32.4)	87.9 (31.1)	80.2 (26.8)	66.1 (18.9)	51.3 (10.7)	40.6 (4.8)	65.3 (18.5)
Mean daily minimum °F (°C)	17.8 (−7.9)	22.7 (−5.2)	30.2 (−1.0)	36.2 (2.3)	44.7 (7.1)	53.1 (11.7)	60.4 (15.8)	58.5 (14.7)	50.4 (10.2)	39.0 (3.9)	27.6 (−2.4)	18.2 (−7.7)	38.3 (3.5)
Record low °F (°C)	−4.2 (−20.1)	−11.8 (−24.3)	9.1 (−12.7)	18.1 (−7.7)	27.2 (−2.7)	34.6 (1.4)	42.4 (5.8)	45.1 (7.3)	29.9 (−1.2)	11.7 (−11.3)	8.0 (−13.3)	−7.5 (−21.9)	−11.8 (−24.3)
Average precipitation inches (mm)	0.52 (13)	0.34 (8.6)	0.53 (13)	0.47 (12)	0.59 (15)	0.47 (12)	0.91 (23)	1.20 (30)	0.80 (20)	0.98 (25)	0.49 (12)	0.32 (8.1)	7.62 (194)
Average dew point °F (°C)	17.3 (−8.2)	20.8 (−6.2)	23.0 (−5.0)	24.5 (−4.2)	29.1 (−1.6)	32.0 (0.0)	40.0 (4.4)	41.8 (5.4)	34.8 (1.6)	28.2 (−2.1)	21.9 (−5.6)	17.5 (−8.1)	27.6 (−2.4)
Source: PRISM

== See also ==
- Colorado Plateau
- Geology of the Capitol Reef area
