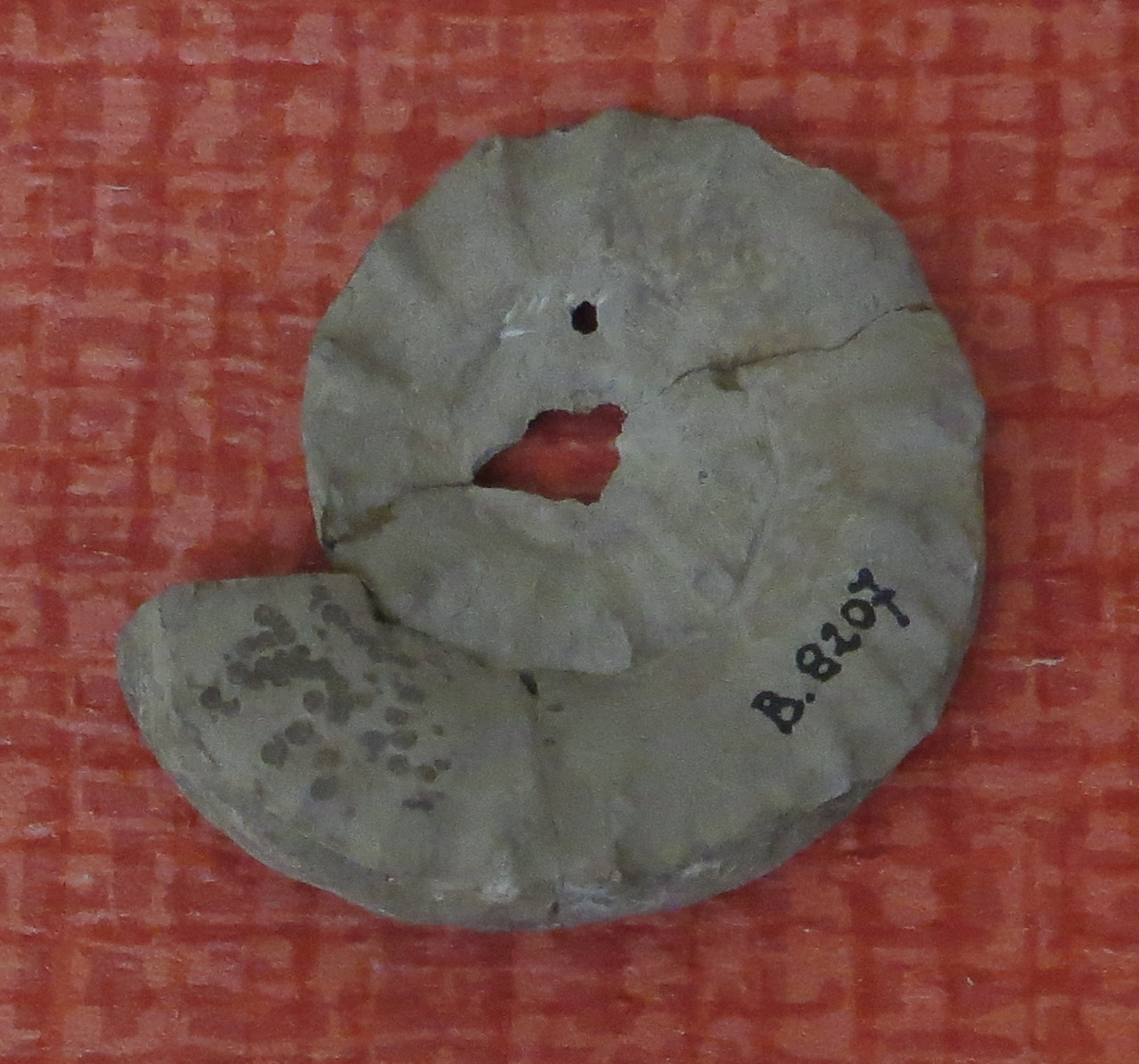
- Tirolites cassianus fossil

Scientific classification
- Kingdom: Animalia
- Phylum: Mollusca
- Class: Cephalopoda
- Subclass: †Ammonoidea
- Order: †Ceratitida
- Family: †Tirolitidae
- Genus: †Tirolites; Mojsisovics, 1879

Species
- Tirolites cassianus Tirolites harti Tirolites haueri Tirolites knighti Tirolites longilobatus Tirolites mangyshlakensis Tirolites peali Tirolites smithi Tirolites ussuriensis

= Tirolites =

Tirolites Temporal range: early Spathian ~250.6 Ma

Extinct genus of ammonites

Tirolites is an extinct genus of ammonoid cephalopod. Its first appearance defines the Smithian-Spathian boundary in the Olenekian stage of the Early Triassic epoch. It is prominent in the Paris biota.
