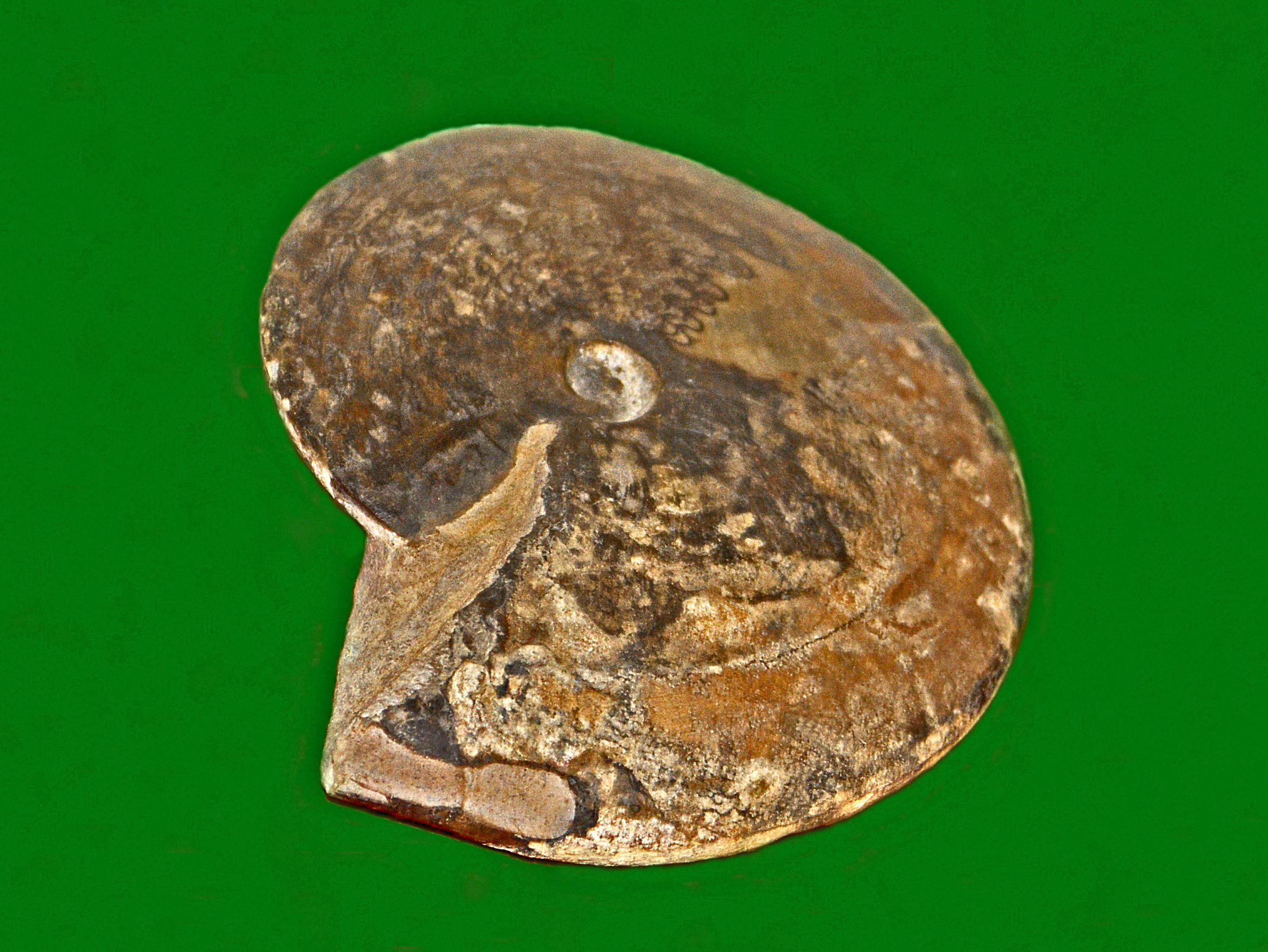
- Fossil shell of Hedenstroemia tscherskii from Madagascar, on display at Galerie de paléontologie et d'anatomie comparée in Paris

Scientific classification
- Kingdom: Animalia
- Phylum: Mollusca
- Class: Cephalopoda
- Subclass: †Ammonoidea
- Order: †Ceratitida
- Superfamily: †Sageceratoidea
- Family: †Hedenstroemiidae; Waagen, 1895

= Hedenstroemiidae =

Hedenstroemiidae Temporal range: Triassic (Olenekian), 252.3–242.0 Ma

Extinct family of molluscs

Hedenstroemiidae is an extinct family of cephalopods in the ammonoid order Ceratitida. They were nektonic carnivores.

== Genera ==
- Clypites Waagen 1895
- Cordillerites Hyatt and Smith 1905
- Hedenstroemia Waagen 1895
- Mesohedenstroemia Chao 1959
- Parahedenstroemia Spath 1934
- Pseudohedenstroemia
- Pseudosageceras Diener 1895
- Tellerites Mojsisovics 1902

== Distribution ==
Fossils of species within this family have been found in the Triassic of Afghanistan, Canada, Oman, Pakistan, Russia and United States.
