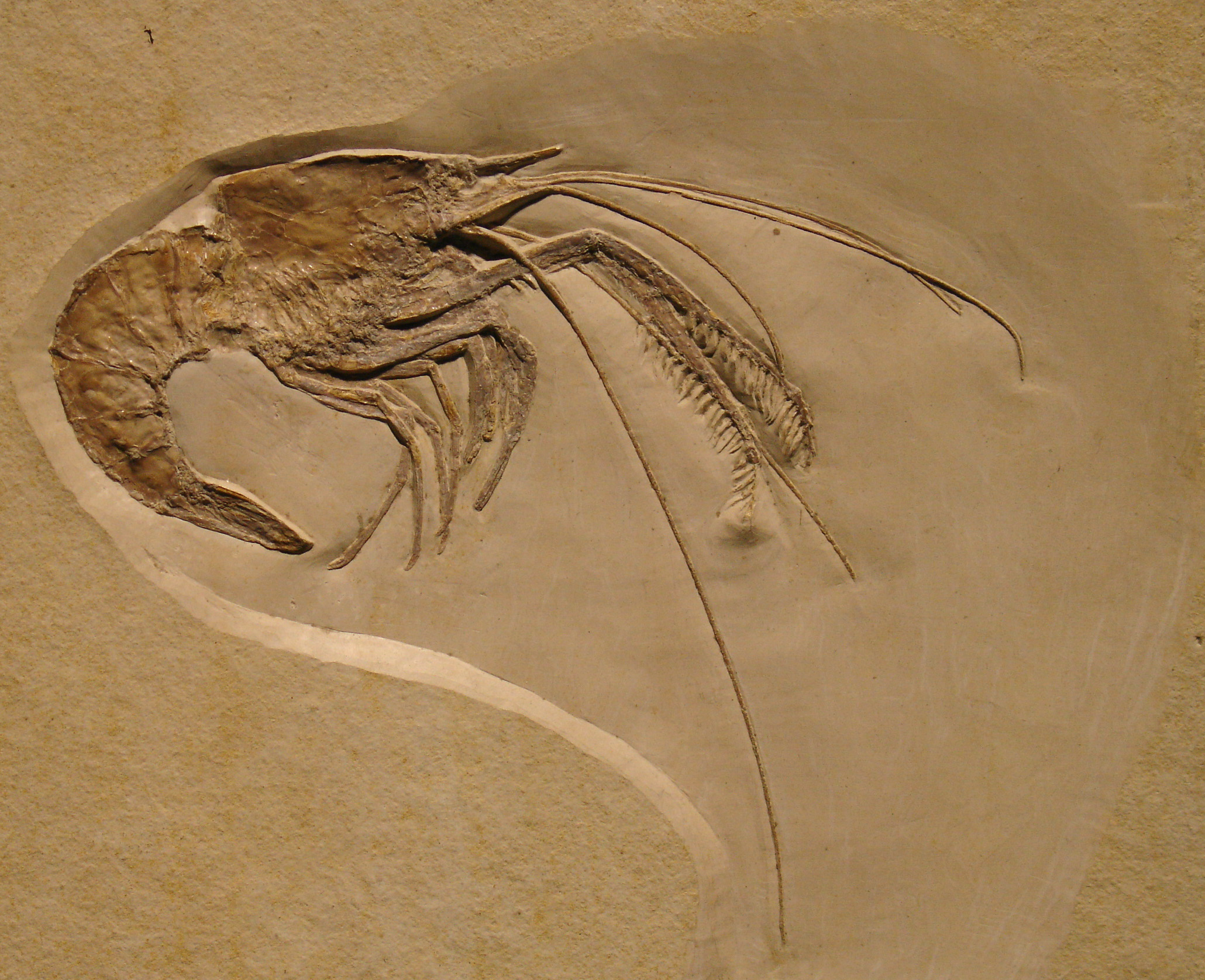
- Aeger elegans

Scientific classification
- Kingdom: Animalia
- Phylum: Arthropoda
- Clade: Pancrustacea
- Class: Malacostraca
- Order: Decapoda
- Suborder: Dendrobranchiata
- Superfamily: Penaeoidea
- Family: †Aegeridae; Burkenroad, 1963

Genera
- †Acanthochirana; †Aeger; †Anisaeger; †Distaeger

= Aegeridae =

Aegeridae Temporal range: Early Triassic–Cretaceous

Extinct family of crustaceans

Aegeridae is a family of fossil prawns, one of the earliest Mesozoic shrimp families. It contains the genera Aeger, Acanthochirana, Anisaeger and Distaeger. The main diagnostic character of Aegeridae is the presence of numerous spines or thin setae on the third maxilliped.

They are known from locations in Europe, Mexico, United States, Middle East and China.

Aegerids such as Anisaeger and Distaeger were found in large numbers of close specimens, suggesting gregarious behaviour. They could have been good swimmers, but the morphology suggests they mostly lived on the sea floor.
