= Chinle Formation =

Geological formation in the western US

- Stratigraphic range: Norian–Rhaetian
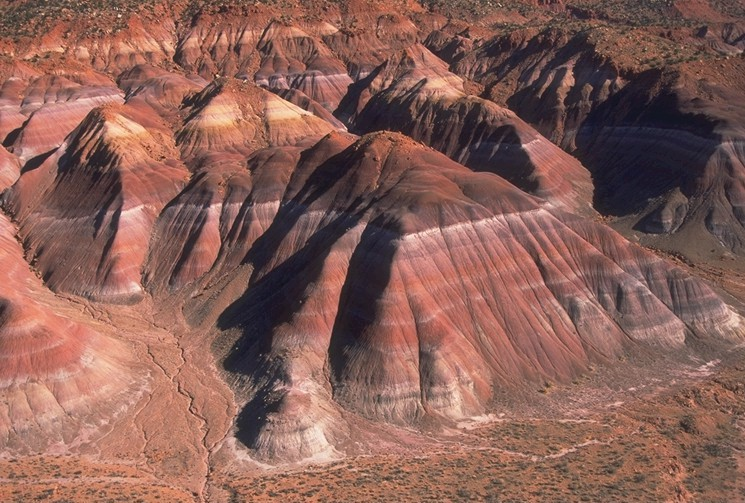
- Chinle Badlands, Grand Staircase–Escalante National Monument, Utah, US.
- Type: Geological formation
- Sub-units: see text
- Underlies: Wingate Sandstone, Moenave Formation, Nugget Sandstone
- Overlies: Moenkopi Formation or Cutler Group

Lithology
- Primary: fluvial mudstone, siltstone, and sandstone
- Other: paleosols

Location
- Coordinates: 36.155°N 109.579°W
- Approximate paleocoordinates: 10.7°N 48.3°W
- Region: Colorado Plateau
- Extent: Utah; Colorado; New Mexico; Arizona; Nevada

Type section
- Named for: Chinle, AZ
- Named by: Herbert E. Gregory
- Chinle Formation (the United States) Chinle Formation (Arizona) Type locality in Arizona

The Chinle Formation is an Upper Triassic continental geological formation of fluvial, lacustrine, and palustrine to eolian deposits spread across the U.S. states of Nevada, Utah, northern Arizona, western New Mexico, and western Colorado. In New Mexico, it is often raised to the status of a geological group, the Chinle Group. Some authors have controversially considered the Chinle to be synonymous to the Dockum Group of eastern Colorado and New Mexico, western Texas, the Oklahoma panhandle, and southwestern Kansas. The Chinle Formation is part of the Colorado Plateau, Basin and Range, and the southern section of the Interior Plains. A probable separate depositional basin within the Chinle is found in northwestern Colorado and northeastern Utah. The southern portion of the Chinle reaches a maximum thickness of a little over 520 meters (1,710 ft). Typically, the Chinle rests unconformably on the Moenkopi Formation.

The Chinle Formation was probably mostly deposited in the Norian stage, according to a plethora of chronological techniques. It is a thick and fossiliferous formation with numerous named members (subunits) throughout its area of deposition.

== History of investigation ==
While colorful Triassic sediments of the Colorado Plateau have been investigated since the 19th century, the Chinle Formation was only formally named and described by Herbert E. Gregory in 1917. It was named for Chinle Valley in Apache County, Arizona, land which is largely within the Navajo Nation. Gregory did not designate a type locality. He split the Chinle into four subunits, labelled A (youngest) to D (oldest). This did not include the underlying Shinarump Conglomerate (named by G. K. Gilbert and Edwin E. Howell in 1875), which he considered a separate formation.

United States Geological Survey geologists and paleontologists continued to map out the Chinle Formation through the 20th century, revising the unnamed subunits of Gregory. A basic stratigraphy of the formation was developed for north-central New Mexico by Wood and Northrop (1946), and stratigraphy in the Four Corners Region was established by the late 1950s. In 1956, Economic geologist Raymond C. Robeck identified and named the Temple Mountain member as the basal-most unit in the area of the San Rafael Swell of Utah. In 1957, John H. Stewart revised the Shinarump Conglomerate and renamed it the Shinarump member of the Chinle formation.

Study of the formation expanded northwards into northern Utah and Colorado, facilitated through papers by Forrest G. Poole and Stewart (1964) and Steve W. Sikich (1965), who named informal local members equivalent to those of Arizona and New Mexico. The complete areal extent of the unit was mapped by R.F. Wilson and Stewart in 1967. Stewart and his colleagues created an expansive overview and revision of the formation in 1972, summarizing previous knowledge on Chinle stratigraphy.

V.C. Kelley assigned more members and revised the unit in 1972. Spencer G. Lucas and S.N. Hayden did the same thing in 1989. The Rock Point Member was assigned by R.F. Dubiel in 1989.

The Chinle was raised to group rank by Lucas in 1993, thus also raising many of the members to formation status. He also included the formations of the Dockum Group of eastern New Mexico and west Texas within the "Chinle Group". This modified nomenclature is controversial; many still retain the Chinle as a formation and separate out the Dockum Group. The Dockum was named in 1890, before the Chinle. Lucas also advocated abandoning the name Dolores Formation as a parochial synonym for the Chinle Group.

Overviews of the Chinle were created by Dubiel and others (1992) and Hintze and Axen (1995).

== Paleobiota ==
The Chinle Formation is fossiliferous, with a diverse array of extinct reptile, fish, and plant fossils, including early dinosaurs and the famous petrified wood of Petrified Forest National Park in Arizona.

== Stratigraphy ==
The formation members and their thicknesses are highly variable across the Chinle.

Regional stratigraphic subunits of the Chinle Formation
Arizona and western New Mexico	North-central New Mexico	Monument Valley and southern Utah	Colorado and northeast Utah
Rock Point Member	"siltstone member" (in part)	Church Rock Member	"upper member" "red siltstone member" "sandstone and conglomerate member" (UT) "ocher siltstone member" (UT)
Owl Rock Member	"siltstone member" (in part)?	Owl Rock Member Kane Springs beds (in part)	"upper member" "red siltstone member" "sandstone and conglomerate member" (UT) "ocher siltstone member" (UT)
Petrified Forest Member sensu stricto / "Upper Petrified Forest" / Painted Desert Member	Petrified Forest Member	Petrified Forest Member Kane Springs beds (in part)	"upper member" "red siltstone member" "sandstone and conglomerate member" (UT) "ocher siltstone member" (UT)
Sonsela Member	Poleo Formation	Moss Back Member	"upper member" "red siltstone member" "sandstone and conglomerate member" (UT) "ocher siltstone member" (UT)
Blue Mesa Member / "Lower Petrified Forest" Bluewater Creek Formation (NM)	Salitral Formation	Monitor Butte Member Cameron Member	"mottled member" Gartra Member?
Mesa Redondo Member Shinarump Conglomerate Zuni Mountains Formation (NM)	Agua Zarca Sandstone / Shinarump Conglomerate "mottled strata"	Shinarump Conglomerate Temple Mountain Member	"mottled member" Gartra Member?

=== Arizona and western New Mexico ===
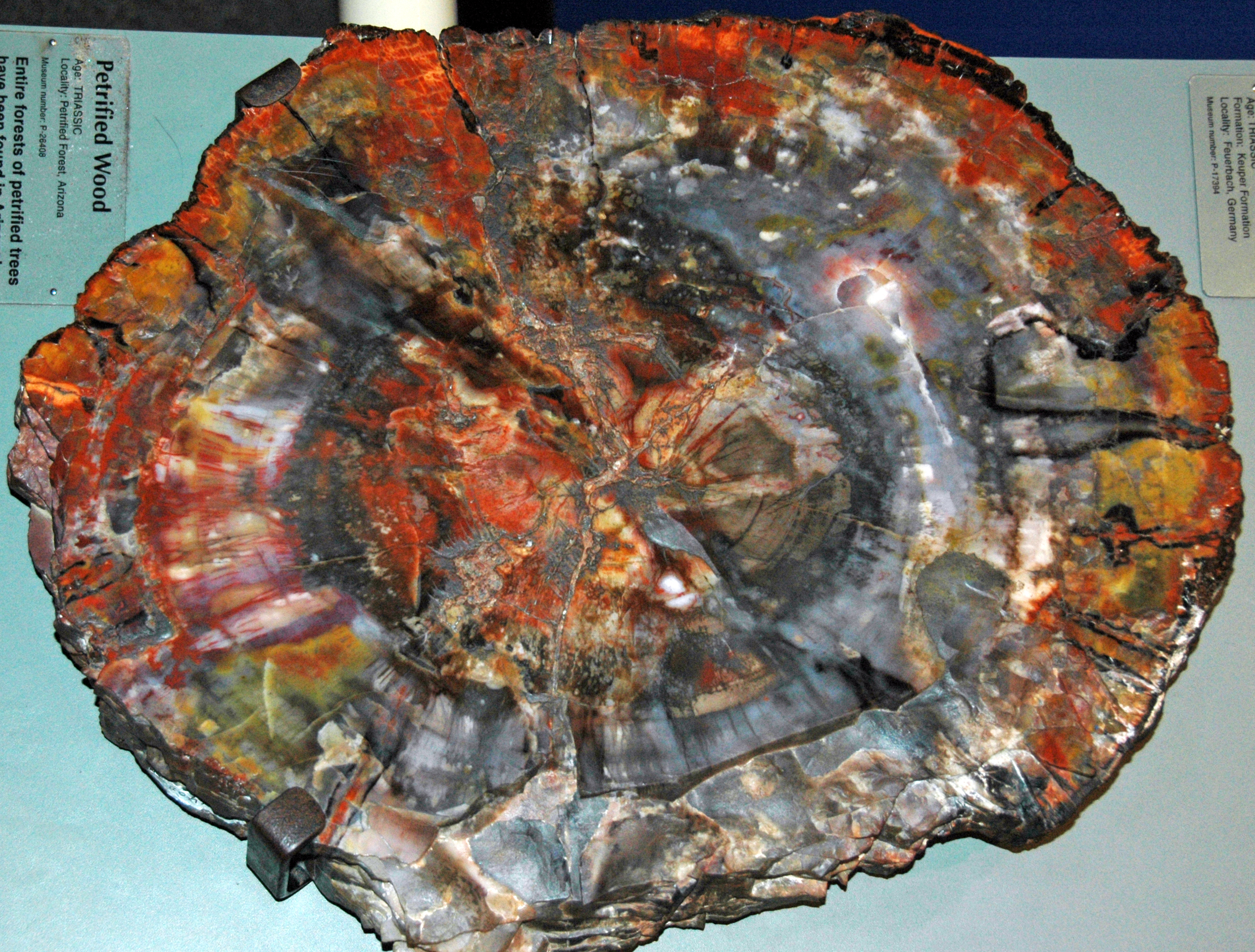
Fossil wood from Chinle Formation exposures at Petrified Forest National Park

Some of the most extensive deposits of the Chinle Formation are found in the southern Colorado Plateau, including Arizona and the western portion of New Mexico. In this region, the oldest and stratigraphically lowest portion of the Chinle is the Shinarump Conglomerate. The Shinarump includes braided-river system channel-deposit facies. The Shinarump interfingers with a finer-grained subunit, the Mesa Redondo Member, one of the oldest widespread units in the badlands of the Painted Desert area. In western New Mexico (particularly the Zuni Mountains area), the Mesa Redondo Member may be replaced by another sandy unit known as the Zuni Mountains Formation. Sediments from this time interval are followed by a geological unit called the Bluewater Creek Formation.

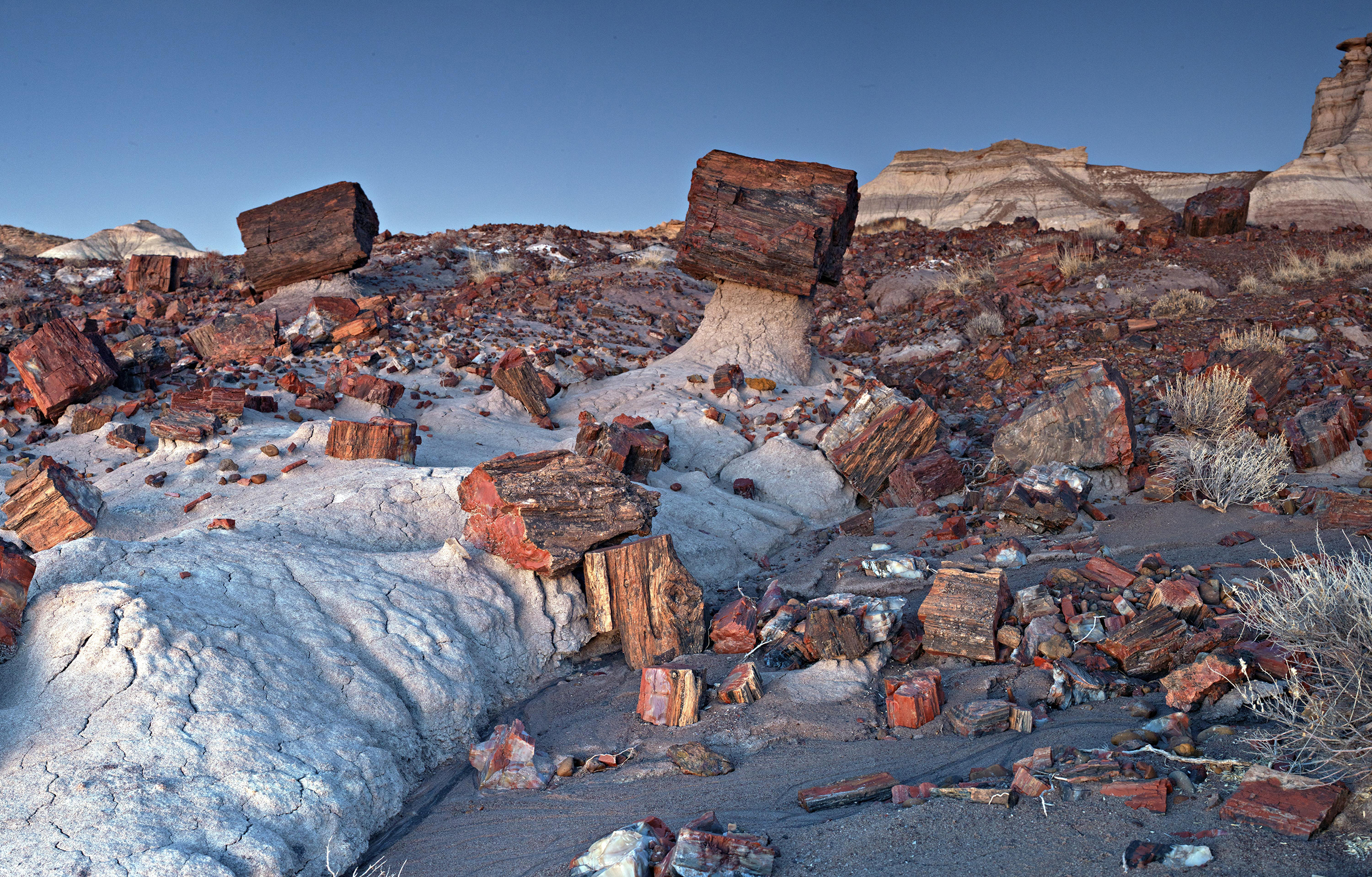
Petrified Forest National Park araucarioxylon fossil wood weathered from the Chinle Formation

Most Chinle outcrops in the Painted Desert have traditionally been placed within the following Petrified Forest Member, a segment of Triassic sediments which are so diverse and extensive that it is sometimes raised to its own formation, subdivided further, or redefined more narrowly. In its widest definition, the Petrified Forest Member (or Formation) is split into three sections: the muddy Lower Petrified Forest and Upper Petrified Forest, and the sandy Sonsela Sandstone bed, which separates them. The Lower "Petrified Forest Member" is generally known as the Blue Mesa Member. In Petrified Forest National Park (PEFO) and its vicinities, the Sonsela Sandstone is thick enough that it can be resolved into several distinct sandstone-rich layers. It is renamed as the Sonsela Member in this situation. The Sonsela Sandstone is a collection of braided-stream channel facies. The Upper "Petrified Forest Member" is sometimes called the Painted Desert Member, or simply referred to as the Petrified Forest Member in a more restricted definition of the term. The Petrified Forest is predominately overbank deposits with thin lenses of channel-deposit facies and lacustrine deposits.

The Petrified Forest Member grades into the Owl Rock Member, a marginal lacustrine to lacustrine facies possibly representing a large lake system. The Owl Rock Member is followed by the youngest and sandiest subunit of the Chinle, the Rock Point Member. The Rock Point is distinct enough that it was previously considered a unit of the Wingate Sandstone, a latest Triassic - early Jurassic aeolian formation which overlies the Chinle in many areas.

=== Central New Mexico ===
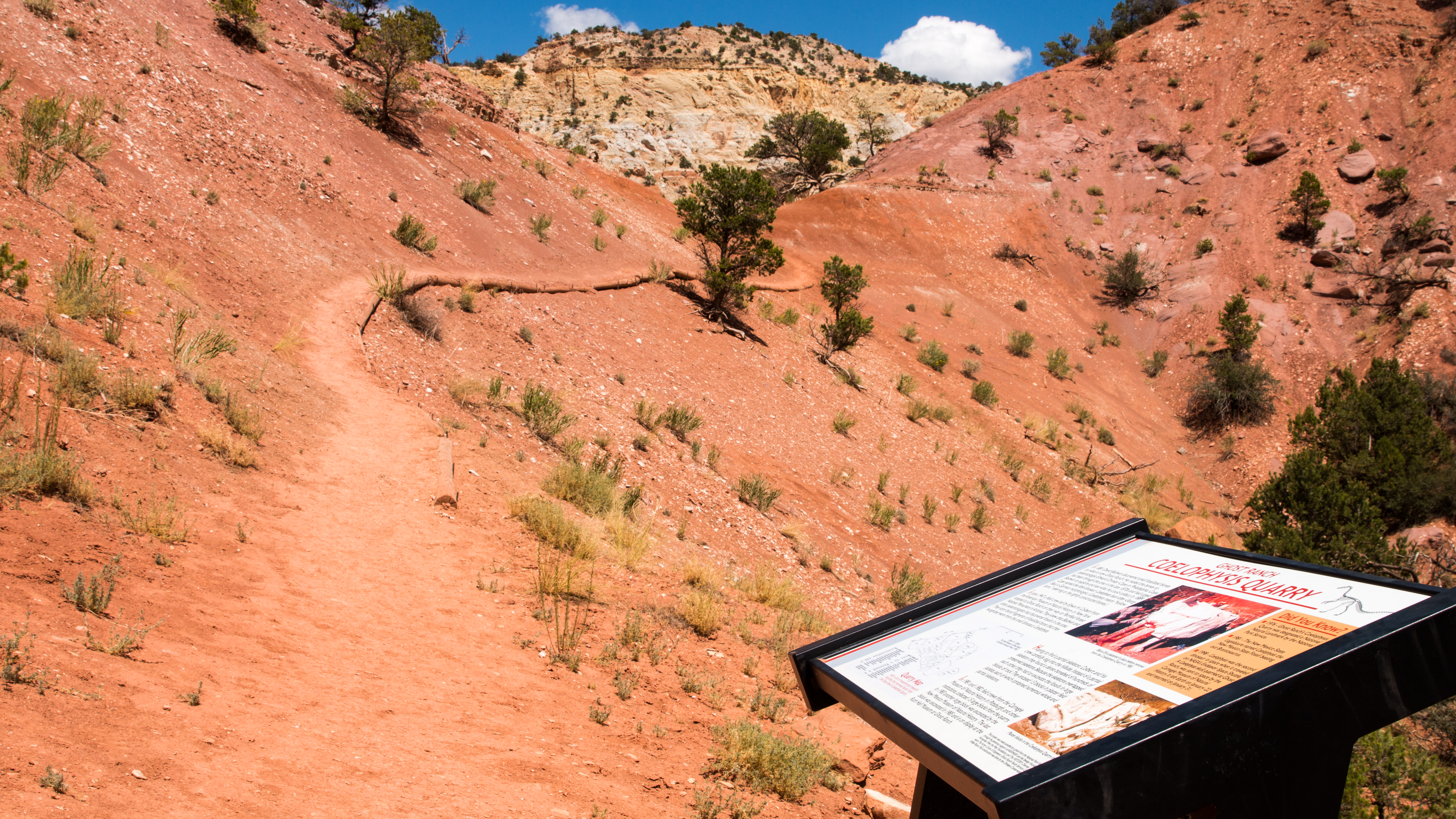
The Whitaker ("Coelophysis") Quarry at Ghost Ranch, preserving the "siltstone member" of the Chinle Formation

Unambiguous exposures of the Chinle Formation extend into central New Mexico, beyond the eastern edge of the Colorado Plateau. Most of these are found in the Chama Basin of north-central New Mexico, particularly several famed paleontological sites at Ghost Ranch near Abiquiu. Minor exposures also occur in the Lucero Uplift west of Albuquerque, as well as other areas along the Rio Grande Rift.

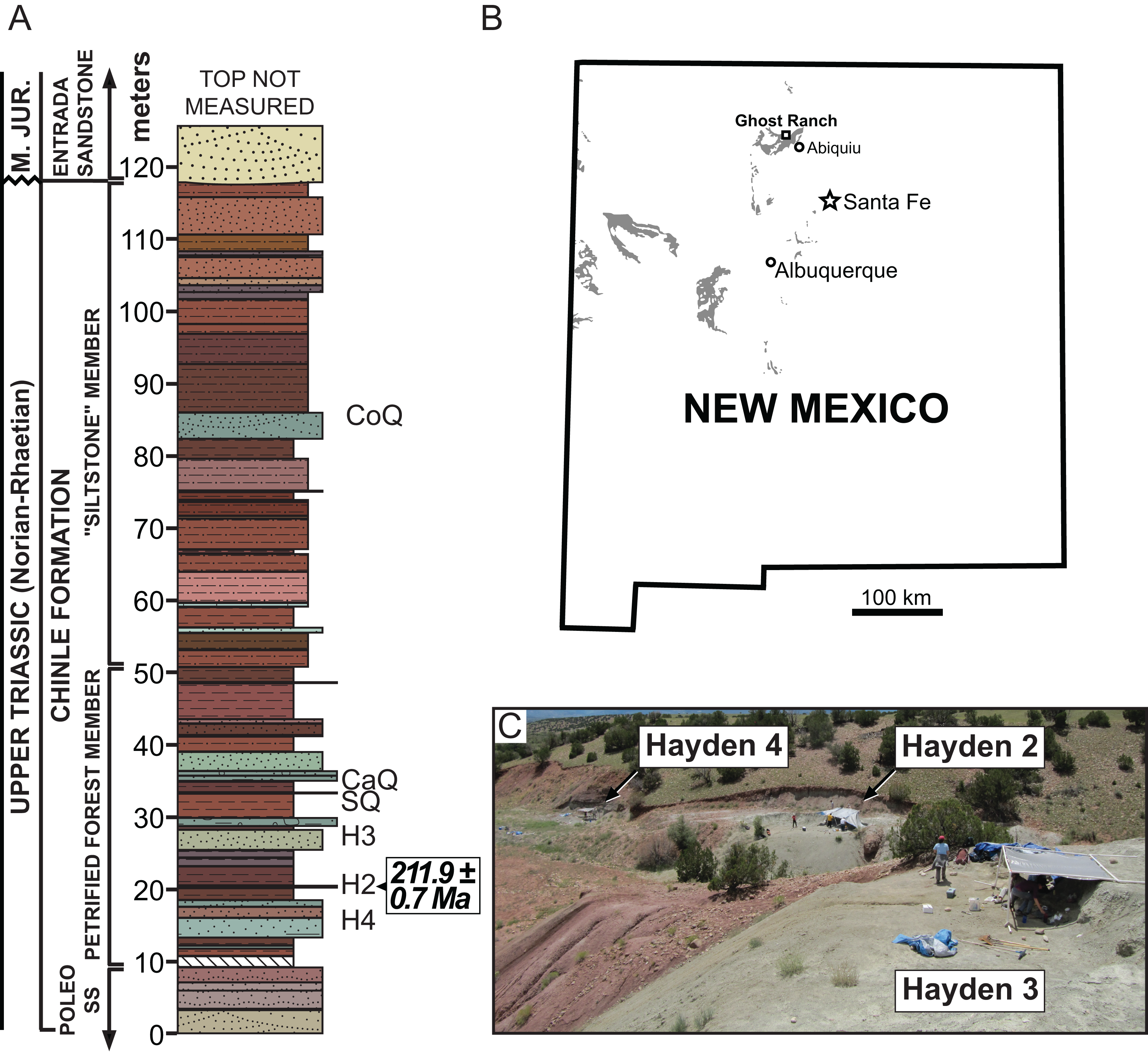
Stratigraphic column (A) and outcrop photos (C) of the Hayden Quarry fossil locality at Ghost Ranch, NM, alongside a map of Chinle exposures in NM (B)

As in the Colorado Plateau, the lowest major unit in north-central New Mexico is a sandstone-rich member. This layer, the Agua Zarca Sandstone, is often synonymized with the Shinarump Conglomerate, though it may be derived from a different erosional source. It is often preceded by a very thin layer of silty mottled strata. This mottled strata is sometimes termed the Zuni Mountains Formation, though the application of this term beyond the Zuni Mountains is questionable. In the Chama Basin at least, the mottled strata is derived from the eroded and pedogenically modified surface of the Moenkopi Formation.

The coarse lower unit grades into the fine-grained Salitral Formation, which is equivalent to the Blue Mesa Member and Bluewater Creek Formation. In south-central New Mexico, it may instead grade into the San Pedro Arroyo Formation, a similar heterolithic unit. Coarse sandstone returns along a sharp contact with the following Poleo Formation, an equivalent of the Sonsela Member. The Poleo Formation grades into the thick colorful sediments of the Petrified Forest Member. Authors which raise this member to a formation subdivide it into the lower Mesa Montosa Member and the upper Painted Desert Member. The Petrified Forest Member is fossiliferous in the Chama Basin, with major sites including the Hayden, Canjilon, and Snyder quarries of Ghost Ranch.

The stratigraphically highest unit in north-central New Mexico is the informally-named "siltstone member". This unit is best exposed at Ghost Ranch, where it has produced the famous Whitaker Quarry, also known as the Coelophysis quarry due to a high concentration of fossils belonging to the theropod dinosaur Coelophysis bauri. The "siltstone member" may be equivalent to the Rock Point Member, and some authors refer to it as such.

=== Monument Valley and southern Utah ===
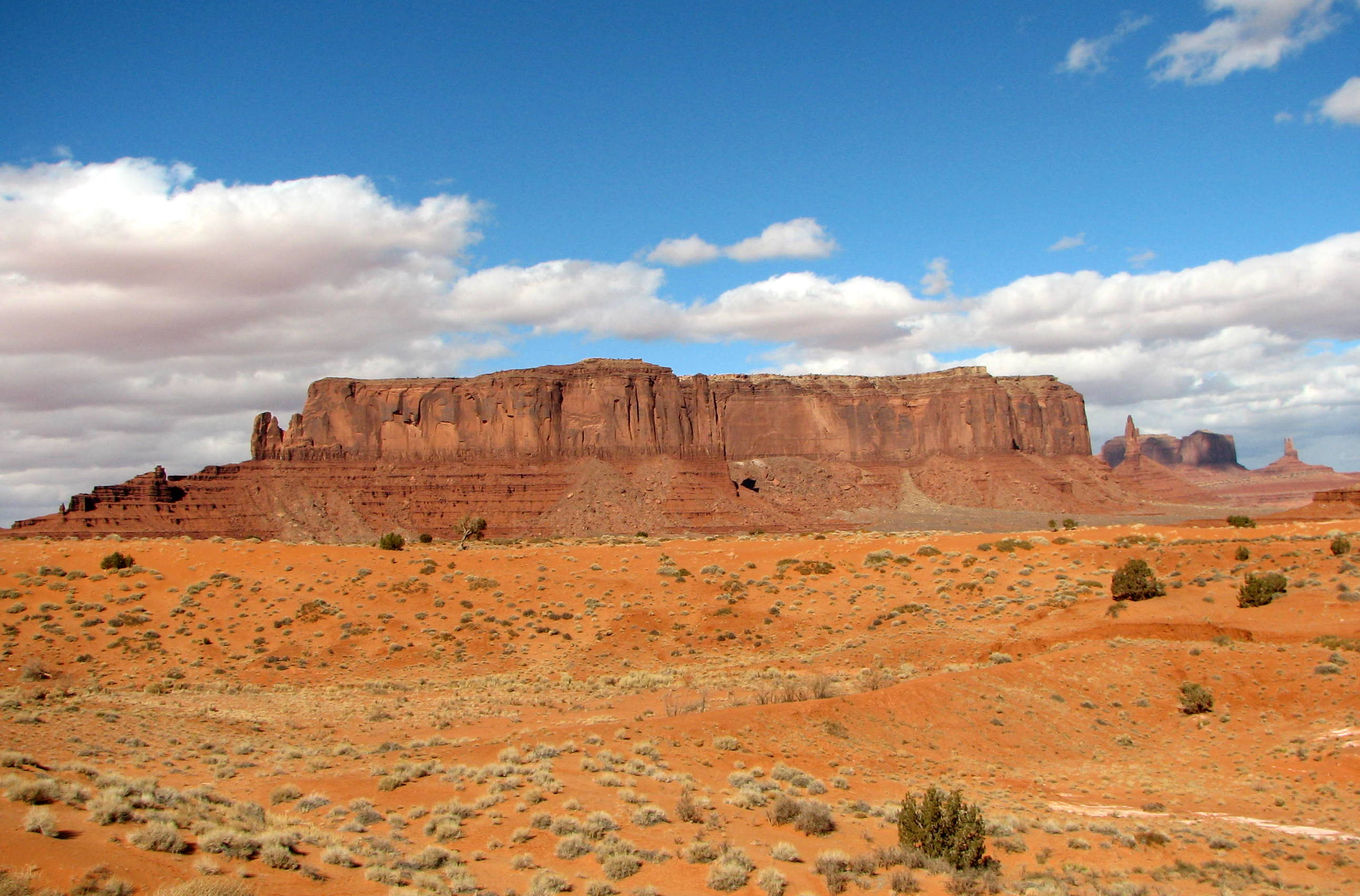
The Shinarump Conglomerate (top, horizontal layers) as an erosion-resistant cap rock in Monument Valley

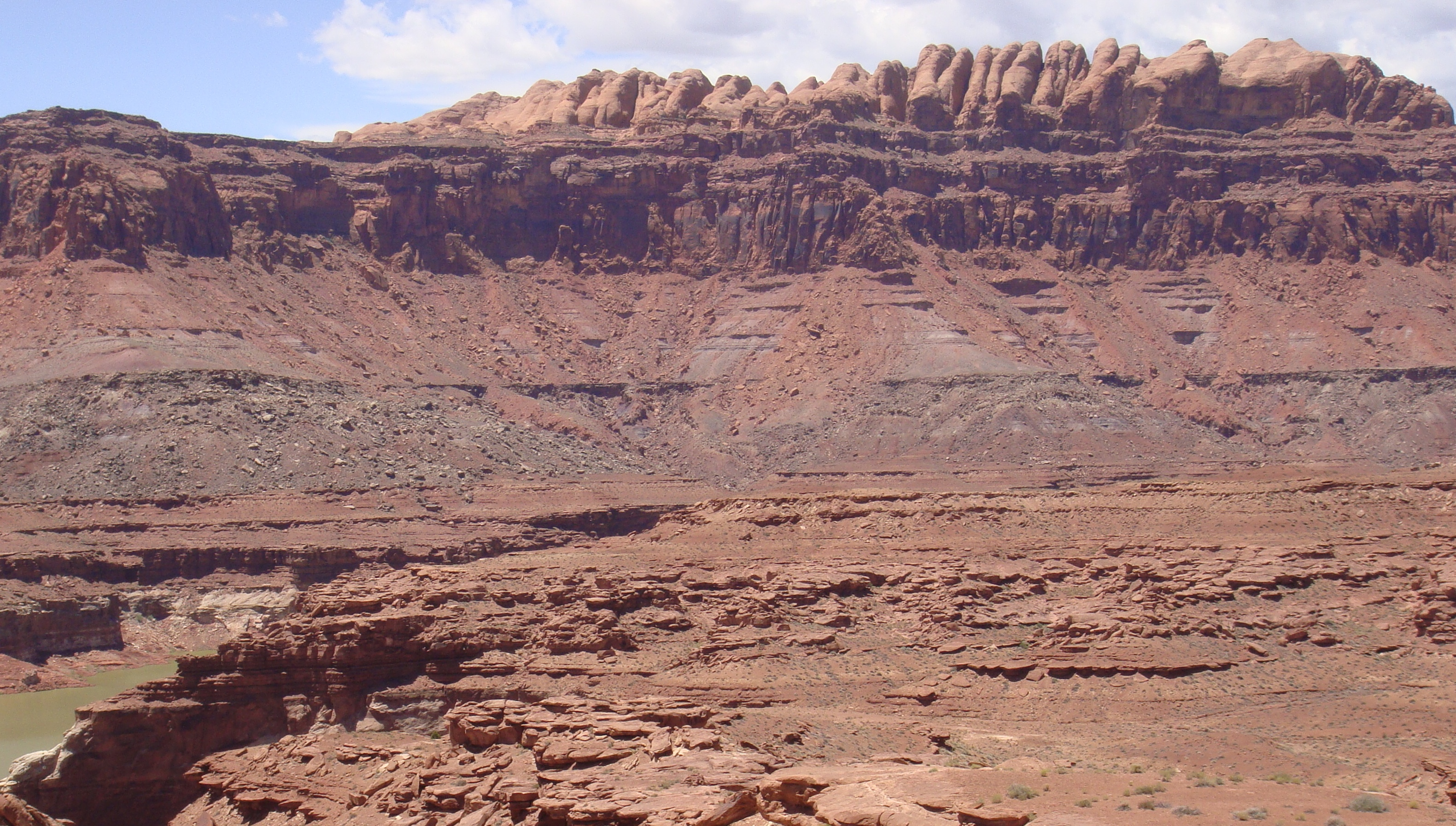
Permian through Jurassic stratigraphy of Glen Canyon National Recreation Area in Utah. From top to bottom: (youngest to oldest) 5 – Rounded tan domes of the Navajo Sandstone, 4 – layered red Kayenta Formation, 3 – cliff-forming, vertically jointed, red Wingate Sandstone, 2 – slope-forming, purplish Chinle Formation, layered, lighter-red Moenkopi Formation 1 – white, layered Cutler Formation sandstone. Picture from Glen Canyon National Recreation Area, Utah

The Chinle continues northwards into southern Utah and the Four Corners area, though it thins greatly to the northwest. A narrow band of undifferentiated purplish sediments from the lower part of the formation extend into vicinity of St. George. The formation thickens eastward into Zion National Park and Grand Staircase–Escalante National Monument. The Chinle is a prominent component of badlands and outcrops in the various national parks, monuments, and recreation areas of southeast Utah, extending in a discontinuous patchwork up to the San Rafael Swell. The stratigraphic nomenclature used in southern Utah is also utilized in Monument Valley, where the coarse-grained lower members of the Chinle form a caprock for many famous buttes which characterize the valley.

In this region, the stratigraphically lowest unit in the Chinle is usually the Shinarump Conglomerate (or Shinarump Member), which thins northward but is a reliable component of outcrops throughout the region. In several areas, a thin layer of mottled paleosols, the Temple Mountain Member, may be superimposed onto the Shinarump and underlying Moenkopi Formation.

The Monitor Butte Member overlies the Shinarump and Temple Mountain members in southeast Utah and Monument Valley. This unit comprises drab and generally fine-grained sediments, equivalent to the Blue Mesa Member and Bluewater Creek Formation found further south. The facies of this interval have been interpreted as overbank (distal floodplain) and lacustrine deposits. At Zion National Park, the Monitor Butte Member is replaced by a thick time-equivalent unit, the Cameron Member, which is also found in the Navajo Nation near its namesake of Cameron, Arizona. The Cameron Member is practically identical to the Blue Mesa Member, and likely represents the same depositional environment along the ancient river system responsible for the Chinle Formation. It is also distinct from the Monitor Butte Member, which has more evaporite deposits and fewer red sandy layers.

The drab mudstone of the Monitor Butte and Cameron members are succeeded in a few areas by a thin section of massive conglomeratic sandstone, the Moss Back Member. This member represents sandy river channel deposits and is likely equivalent to part of the Sonsela Member. Elsewhere, the Monitor Butte grades into the Petrified Forest Member, which in Utah includes the thin but geographically extensive Correo Sandstone Bed. The Petrified Forest Member is followed by the Owl Rock Member. A unit of drab interbedded coarse and fine sediments, the Kane Springs beds, develops in the Paradox Basin. The Kane Springs beds are river deposits which are likely equivalent to the Owl Rock Member and the upper part of the Petrified Forest Member. Finally, either the Rock Point Member or Church Rock Member overlie the Owl Rock. Some researchers feel that the Church Rock and Rock Point members may be synonymous. They are complex heterolithic units, representing variously braided-river facies, lacustrine, and overbank deposits.

== Chronology ==
=== Tetrapod biostratigraphy ===
The Chinle Formation is entirely Late Triassic in age. Tetrapod biostratigraphy for the Chinle was first developed based on phytosaurs and aetosaurs, which in 1998 were combined into global biozones in Spencer G. Lucas's Land Vertebrate Faunachrons system. Simplified stratigraphy based on Litwin. Note that age inferences devised by Lucas do not necessarily align with other chronological methods used in the Chinle Formation. Other works on Chinle biostratigraphy, such as Martz & Parker (2017), are better integrated with magnetostratigraphy and radiometric dating, and are considered more accurate.

Faunachron name	Distinguishing taxa	Estimated age according to radiometric dating and magnetostratigraphy	Inferred age based on Lucas's global tetrapod correlations	Representative Chinle Member(s)
Apachean	Redondasaurus	Rhaetian (207–202 Ma)	late Norian – Rhaetian	Rock Point / Church Rock; "siltstone member"; Owl Rock (in part)?
Revueltian	Typothorax coccinarum, Machaeroprosopus	middle to late Norian (Alaunian to Sevatian, 215–207 Ma)	early to middle Norian	Owl Rock (in part)?; Kane Springs Beds?; Petrified Forest ("Upper Petrified Forest" / Painted Desert); Sonsela (in part)
Adamanian	Basal leptosuchomorph phytosaurs (Smilosuchus, Leptosuchus, etc.)	early to middle Norian (Lacian to early Alaunian, 224–215 Ma)	upper Late Carnian	Sonsela (in part); Blue Mesa ("Lower Petrified Forest"); Moss Back; Monitor Butte; Cameron (in part)
Otischalkian	Basal phytosaurs (Paleorhinus / Parasuchus)	earliest Norian (earliest Lacian, 227–224 Ma)	lower Late Carnian	Cameron (in part); Mesa Redondo; Shinarump; Temple Mountain

=== Radiometric dating ===
Since 2011, widespread radiometric dating has helped to refine precise age data for part of the Chinle Formation, particularly in areas with a more complete stratigraphic record such as Petrified Forest National Park (PEFO). Volcanism further southwest along the Cordilleran magmatic arc supplies zircon crystals to the Chinle system, allowing for U-Pb dating of layers which host zircon grains. Eroded sediments from the Ancestral Rocky Mountains, Ouachita Mountains and Mogollon Highlands also supply older reworked zircon to the basin.

Chinle radiometric dating is complicated by lithological quirks of zircon deposition. Taken at face value, U-Pb dates from coarse-grained layers are often several million years older than expected based on magnetostratigraphy, while mud-dominated layers are generally more accurate despite a lower sample size. This is likely because sandy rivers receive a higher proportion of recycled zircon grains from distant eroded rocks, while muddy plains are supplied with fresh zircon-rich ash from contemporary volcanic eruptions. While zircons from sandstone-rich layers are less useful for inferring direct depositional ages, they can be very useful for inferring sediment sources: each igneous or metamorphic sediment source has its own set of old (usually Precambrian) zircon ages, which can be traced in Triassic sediments.

Outcrops of the Mesa Redondo Member at PEFO have been dated to ~225 Ma (2011) or ~228 Ma (2013), though these may be influenced by recycled grains. Later estimates from a major core drilling project support a more recent depositional age of 223–222 Ma (2020). This firmly suggests that practically all of the Chinle Formation was deposited in the Norian stage; According to the consensus "long Norian" hypothesis and radiometric assessments of marine strata, the Carnian-Norian boundary is tentatively set to ~227 Ma.

At PEFO, U-Pb estimates from the Blue Mesa Member include 223 Ma (2011), 222 Ma (2020), and 221–218 Ma (2020). Dated outcrops of drab mudstone near St. Johns, Arizona fit this general time period as well. The fossiliferous Placerias quarry, previously regarded as belonging to an older subunit, is likely part of the Blue Mesa Member based on an age date of 219.4 Ma (2014). At Six Mile Canyon near Fort Wingate, New Mexico, the base of the Blue Mesa Member (or its local equivalent) is defined by a distinct sandstone bed, which has been dated to 221–219 Ma (2009) or 218 Ma (2011). The underlying Bluewater Creek Formation has also been dated to 221–219 Ma (2014), suggesting that it overlaps in time with the Arizonan Blue Mesa Member and possibly part of the Sonsela Member.

Radiometric dates are well-recorded for the Sonsela Member, though a high concentration of reworked zircons must be accounted for when inferring an accurate age of deposition. The true duration of the Sonsela Member is likely from around 218 Ma to 213 Ma (2020), though older estimates place its base at 220–219 Ma (2011, 2013). A prominent biological turnover is found at the Adamanian-Revueltian boundary in the middle of the Sonsela Member, around 214 Ma. It may correspond to a local extinction, or simply represents a time period which is truncated by slow deposition or a geological hiatus. The thin Sonsela Sandstone bed, the namesake of its corresponding member, has been dated to 216.6 Ma (2019) at its type locality at Sonsela Buttes in Arizona.

The first Chinle U-Pb age data to be published referred to the Black Forest Bed, a sandstone layer near the top of the Petrified Forest Member in PEFO. U-Pb estimates for this layer include ~213 Ma (2003 maximum), ~211 Ma (2009), and ~210 Ma (2011, 2020). A presumably older exposure of the Petrified Forest Member, the Hayden Quarry at Ghost Ranch, is dated to 212 Ma (2011). A similar age was found for the middle part of the member in PEFO. The end of the Petrified Forest Member was probably close to 208 Ma, meaning that overlying strata is presumably latest Norian-Rhaetian in age.

== Places found ==
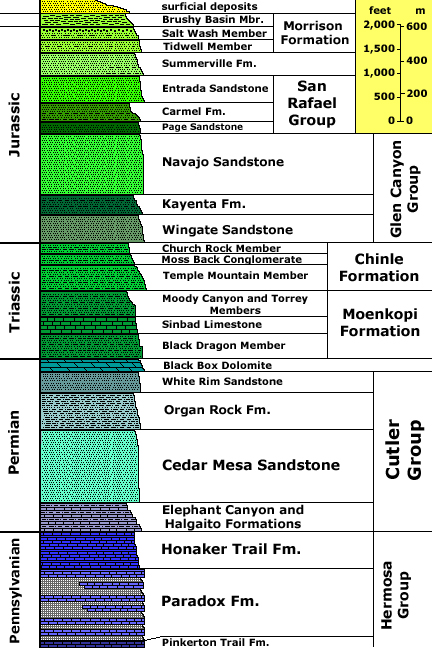
Stratigraphy of Canyonlands N.P., with members of the Chinle Formation

Geologic Province:

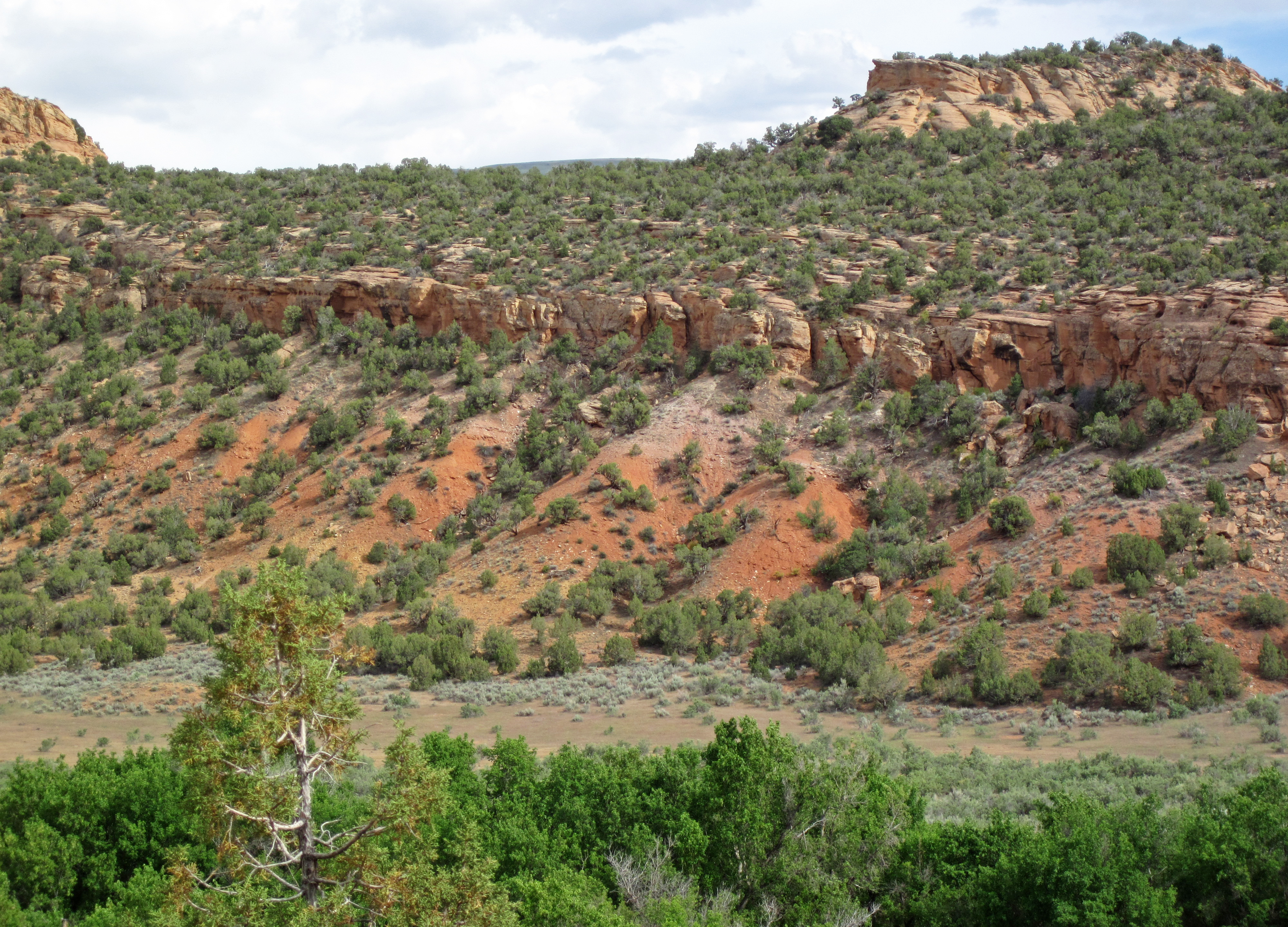
Glen Canyon Sandstone over Chinle Formation (Dinosaur National Monument, Utah)

- Black Mesa Basin*

Rock Point Member
Owl Rock Member
Petrified Forest Member
Mesa Redondo Member
Shinarump Member

- Great Basin province*

Petrified Forest Member
Shinarump Member

- Green River Basin*

upper member
red siltstone member (possibly correlative with Church Rock Member)
local sandstone and conglomerate member
ochre siltstone member
mottled member
Gartra Member

- Las Vegas-Raton Basin* (disputed)

Redonda Formation
Bull Canyon Formation
Trujillo Formation
Garita Creek Formation

- Orogrande Basin

San Pedro Arroyo Formation
Shinarump Formation

- Palo Duro Basin* (undivided)
- Paradox Basin*

Church Rock Member
Owl Rock Member
Petrified Forest Member
Moss Back Member
Monitor Butte Member
Shinarump Conglomerate

- Permian Basin (undivided)
- Piceance Basin*

upper member
red siltstone member (possibly correlative with Church Rock Member)
local sandstone and conglomerate member
ochre siltstone member
mottled member
Gartra Member

- Plateau Sedimentary Province*

Rock Point Member
Owl Rock Member
Petrified Forest Member
Mesa Redondo Member
Shinarump Member

- San Juan Basin*

Rock Point Formation
Owl Rock Formation
Petrified Forest Formation
Bluewater Creek/San Pedro Arroyo Formations
Shinarump Conglomerate/Zuni Mountains Formation

- Sierra Grande Uplift* (undivided)
- Uinta Basin*

Stanaker Member
Gartra Member

- Uinta Uplift*

Stanaker Member
Gartra Member

- Wasatch Uplift*

Parklands:

- Arches National Park
- Canyonlands National Park – see geology of the Canyonlands area
- Capitol Reef National Park – see geology of the Capitol Reef area
- Colorado National Monument
- Dinosaur National Monument
- Flaming Gorge National Recreation Area
- Glen Canyon National Recreation Area
- Gold Butte National Monument
- Grand Canyon National Park – see geology of the Grand Canyon
- Grand Staircase–Escalante National Monument
- Lake Mead National Recreation Area
- Natural Bridges National Monument
- Petrified Forest National Park
- Red Fleet State Park
- Wupatki National Monument
- Zion National Park – see geology of the Zion and Kolob canyons area
- Red Rock Canyon National Conservation Area

Other:

- Ghost Ranch

== See also ==
- List of dinosaur-bearing rock formations
- Paleobiota of the Chinle Formation
- Triassic land vertebrate faunachrons
