= Bluewater Creek Formation =

Geologic formation in west-central New Mexico

- Stratigraphic range: Carnian–Norian
- Type: Formation
- Unit of: Chinle Group
- Underlies: Petrified Forest Formation
- Overlies: Shinarump Conglomerate
- Thickness: 100 meters (330 ft)

Lithology
- Primary: Sandstone, mudstone
- Other: Siltstone

Location
- Coordinates: 35.316381°N 108.059074°W
- Region: New Mexico
- Country: United States

Type section
- Named for: Bluewater Creek
- Named by: Lucas and Hayden
- Year defined: 1989
- Bluewater Creek Formation (the United States) Bluewater Creek Formation (New Mexico)

The Bluewater Creek Formation is a geologic formation in west-central New Mexico. It preserves fossils dating back to the late Triassic period.

== Description ==
The formation consists of red sandstones and mudstones and has a total thickness in excess of 100 meters (330 ft). It conformably overlies the Shinarump Conglomerate and conformably underlies the Petrified Forest Formation.

The formation has been correlated with the Salitral Formation of north-central New Mexico on the basis of its lithology, but it is likely somewhat younger, with an age around 219 million years.

== Fossils ==
The formation contains some fossil vertebrates and an extensive fossil flora. Fossil tetrapods from the Bluewater Creek Formation include the theropod dinosaur Camposaurus, phytosaur Rutiodon, the aetosaurs Desmatosuchus and Stagonolepis, and the metoposaurid Anaschisma. These are characteristic of the late Carnian.

== History of investigation ==
Spencer G. Lucas and S.N. Hayden defined the Bluewater Creek Member of the Chinle Formation in 1989, assigning to it beds formerly assigned either to Division D, lower red member, or Monitor Butte Member of the Chinle Formation. With their subsequent promotion of the Chinle in northwestern New Mexico to group rank, the Bluewater Creek was promoted to the Bluewater Creek Formation.

On the basis of high-precision detrital zircon geochronology, Ramezani, Fastovsky, and Bowring concluded in 2014 that the Bluewater Creek beds are correlative with the uppermost Blue Mesa Member to middle Sonsela Member of the Chinle Formation of the Petrified Forest National Park in Arizona, and recommended that the formation be abandoned.

== See also ==
- List of fossiliferous stratigraphic units in New Mexico
- Paleontology in New Mexico
