= Holder Formation =

- Stratigraphic range: Gzhelian
- Type: Formation
- Underlies: Bursum Formation
- Overlies: Beeman Formation
- Thickness: 850 ft (260 m)

Lithology
- Primary: Limestone
- Other: Shale

Location
- Coordinates: 32.822°N 105.874°W
- Region: New Mexico
- Country: United States

Type section
- Named for: Holder Ridge
- Named by: L.C. Pray
- Year defined: 1954
- Holder Formation (the United States) Holder Formation (New Mexico)

The Holder Formation is a geologic formation in the Sacramento Mountains of New Mexico. It preserves fossils dating back to the late Pennsylvanian.

== Description ==
The Holder Formation consists of limestone, red and gray calcareous shale, sandstone, and conglomerate. The maximum thickness is 850 ft (260 m). The formation overlies the Beeman Formation and is overlain by the Laborcita Formation.

The formation is interpreted as a shallow-shelf marine formation of Virgilian (latest Pennsylvanian) age during a global ice age.

== Fossils ==
Bioherms are present at the base of the formation. These are up to 50–75 feet (15–23 meters) thick. They are composed of uncalcified cup-shaped phylloid (leaf-like) algae surrounded by masses of beresellid algae.

== History of investigation ==
The unit was first named by Lloyd C. Pray in 1954 and a type section was designated in 1959. Pray originally assigned the formation to the Magdalena Group, but the Magdalena Group has subsequently been abandoned.

== See also ==
- List of fossiliferous stratigraphic units in New Mexico
- Paleontology in New Mexico
