= Rock Point Formation =

Geologic formation in the United States

- Stratigraphic range: late Triassic
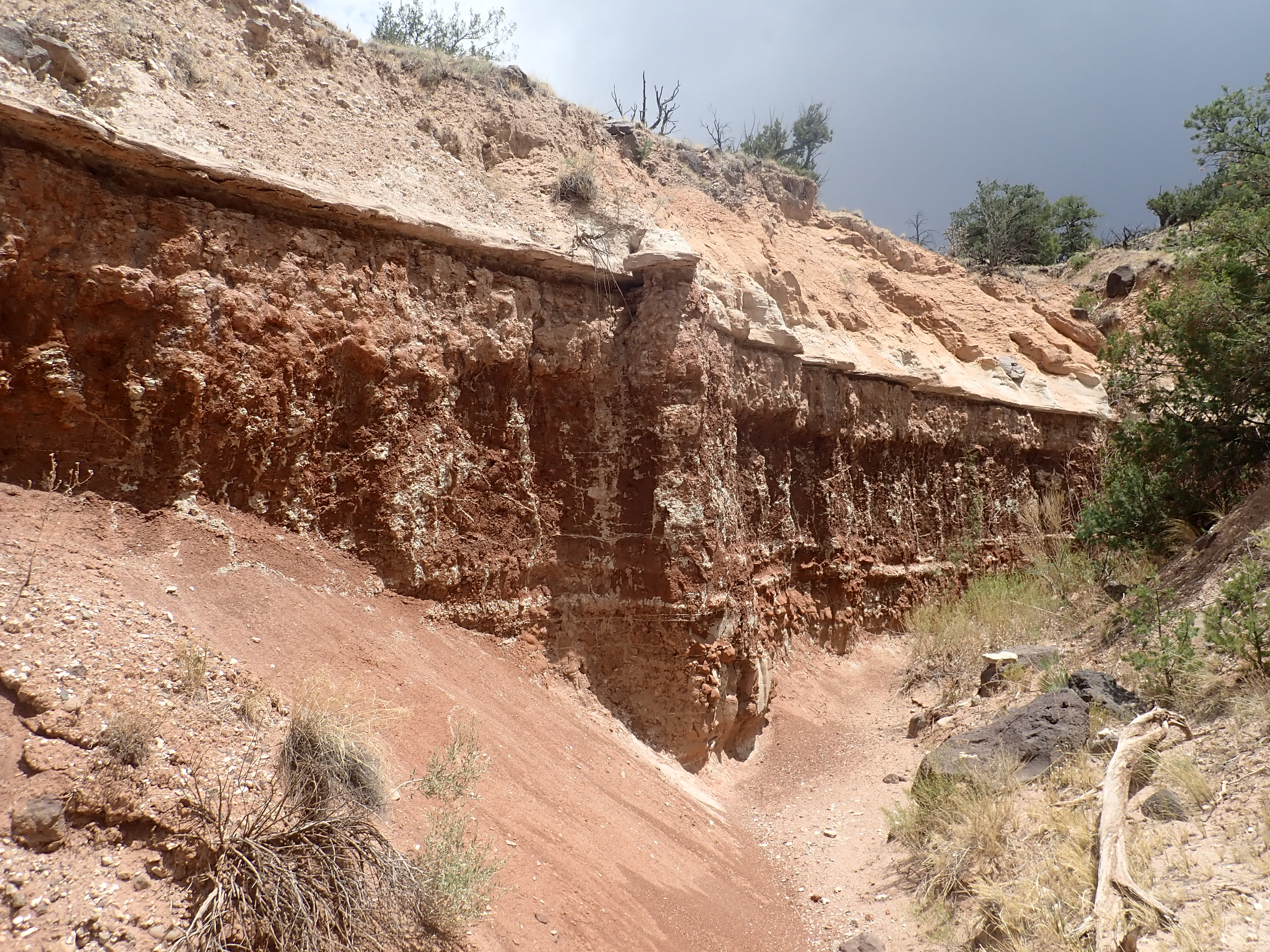
- Rock Point Formation capped by Entrada Formation, near Youngsville, New Mexico
- Type: Formation
- Unit of: Chinle Group
- Underlies: Wingate Sandstone
- Overlies: Petrified Forest Formation
- Thickness: 70 m

Lithology
- Primary: Siltstone
- Other: Fine sandstone

Location
- Coordinates: 36.5247221°N 109.5560845°W
- Region: Utah, Arizona, New Mexico
- Country: United States

Type section
- Named for: Rock Point School, Apache County, Arizona
- Named by: Harshbarger, J.W., Repenning, C.A., and Irwin, J.H., 1957
- Rock Point Formation (the United States) Rock Point Formation (Arizona)

The Rock Point Formation is a geologic formation in New Mexico, Arizona, and Utah. It preserves fossils dating back to the late Triassic.

== Description ==
The formation is up to 70 m thick and is mostly reddish-brown and grayish-red massive siltstone and fine sandstone beds. It is the uppermost portion of the Chinle Group wherever it is exposed. In the Chama basin, its base is placed at the first persistent sandstone bed above the mudstones of the Petrified Forest Formation. Its contact with the overlying Entrada Sandstone is sharp.

== Fossils ==
The Whitaker quarry of Ghost Ranch, New Mexico is believed to be located in the Rock Point Formation, although these beds have also controversially been assigned to the Owl Rock Formation. This quarry has also been referred to as the Coelophysis quarry due to preserving a large number of specimens of the early theropod dinosaur Coelophysis bauri.

== History of investigation ==
The unit was first named by J.W. Harshbarger, C.A. Repenning, and J.H. Irwin in 1957, who assigned Herbert E. Gregory's (1917) "A" division of the Chinle Formation to the Wingate Formation as the Rock Point Member. It was named for Rock Point School, located near the type exposures at Little Round Rock. J.H. Stewart and coinvestigators argued in 1972 that the unit has more affinity with the Chinle, and R.F. Dubiel assigned the Rock Point to the Chinle in 1989. The unit has created an unusual amount of controversy, but Spencer G. Lucas and coinvestigators raised it to formation rank within the Chinle Group in 2005.

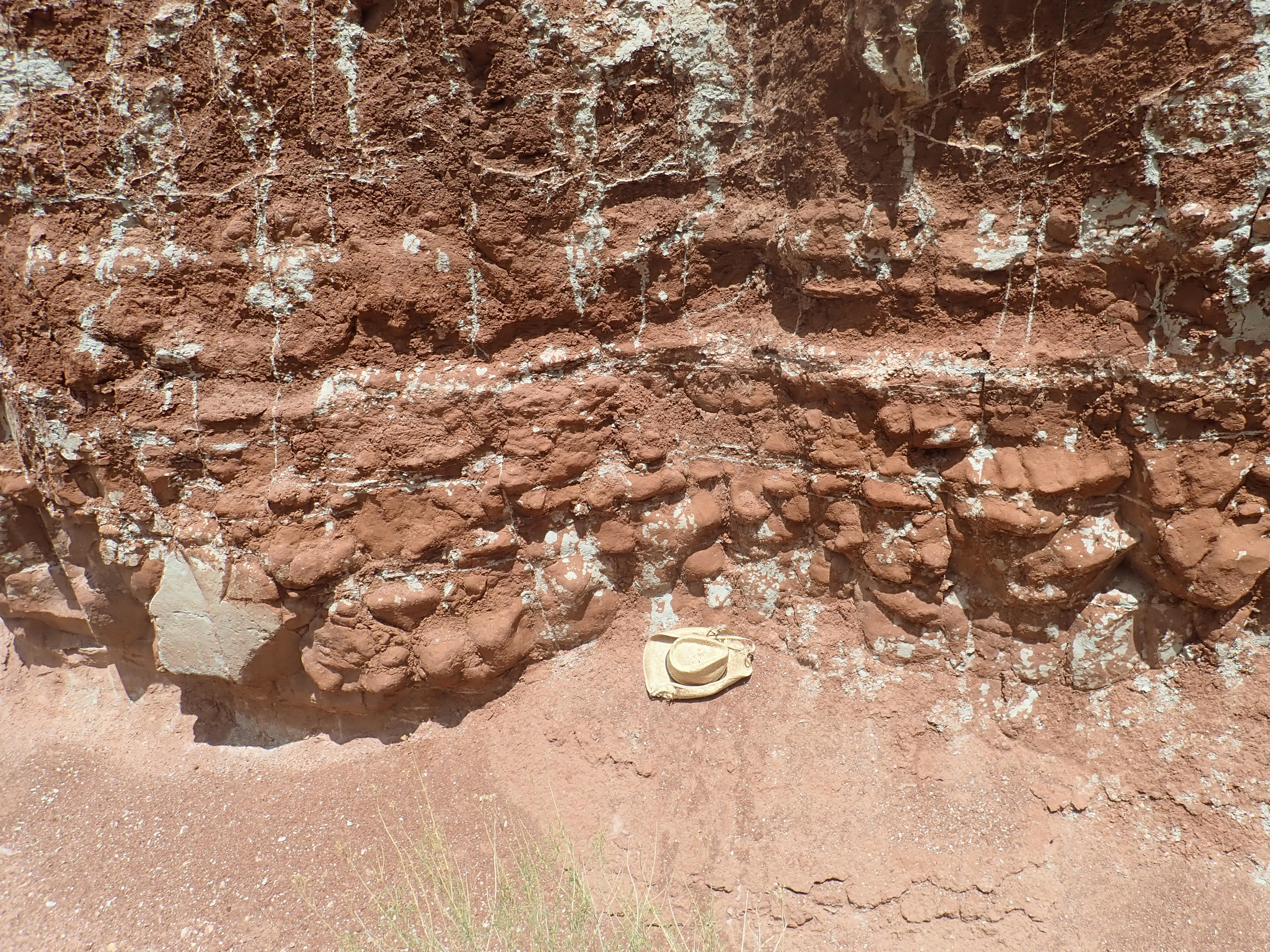
Bed of concretions in the Rock Point Formation near Youngsville, New Mexico

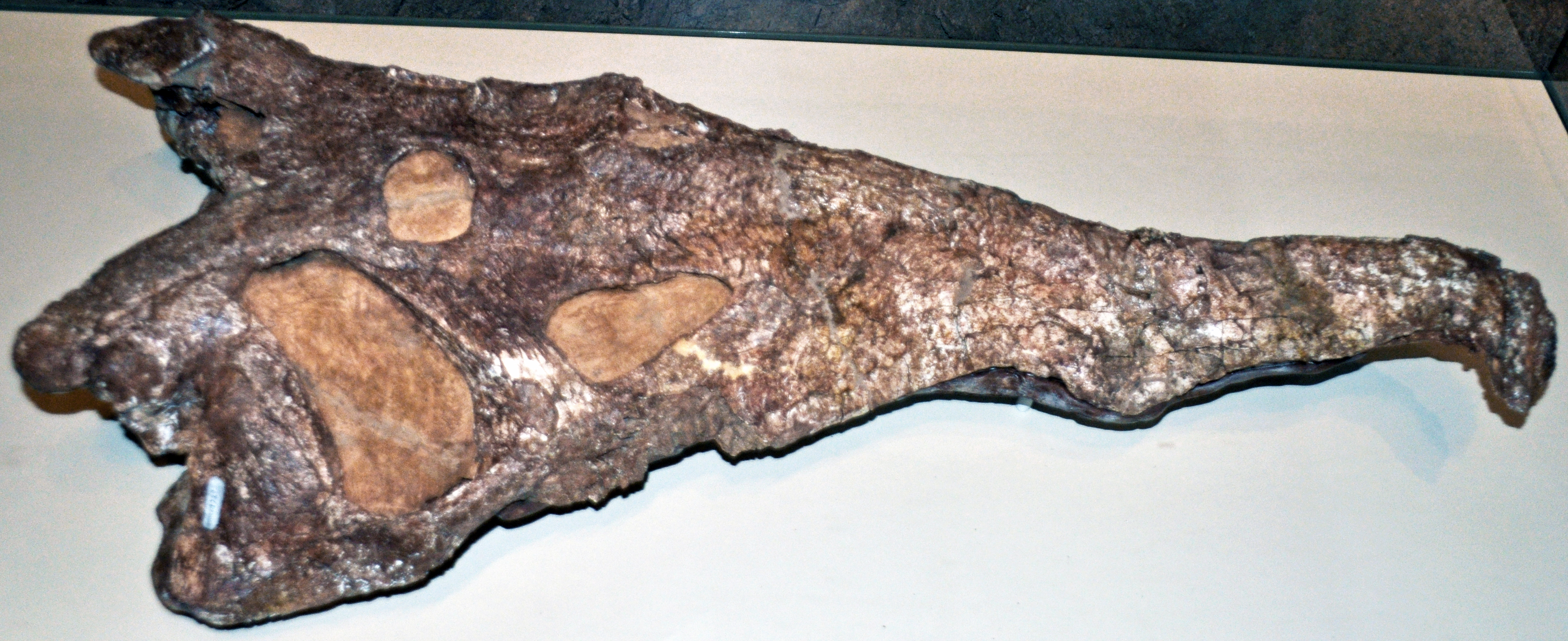
Fossil from Rock Point Formation

== See also ==
- List of fossiliferous stratigraphic units in Utah
- Paleontology in Utah
