= Laborcita Formation =

- Stratigraphic range: Gzhelian–Asselian
- Type: Formation
- Underlies: Abo Formation
- Overlies: Holder Formation
- Thickness: 400 feet (120 m)

Lithology
- Primary: Limestone, conglomerate, sandstone. shale

Location
- Coordinates: 33.011°N 105.941°W
- Region: New Mexico
- Country: United States

Type section
- Named for: Laborcita Canyon
- Named by: Otté
- Year defined: 1959
- Laborcita Formation (the United States) Laborcita Formation (New Mexico)

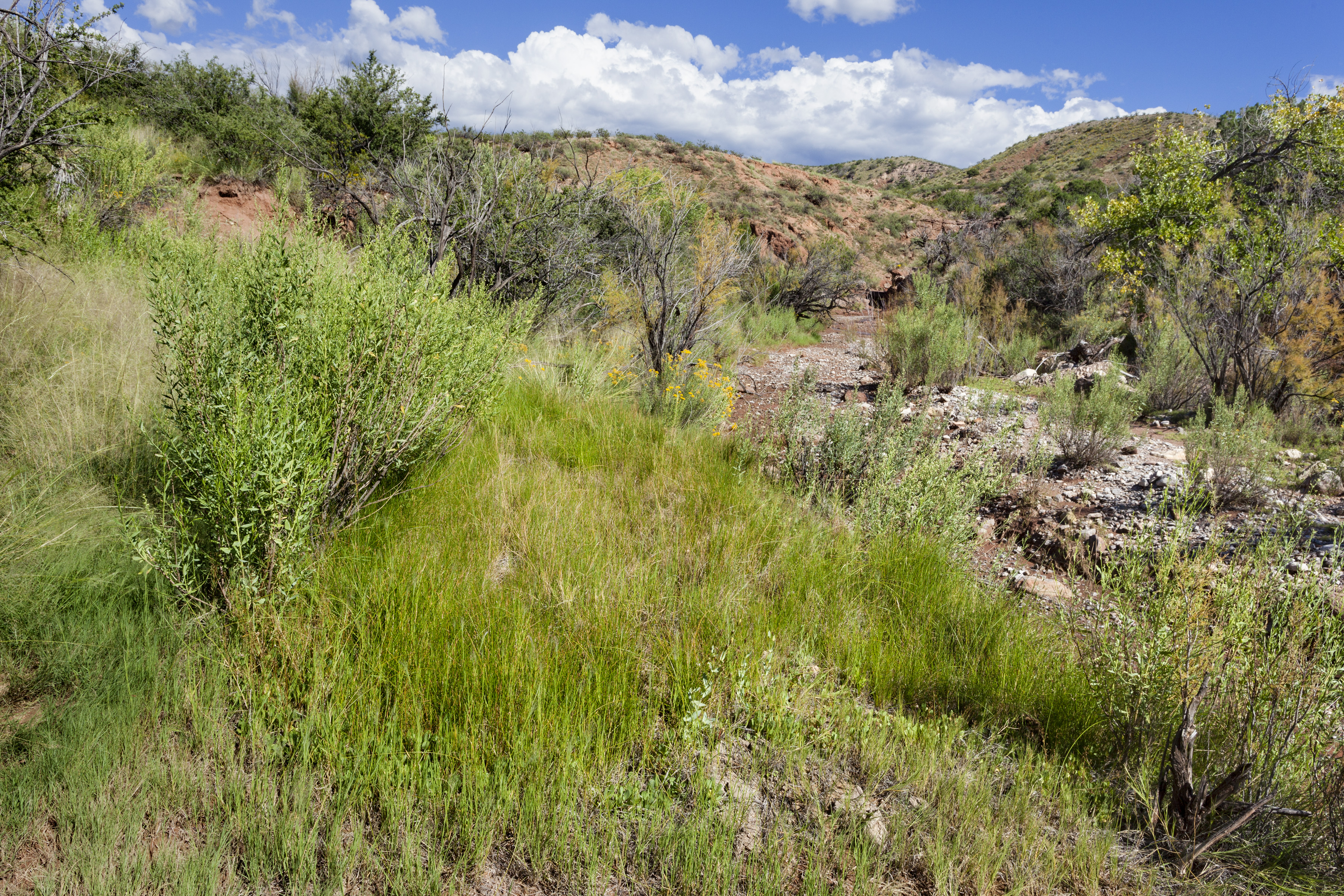
Type locality Laborcita Canyon, Sacramento Mountains, New Mexico

The Laborcita Formation is a geologic formation in the Sacramento Mountains of New Mexico. It preserves fossils dating back to the late Pennsylvanian to early Permian.

== Description ==
The formation is composed mostly of marine beds consisting of alternating cycles of limestone and siliciclastic sedimentary beds with a thickness of about 400 feet (120 m) at the type section. It is exposed only in a small area of the northernmost Sacramento Mountains, and transitions to mostly continental red mudstones some 1,000 feet (300 m) thick before abruptly pinching out to the southeast. The formation lies on the Holder Formation and is overlain by the Abo Formation.

The formation is interpreted as cyclic sequences of terrestrial and shallow marine carbonate rocks deposited on a narrow shelf lying between the Pedernal Uplift to the east and the Orogrande Basin to the west. Cycles are generally transgressive (recording the advance of the sea), with basal conglomerate giving way to increasingly fine sandstone, siltstone, and shale and finally limestone. Corresponding regressive sequences (recording the retreat of the sea) are very poorly developed.

== Fossils ==
The limestone beds of the formation are highly fossiliferous, containing bioclastic remains from all the main late Paleozoic shallow marine biotic groups. Fusulinids are present that are characteristic of the latest Pennsylvanian and earliest Permian. The uppermost beds contain algal bioherms 35–60 feet (11–18 m) thick. Microfossils of the formation include the cyanobacteria such as Girvanella, calcivertellid foraminiferans, and phylloid (leaflike) algae such as Eugonophyllum.

== History of investigation ==
The formation was first named by Otté in 1959 as part of his dissertation at the University of New Mexico.

== See also ==
- List of fossiliferous stratigraphic units in New Mexico
- Paleontology in New Mexico
