= Beeman Formation =

Geologic formation in New Mexico, US

- Stratigraphic range: Kasimovian
- Type: Formation
- Underlies: Holder Formation
- Overlies: Gobbler Formation
- Thickness: 350–500 ft (110–150 m)

Lithology
- Primary: Shale
- Other: Limestone, conglomerate

Location
- Coordinates: 32.83°N 105.905°W
- Region: New Mexico
- Country: United States

Type section
- Named for: Beeman Canyon
- Named by: L.C. Pray
- Year defined: 1954
- Beeman Formation (the United States) Beeman Formation (New Mexico)

The Beeman Formation is a geologic formation in the Sacramento Mountains of New Mexico. It preserves fossils dating back to the Kasimovian Age of the Pennsylvanian Period.

== Description ==
The Beeman Formation consists of cyclic shale and argillaceous limestone with some conglomerate. The thickness is 350–500 ft (110–150 m). The formation overlies the Gobbler Formation and is overlain by the Holder Formation.

The formation is interpreted as cyclic deposition on a continental shelf following rejuvenation of the Pedernal uplift of the Ancestral Rocky Mountains.

== Fossils ==
The unit contains middle to upper Missourian (Kasimovian) fusulinids and conodonts, including several species of the fusulinid Triticites and the conodont Idiognathodus symmetricus, related species, and species of Streptognathodus. These species indicate that the Beeman Formation is entirely Kasimovian in age. The formation has a diverse coprofauna. The formation has also produced a lacustrine fauna from one of its shell beds, including the horseshoe crab Euproops danae.

== History of investigation ==
The unit was first named by Lloyd C. Pray in 1954 and a type section was designated in 1959. Pray originally assigned the formation to the Magdalena Group, but the Magdalena Group has subsequently been abandoned.

== See also ==
- List of fossiliferous stratigraphic units in New Mexico
- Paleontology in New Mexico
