= Shinarump Conglomerate =

Geologic formation in the United States

- Stratigraphic range: early Late Triassic; 230–225 Ma
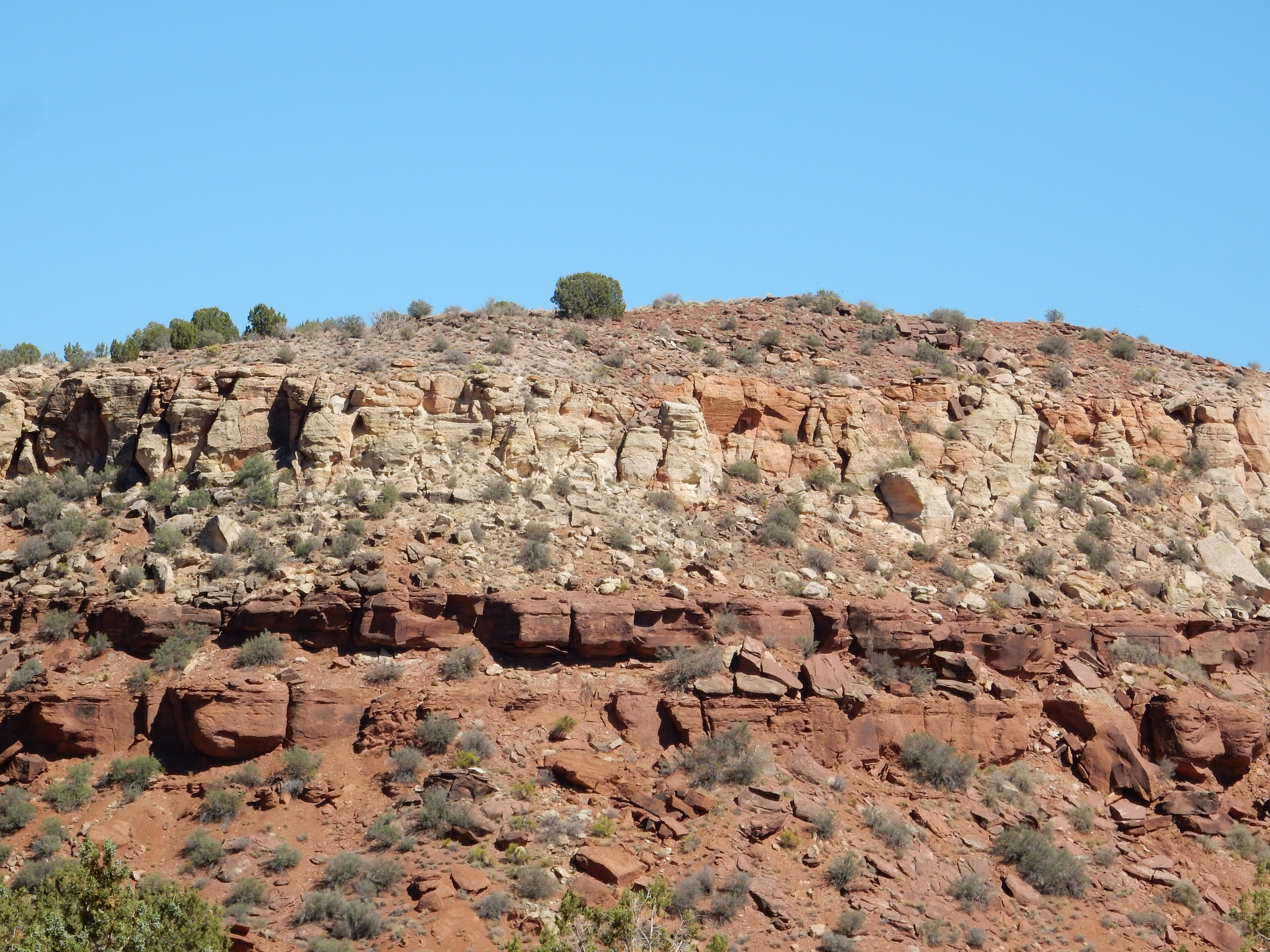
- Shinarump Conglomerate at the Shinarump Cliffs, its type area
- Type: Geological formation
- Unit of: Chinle Formation
- Underlies: Petrified Forest Member and other sub-units, Chinle Formation
- Overlies: Moenkopi Formation units-(250-225 Ma), after erosion unconformity Temple Mountain Member-(lowest Chinle Formation), Moenkopi Formation-(Monument Valley, Arizona-Utah), De Chelly Sandstone-(50 ma erosion unconformity-Canyon De Chelly National Monument)
- Thickness: 200 feet (61 m) maximum variable

Lithology
- Primary: conglomerate, sandstone, siltstone

Location
- Coordinates: 37.012°N 112.358°W
- Region: Colorado Plateau
- Extent: NNW-southeast perimeter Black Mesa (Arizona); NE & E-Defiance Plateau-(Uplift); S-north perimeter foothills White Mountains; W & NW-Painted Desert

Type section
- Named for: Shinarump Cliffs
- Named by: Gilbert
- Year defined: 1875
- Shinarump Conglomerate (the United States) Shinarump Conglomerate (Utah)

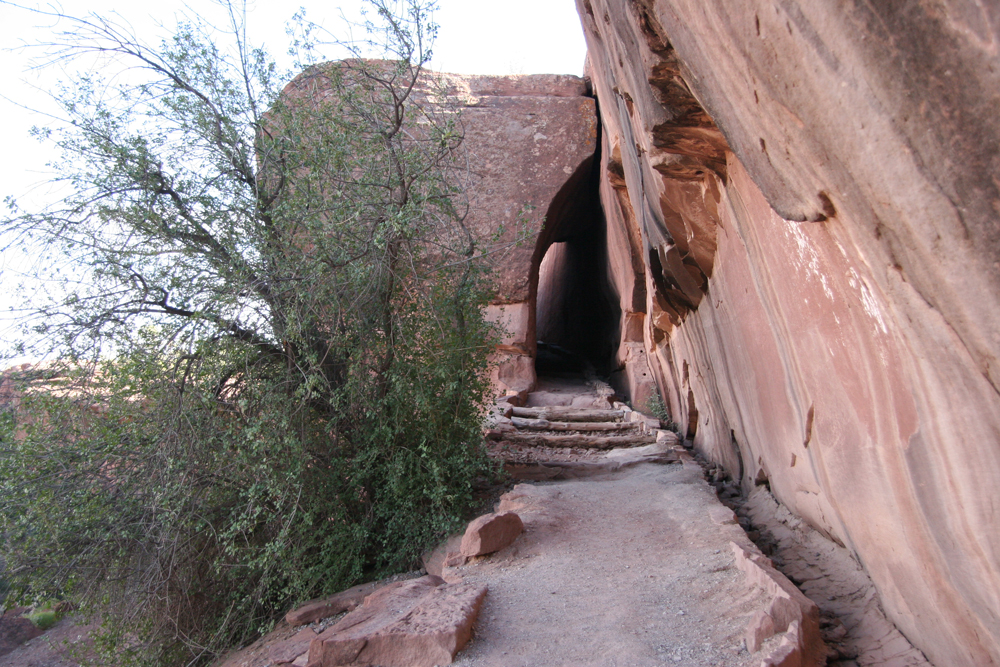
Massive, fallen Shinarump Conglomerate block (erosion-resistant) at start of trail (viewed up-trail) down to White House Ruin, Canyon De Chelly National Monument (Note: pictured beside smooth-sided cliffs of the underlying De Chelly Sandstone)

The Shinarump Conglomerate is a geologic formation found in the Four Corners region of the United States. It was deposited in the early part of the Late Triassic period.

== Description ==
The Shinarump Conglomerate is a highly resistant coarse-grained sandstone and pebble conglomerate (minor or major conglomerates are a typical base layer after unconformities or disconformities; the Shinarump is a major conglomerate) with rare lenses of mudstone, sometimes forming a caprock because of its hardness, cementation, and erosion resistance. The Shinarump is found throughout the Colorado Plateau with significant exposures as the canyon rimrock in the vicinity of Canyon De Chelly National Monument, at the north-northeast of the Defiance Plateau/Defiance Uplift. At Canyon De Chelly the Shinarump Conglomerate was laid down upon De Chelly Sandstone-(280 Ma, an erosion unconformity of 50 my), in a region at the west foothill region of the mostly north–south trending Chuska Mountains of northeast Arizona – northwest New Mexico.

Just northwest of Canyon De Chelly, the Shinarump also forms a caprock in Monument Valley across the border region of northern Arizona – and southern Utah. The Shinarump Conglomerate there is laid upon units of the Moenkopi Formation and remain as resistant caprocks preserving the vertical cliffs of De Chelly Sandstone and other units of the Monument Upwarp/Monument Uplift. The associated Black Mesa (Arizona)-Defiance Uplift extends southeast from Monument Valley into the western border region of New Mexico. The relatively steep east dip of geology units results in increasingly younger geologic units eastwards into New Mexico.

In west-central New Mexico, the Shinarump is thin and spotty, transitioning to laterally equivalent beds of the Zuni Mountains Formation. The latter is variegated sandstone and siltstone with abundant rhizoliths.

The Shinarump Conglomerate is again well-exposed along the Nacimiento Uplift in north-central New Mexico. In this area, it acts as a caprock for Red Mesa, Joaquin Mesa, Blue Bird Mesa, and Eureka Mesa, among other locations. Here it was long known as the Agua Zarca Sandstone Member of the Chinle Formation. However, that name was abandoned in favor of Shinarump in 2003.

== Monument Valley and Canyon De Chelly caprock ==
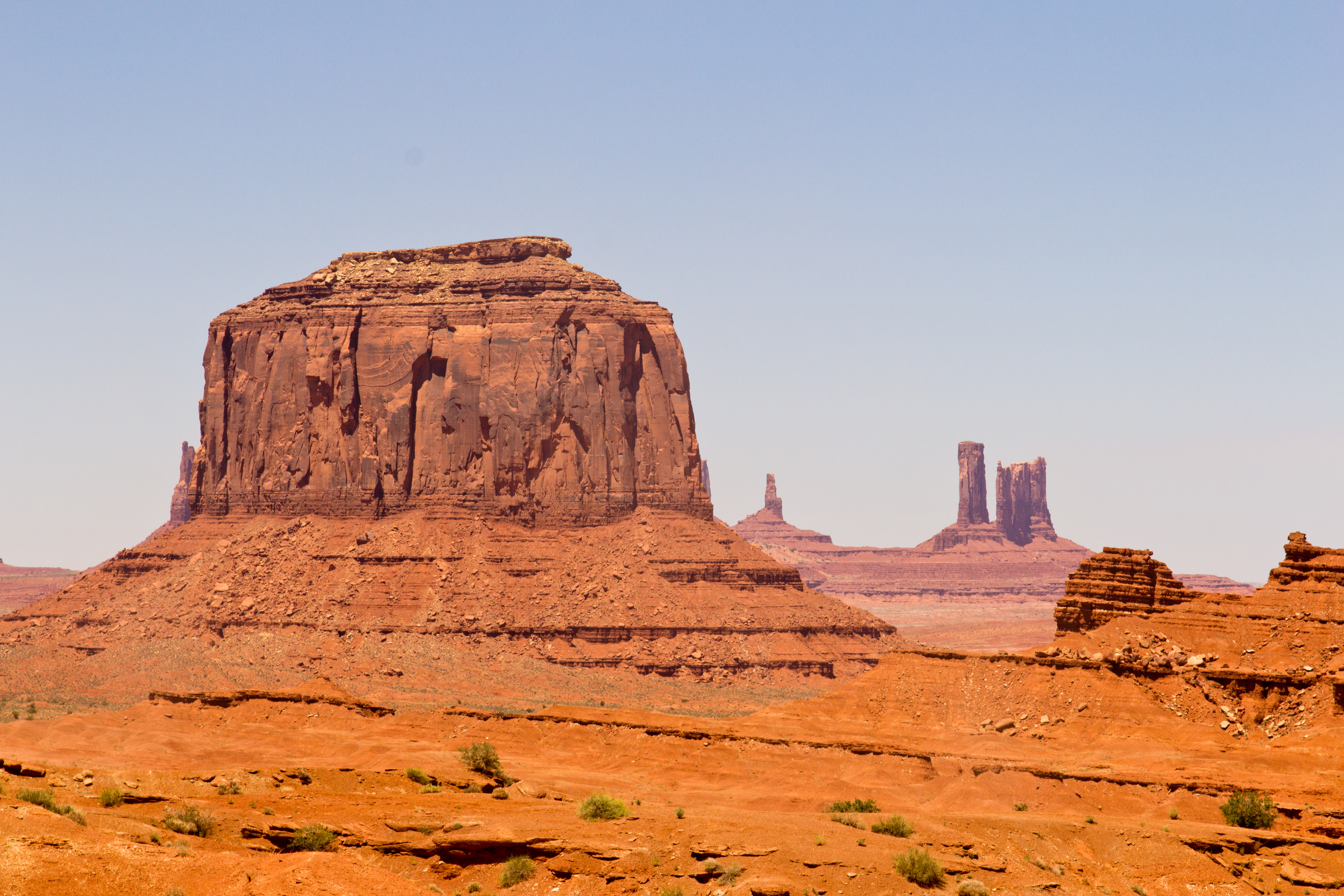
5)-(horizontal)-Shinarump Conglomerate, 4)-(horizontal)-Moenkopi Formation, 3)-vertical cliffs of De Chelly Sandstone, and 2)-skirts/erosion slopes of Organ Rock Formation-(horizontally bedded) The angular unconformity below is upon the 1)-low angle dipping Cedar Mesa Sandstone, commonly of southeast Utah

In Monument Valley, of Arizona and south Utah, only larger landforms still contain the protective caprock of the Shinarump Conglomerate. The vertical cliffs of highly resistant De Chelly Sandstone protect the highly erodable Organ Rock Formation that forms 'erosion skirts' at the base of the vertical monuments in Monument Valley. For larger mesas, or larger connected land forms, where the more erodable overlying Moenkopi Formation, has not been lost, (with the caprock Shinarump also being undermined), larger sections of Shinarump are thus preserved. Perimeter mesas in the Monument Valley region have the caprock protecting the upper surface, plants, and alluvium from easy erosion of the landform surface.

At Canyon de Chelly, the trail to White House Ruin, descends through the Shinarump Conglomerate, but also has a tributary slot canyon landform with large accumulations of the Shinarump erosional debris on the slot-canyon floor. The trail then descends through the cross–bedded cliffs (fossil sand dunes) of the De Chelly Sandstone.

== Geologic history ==
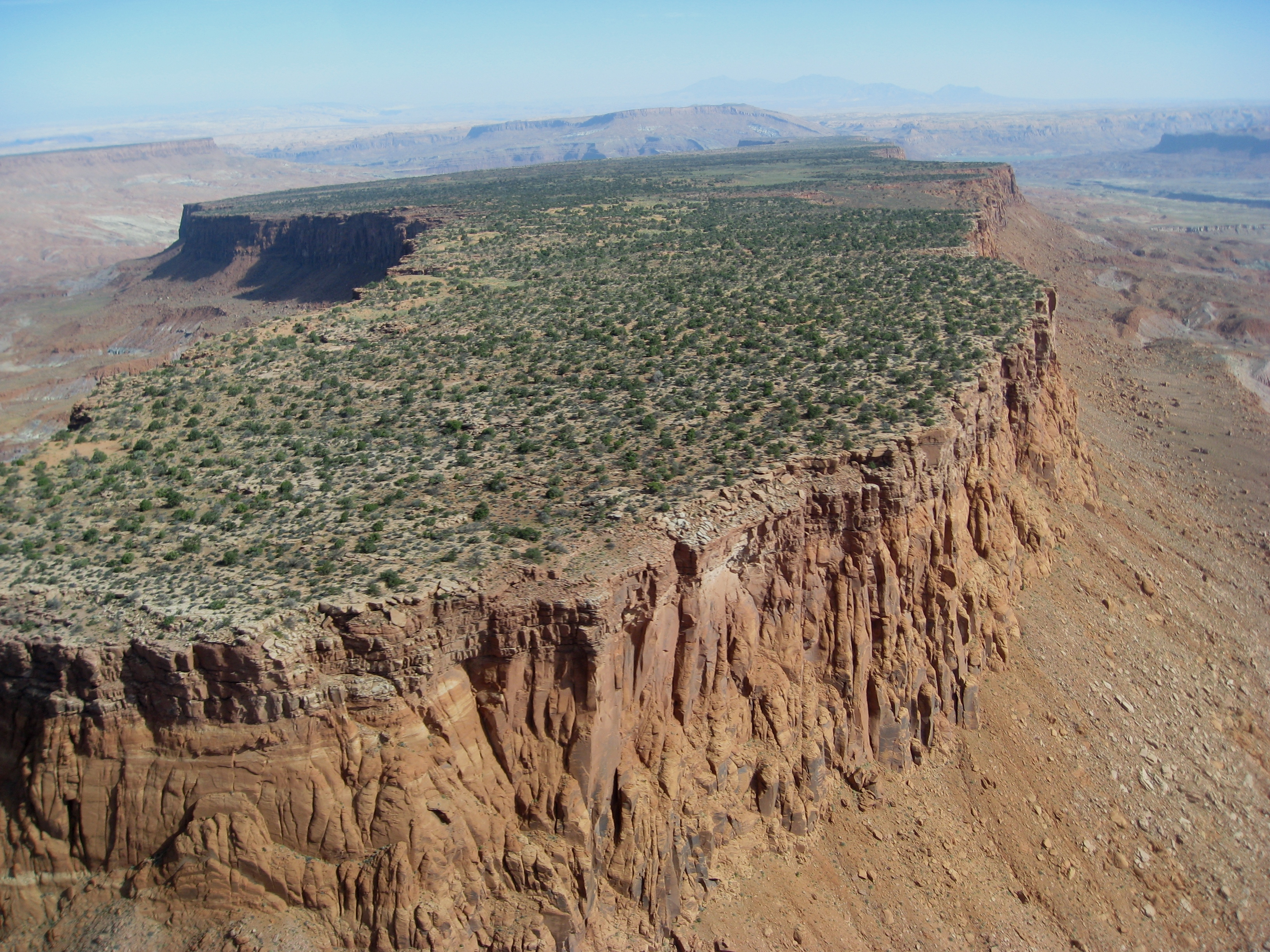
Monument Valley mesa, with cliffs of De Chelly Sandstone

The Shinarump was deposited by a system of braided streams on a relatively flat erosional surface. Though generally uniform in thickness, its lower contact is one of the most prominent unconformities in the Colorado Plateau, occasionally filling deep channels eroded into the underlying beds. The largest of these, on the west side of Monument Valley, is 3,000 feet (910 meters) wide and 275 feet (84 meters) deep. The form of the channels suggests that the Moenkopi was not yet consolidated, but the de Chelly Sandstone was already well cemented, by the time Shinarump deposition began. Where the Shinarump lies on Moenkopi Formation, the upper Moenkopi beds tend to be bleached.

The upper contact of the Shinarump with younger Chinle beds tends to be gradational.

The partial geologic sequence is as follows, up to the latest Petrified Forest Member:

Petrified Forest Member, Late Triassic, 215 Ma
Shinarump Conglomerate, 225 Ma
Holbrook Member, Moenkopi, Middle Triassic, 240 Ma
Virgin Limestone Member, Moenkopi, (245-240 Ma)
Timpoweap and Sinbad members of the Moenkopi Formation, Early Triassic, 245 Ma

By the end of the Early and Middle Triassic the 'Triassic Seas' of the western ocean edge of the North American continent were retreating northwest with deposition of the Shinarump (225 Ma) and Petrified Forest Member (215 Ma). Highlands existed in southern Arizona and New Mexico, and in central and eastern regions of Nevada. These source areas provided the volcanic units of the Petrified Forest Member. The varied composition and oxidation of the included volcanic material provide the colorful units of the Chinle Formation of the Painted Desert, and specifically the units in Petrified Forest National Park at the southeast of the Painted Desert. The desert extends in an arc-shape, paralleling the northwest–by–southeast lineage of the Mogollon Rim, but turns due-north, east of Flagstaff, Arizona, on the east border of the San Francisco volcanic field region, as the Little Colorado River turns north, then northwest to enter the Grand Canyon region.

This arc-shaped Painted Desert region surrounds the south and west border of Black Mesa, the Monument Valley to the north, and the Defiance Plateau to the southeast. The southeast also has a perimeter of the Puerco River which flows southwestwards out of New Mexico and merges into the Little Colorado River. The caprock remainders of the Shinarump Conglomerate lie to north-northeast of the Defiance Uplift-Monument Upwarp.

== Fossils ==
J.S. Newberry visited the abandoned copper mines of the Cañon del Cobre (36.300°N 106.352°W) in 1859 and discovered thousands of leaf impressions in a shale bed exposed in the roofs of the mine adits. Ash revisited the mines and confirmed in 1974 that the fossils included the conifers Brachyphyllum sp., Pagiophyllum newberryi Ward ex. Daugherty, and Araucarioxylon arizonicum Knowlton, and the cycads Otozamites macombii Newberry, 0. powelli (Fontaine) Berry, and Zamites occidentalis Newberry. Ferns were conspicuously absent. The flora are characteristic of the earliest late Triassic (Carnian age).

== Economic geology ==
Mining of stratiform copper deposits in the Shinarump Conglomerate began at Cañon del Cobre in the 1600s but seems to have been abandoned by 1859. Copper was mined as chalcocite and other replacement minerals in petrified wood. Similar ore beds were mined at the Nacimiento Mine from the late 1880s to 1975, with production peaking at 4000 tons a day. A subsequent attempt at in-situ leaching of the ore was unsuccessful, requiring a massive clean-up effort. This has treated 67 million gallons since 2011.

The Shinarump has also yielded uranium, primarily from locally deep channels cut into the underlying beds and subsequently filled with Shinarump sediments.

== History of investigation ==
The Shinarump Conglomerate was first defined by G.K. Gilbert in 1875 and named for exposures in the Shinarump Cliffs, which straddle the Utah-Arizona border. Stewart reduced the unit to a member of the Chinle Formation in 1957. The unit is given formation rank in New Mexico, where the Chinle is promoted to a group.
