= Orogrande Basin =

Geologic province in southern New Mexico

Coordinates: 32°24′N 106°06′W

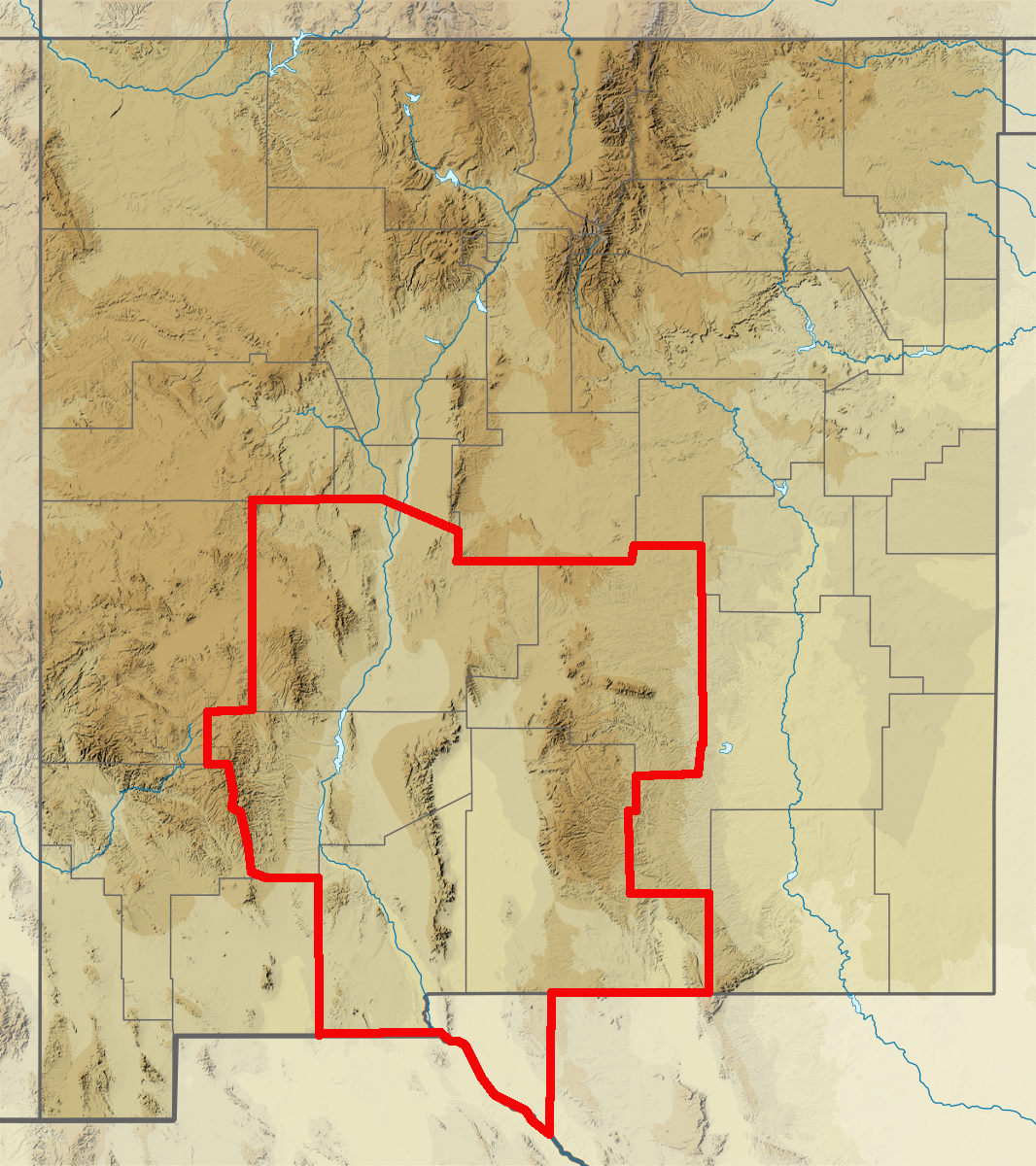
Map of the Orogrande Basin geologic province, New Mexico, US

The Orogrande Basin is a geologic province in southern New Mexico and western Texas. It includes Doña Ana, Sierra, Socorro, Lincoln, and Otero Counties in New Mexico and El Paso County, Texas. The province takes its name from the community of Orogrande, New Mexico.

== Geology ==
The province is named for the Orogrande Basin, which was a shallow marine basin during the Carboniferous. This basin was one of several basins that opened along the southwestern margin of the North American craton due to crustal stress from the Ouachita Orogeny. At this time, this area was very close to the equator. Up to 910 meters (3,000 ft) of limestones and shales were deposited. These included sediments from a Carboniferous mountain range, the Pedernal Uplift, located to the east.

A narrow shelf, the Sacramento Shelf, was located between the basin and mountain range, and formations in this area from the Carboniferous are notable for their algal mounds. This steep shelf margin gave way further west to a gently inclined ramp, the Robledo Ramp. The Gobbler Formation is typical of middle Pennsylvanian deposition in the basin. The Orogrande Basin was centered on the present-day Tularosa Basin.
