= Palo Duro basin =

Geologic province in Texas, New Mexico, and Oklahoma, US

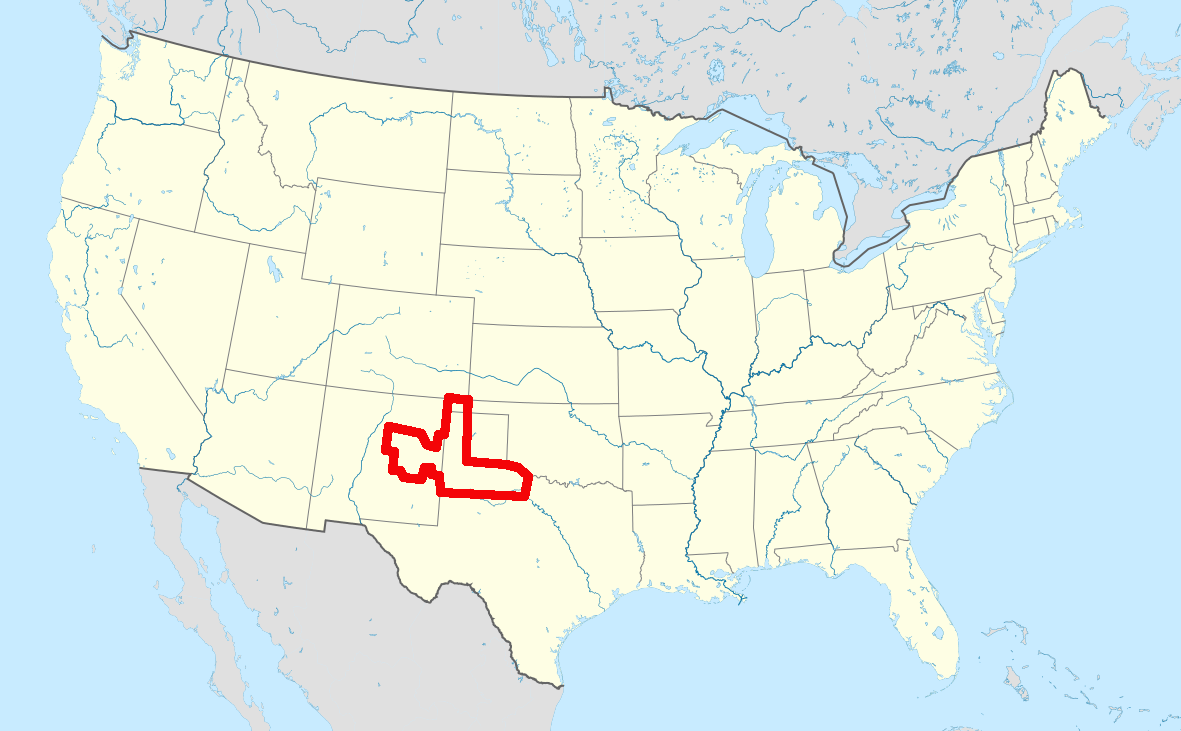
Palo Duro geologic province

The Palo Duro basin is a geologic province and structural basin in Texas, New Mexico, and Oklahoma, US.

== Geology ==
The Palo Duro basin is centered in the southern Texas Panhandle. It is bounded on the north by the Amarillo Uplift and other structures that separate it from the Anadarko Basin. To the south, it is bounded by the Matador Arch. Its east and west margins are defined by broad structural divides.

The basin was formed by subsidence during the Pennsylvanian and Permian Periods, from about 323 to 252 million years ago. This was associated with the Ancestral Rocky Mountains orogeny (mountain-building episode). Additional subsidence took place during the Permian and Triassic. Some of the structures defining the Palo Duro basin are much older and were reactivated during its formation. The basin accumulated evaporite beds during the Permian, and later dissolution of these beds deformed overlying strata.

The basin has been evaluated for its hydrocarbon potential and for its possible use to store high-level nuclear waste.
