= Gobbler Formation =

Geologic formation in New Mexico, US

- Stratigraphic range: Moscovian
- Type: Formation
- Underlies: Beeman Formation
- Overlies: Lake Valley Limestone
- Thickness: 1,200–1,600 ft (370–490 m)

Lithology
- Primary: Limestone, sandstone, shale
- Other: Conglomerate

Location
- Coordinates: 32.83°N 105.905°W
- Region: New Mexico
- Country: United States

Type section
- Named for: Gobbler (dome and triangulation station)
- Named by: L. C. Pray
- Year defined: 1954
- Gobbler Formation (the United States) Gobbler Formation (New Mexico)

The Gobbler Formation is a geologic formation in the Sacramento Mountains of New Mexico. It preserves fossils dating back to the Moscovian Age of the Pennsylvanian Period.

== Description ==
The Gobbler Formation consists of a lower section of 200–500 feet (61–152 m) of quartz sandstone and limestone and an upper section of over 1,000 feet (300 m) of shales and quartz sandstones. The lower sandstone beds are well-sorted and the limestone includes black masses of chert. These beds intruded by sills possibly of Tertiary age. The upper beds interfinger with limestone assigned to the Bug Scuffle Limestone Member of the Gobbler Formation. The total thickness is 1,200–1,600 feet (370–490 m). The formation overlies the Lake Valley Limestone, from which it is separated by a subaerial erosion surface with paleochannels as deep as 100 feet (30 m) The Gobbler Formation underlies the Beeman Formation.

The Bug Scuffle Limestone Member contains parasequences 3–20 meters (9.8–65.6 ft) thick whose uppermost beds show isotopic evidence of subaerial exposure.

The formation is prominently exposed at Oliver Lee Memorial State Park, where the Bug Scuffle Member forms prominent cliffs.

== Fossils ==
The sandstone beds locally contain plant fossils. The Bug Scuffle Limestone Member is mostly sparsely fossiliferous, with occasional local concentrations of a variety of fossils including bryozoans, corals, crinoids, coralline algae, and foraminifera. These include the crinoids Lecythiocrinus and Paragassizocrinus. The base of the formation contains earliest Morrowan (Bashkirian) conodonts.

== History of investigation ==
The unit was first named by Pray in 1954 and a type section was designated in 1961.

== See also ==
- List of fossiliferous stratigraphic units in New Mexico
- Paleontology in New Mexico
