= Petrified Forest Member =

Lithostratigraphic layer of the Chinle formation

- Stratigraphic range: late Triassic, 240–215 Ma
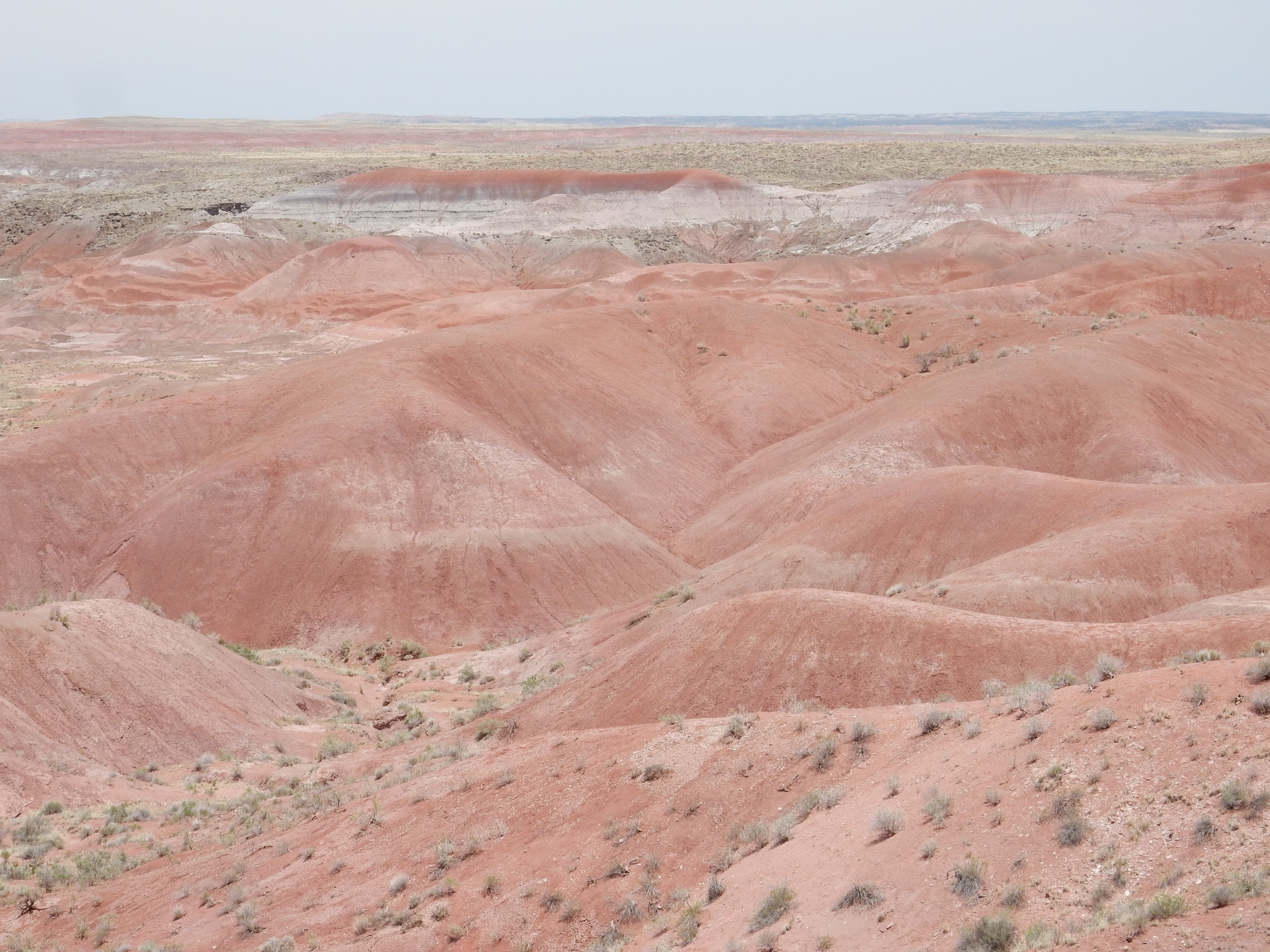
- Petrified Forest Member at its type location, north of Tiponi Point, Petrified Forest National Park
- Type: member
- Unit of: Chinle Formation
- Underlies: Rock Point Formation
- Overlies: Poleo Formation

Lithology
- Primary: Mudstone
- Other: Sandstone, siltstone

Location
- Coordinates: 35.074°N 109.780°W
- Region: New Mexico
- Country: United States

Type section
- Named for: Petrified Forest, Navajo and Apache Counties, AZ
- Named by: Herbert E. Gregory
- Year defined: 1947
- Petrified Forest Member (the United States) Petrified Forest Member (Arizona)

The Petrified Forest Member is a stratigraphic unit of the Chinle Formation in Arizona, Colorado, New Mexico, Nevada, and Utah. It preserves fossils dating back to the Triassic period.

== Subunits ==
Beds (are in alphabetical order, asterisks (*) indicate usage by the U.S. Geological Survey, other usages by state geological surveys):

- Capitol Reef Bed (UT*)
- Correo Sandstone Bed (NM*)
- Sonsela Sandstone Bed (AZ*, NM*)

In the Chama Basin of New Mexico, the Chinle Formation is promoted to group status and the Petrified Forest Formation has the following members:

- Painted Desert Member
- Mesa Montoso Member

The Mesa Montosa Member is up to 22 meters (72 feet) thick and is mostly composed of sandstone (44%) and mudstone (35%), with a lesser proportion of siltstone (20%). The color is reddish brown to brown and the sandstone is thinly bedded and ripple laminated.

The Painted Desert Member is up to 176 meters (577 feet) thick and is primarily reddish brown bentonitic mudstone. The name was originally applied to the beds above the Sonsela Sandstone Bed in Petrified Forest National Park in eastern Arizona. Correlative beds of similar lithology are found throughout west-central and central New Mexico and the Four Corners. The Black Forest Bed within this member has a maximum age of 213 ± 1.7 Ma based on detrital zircon geochronology, with an actual age estimated as 209 Ma. This places the upper part of the Painted Desert Member in the latest Norian age.

== Fossils ==
The Snyder quarry, discovered by amateur fossil hunter Mark Snyder near the town of Abiquiu, New Mexico, in 1998, is an unusually productive and diverse bone bed in the Petrified Forest Formation. Abundant charcoal suggests a mass kill due to a paleowildfire. Fossils include archosaurs, procolophonids, metoposaurid amphibians, semionotid fish, a decapod, a conchostracan, and unionid bivalves.

== See also ==
- List of fossiliferous stratigraphic units in New Mexico
- Paleontology in New Mexico
