= Edwin E. Howell =

American geologist and cartographer

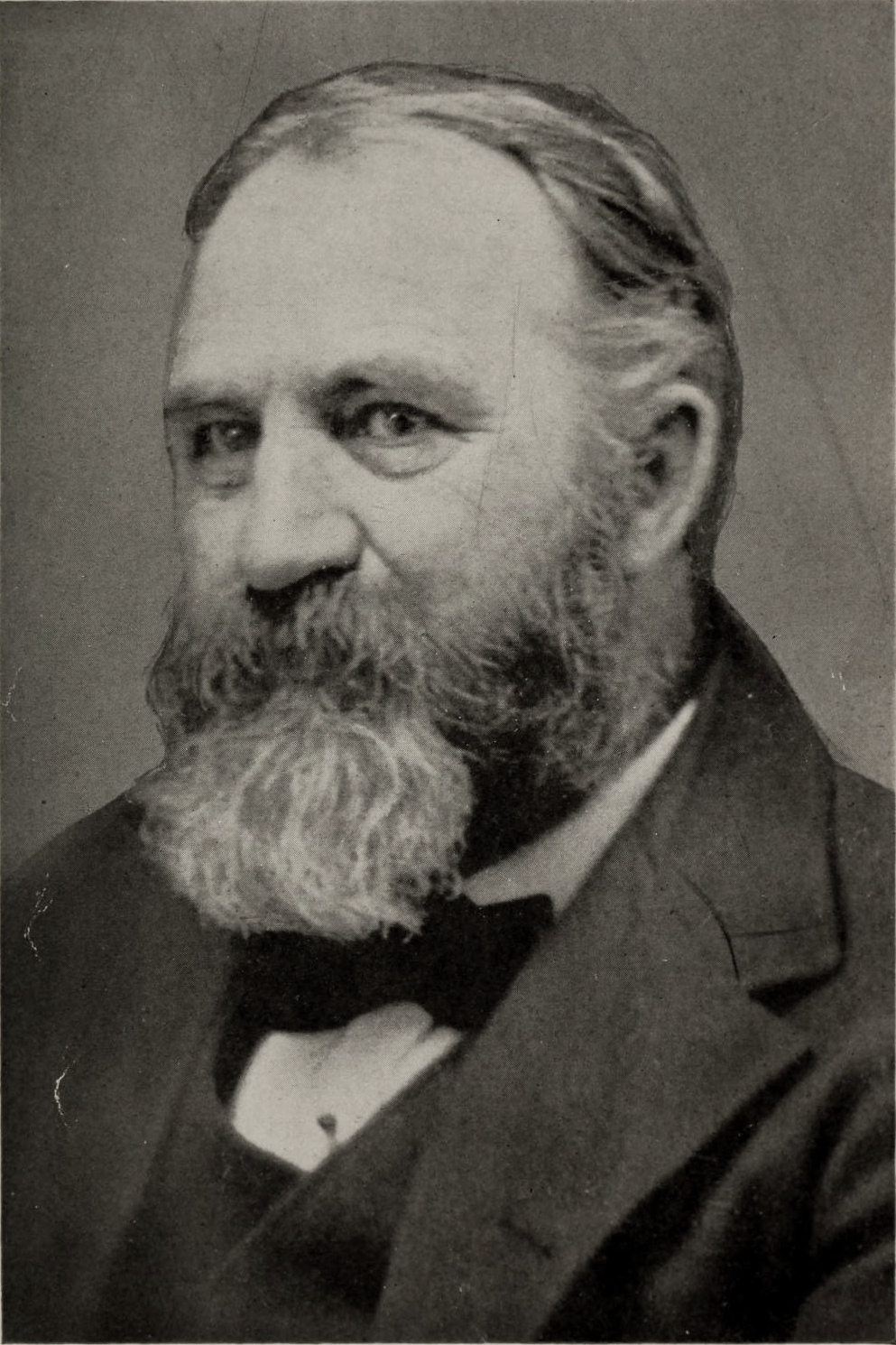
Edwin E. Howell

Edwin Eugene Howell (March 12, 1845 – April 16, 1911) was an American geologist and cartographer, who produced some of the most detailed raised-relief maps of his time, for which he was regarded by geologist G. K. Gilbert as "a pioneer—if not the pioneer—in the United States." His maps were known internationally, and he produced the first commercial relief map of the Grand Canyon.

Howell was born in Genesee County, New York, and studied at the University of Rochester under the geologist Henry A. Ward. He was geologist of the United States Geological Survey in surveys west of the Rocky Mountains in 1872–73, and was with the government survey of the Rocky Mountain region under John Wesley Powell in 1874. In 1870 he made a relief map of the island of San Domingo, and in 1875 produced his famous relief map of the Grand Canyon. In his later years he devoted his time to the manufacture of geological models and maps first in the Rochester Museum and then in an establishment at Washington, D.C. which he called The Microcosm. He wrote on meteorites, and was a founder of the Geological Society of America. He died in Washington in 1911, aged 66.
