= Beresellaceae =

Beresellaceae Temporal range: Late Devonian-Early Permian ~428–295 Ma

Scientific classification
- Kingdom: Plantae
- Division: Chlorophyta
- Class: Ulvophyceae
- Order: Dasycladales (?)
- Family: †Beresellaceae; Deloffre, 1988

Genera
- Beresella; Dvinella; Uraloporella?

Extinct family of algae

Beresellaceae is an extinct family of organisms of uncertain affinity, sometimes placed within the Metazoa (multicellular animals), but tentatively assigned to the green alga order Dasycladales. Beresellids were cosmopolitan and their fossils are found in strata ranging in age from the late Devonian to the early Permian.

Members of the family took the form of calcareous cylindrical tubes 100 to 400 micrometers (3,900 to 15,700 μin) in diameter and up to 5 millimeters (0.20 in) in length. The tubes are single or (rarely) paired with an axial canal that is often replaced with clear calcite during fossilization. Classification is based on the distinctive two-layer walls and verticils (blind pores) branching outward from the cylindrical body. The organism likely was surrounded by a mucilaginous coating, preserved in fossils as transparent calcite cement. As of 1998, no reproductive structures have been found for members of this group.

Beresellids became important marine carbonate sediment producers in the middle Carboniferous, in association with various phylloid algae. They are thought to have favored shallow, sheltered lagoons. Local accumulations were sometimes extensive enough to be distinguished as beresellid bafflestone or packstone, making this a rock-forming family of algae.
