= Herbert E. Gregory =

Herbert Ernest Gregory
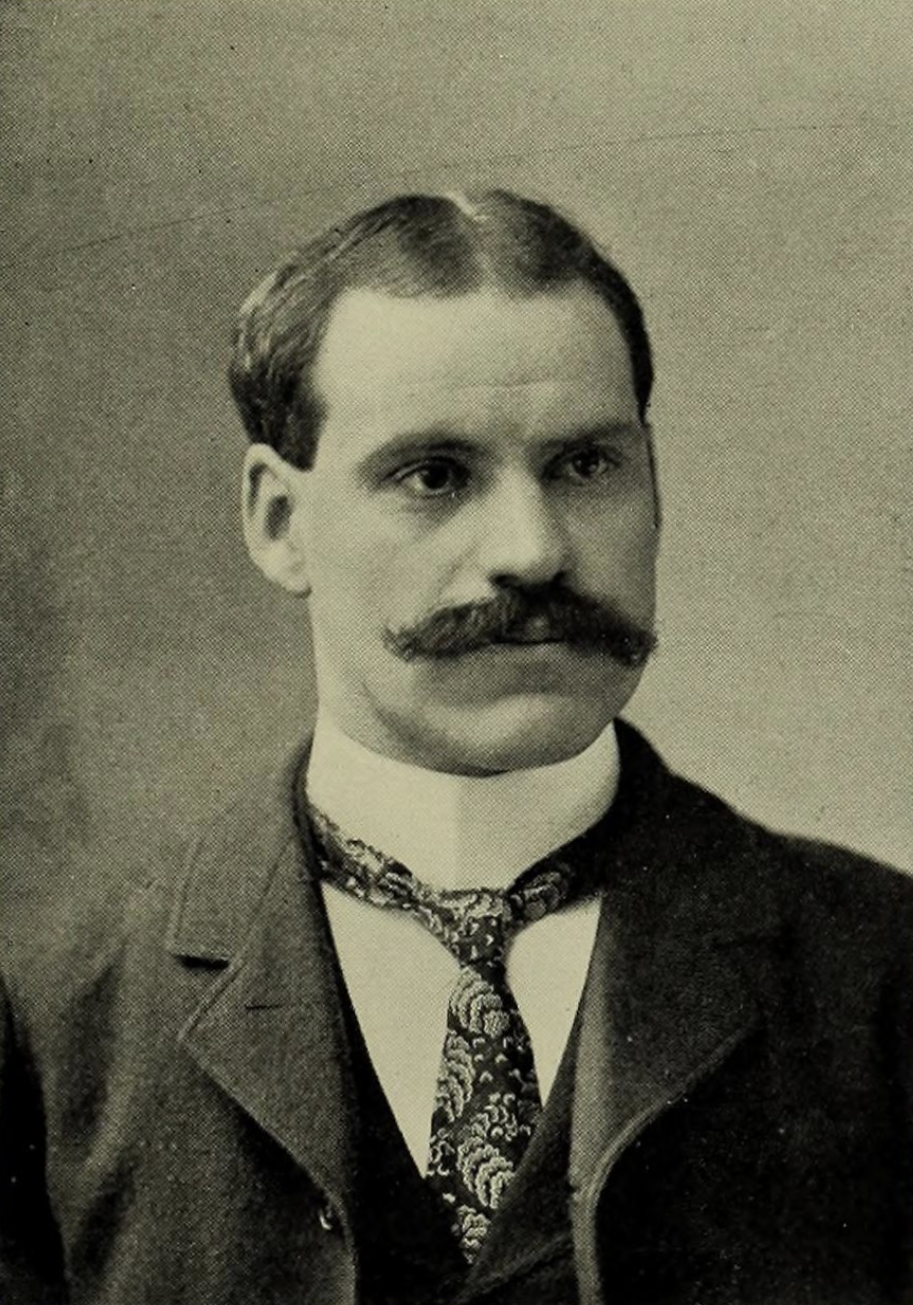
- Born: October 15, 1869; Middleville, Michigan, US
- Died: January 23, 1952 (aged 82); Honolulu, Territory of Hawaii
- Education: Gates College B.S. (1890); Yale University A.B. (1896)
- Occupation: Geologist

Herbert Ernest Gregory (October 15, 1869 – January 23, 1952) was a Yale University geologist well known for his early 20th-century explorations of the Colorado Plateau in Arizona and Utah. One of his most important works is Colorado Plateau Region, published by the United States Geological Survey on the occasion of the United States sponsoring the 16th International Geological Congress.

== Biography ==
Gregory was born October 15, 1869, in Middleville, Michigan, to George A. Gregory and Jane Bross. He grew up in Crete, Nebraska, and attended the Gates Academy. In 1890, he received his B.S. at Gates College located in Neligh, Nebraska. Gregory worked as a civil engineer for Boston & Maine Railroad from 1890 to 1891 before becoming an instructor at Chadron Academy from 1891 to 1893. He then taught at Gates College from 1893–1895 and graduated with an A.B. from Yale University in 1896. He was a student at Harvard University under American geographer William Morris Davis. He was the director of the geology department at Yale University, where he worked to expand the department to include a human geography emphasis. Gregory was elected to the American Academy of Arts and Sciences in 1917 and the American Philosophical Society in 1923. From 1919 to 1936 he served as director of the Bishop Museum in Hawaii, where, in 1961, after his death, he was honored by a medal named after him. The Herbert E. Gregory Medal is awarded every four years by the Pacific Science Association to a leading scientist in the Pacific Region.

His seminal work included mapping much of the bedrock geology of the Colorado Plateau, particularly in geologic monographs concentrating on what is now the Navajo Nation in northeastern Arizona and southeastern Utah. Among many other achievements, he was the first to name and describe the Upper Triassic Chinle Formation, which is famous for preserving extensive fossil evidence of Late Triassic terrestrial ecosystems, including fossilized logs.

In 1931, Gregory published the first geological map of the Grand Staircase–Escalante National Monument. Gregory stated that no fossils had been discovered; however, many were later found.

Gregory died January 23, 1952, in Honolulu in the then Territory of Hawaii.
