= List of phytosaur-bearing stratigraphic units =

Geological strata known to contain the fossils of the extinct group of reptiles known as phytosaurs occur predominantly in the United States and Europe.

== List of formations ==
Group or Formation	Period	Country
Argilliti di Riva di Solto Formation	Triassic	Italy
Baldy Hill Formation	Triassic	United States
Cenger Formation	Triassic	Turkey
Chatham Group/Bull Run Formation	Triassic	United States
Chatham Group/New Haven Formation	Triassic	United States
Chinle Formation	Triassic	United States
Chinle Group/Bluewater Creek Formation	Triassic	United States
Chinle Group/Dockum Formation	Triassic	United States
Chinle Group/Garita Creek Formation	Triassic	United States
Chinle Group/Petrified Forest Formation	Triassic	United States
Chinle Group/Redonda Formation	Triassic	United States
Chinle Group/San Pedro Arroyo Formation	Triassic	United States
Chinle Group/Santa Rosa Formation	Triassic	United States
Chinle Group/Sloan Canyon Formation	Triassic	United States
Chinle Group/Tecovas Formation	Triassic	United States
Chinle Group/Trujillo Formation	Triassic	United States
Chugwater Group/Popo Agie Formation	Triassic	United States
Dockum Formation	Triassic	United States
Dockum Group/Bull Canyon Formation	Triassic	United States
Dockum Group/Camp Springs Formation	Triassic	United States
Dockum Group/Colorado City Formation	Triassic	United States
Dockum Group/Cooper Canyon Formation	Triassic	United States
Dockum Group/Santa Rosa Formation	Triassic	United States
Dockum Group/Tecovas Formation	Triassic	United States
Dockum Group/Trujillo Formation	Triassic	United States
Doswell Group/Falling Creek Formation	Triassic	United States
Drawno Beds Formation	Triassic	Poland
Fleming Fjord Formation	Triassic	Greenland
Fundy Group/Blomidon Formation	Triassic	Canada
Garita Creek Formation	Triassic	United States
Gartra Formation	Triassic	United States
Gondwana Group/Lower Maleri Formation	Triassic	India
Gondwana Group/Tiki Formation	Triassic	India
Gres à Avicula contorta Formation	Triassic	France
Huai Hin Lat Formation	Triassic	Thailand
Isalo Group/Isalo II or Makay Formation	Triassic	Madagascar
Isalo Group/upper Isalo II Formation	Triassic	Madagascar
Kuchinari Group/Huai Hin Lat Formation	Triassic	Thailand
Lias Group/Blue Lias Formation	Jurassic	United Kingdom
Löwenstein Formation	Triassic	Germany
Magnesian Conglomerate Formation	Triassic	United Kingdom
Middle Buntsandstein Formation	Triassic	Germany
Middle Keuper Group/Arnstadt Formation	Triassic	Germany
Middle Keuper Group/Hassberge Formation	Triassic	Germany
Middle Keuper Group/Knollenmergel Formation	Triassic	Switzerland
Middle Keuper Group/Löwenstein Formation	Triassic	Germany
Middle Keuper Group/Trossingen Formation	Triassic	Germany
Middle Keuper Group/Weser Formation	Triassic	Germany
Newark Group/Cumnock Formation	Triassic	United States
Newark Group/Lithofacies Association II Formation	Triassic	United States
Newark Group/Lockatong Formation	Triassic	United States
Newark Group/New Oxford Formation	Triassic	United States
Newark Group/Pekin Formation	Triassic	United States
Newark Group/Vinita Formation	Triassic	United States
Passaic Formation	Triassic	United States
Pekin Formation	Triassic	United States
Rosario do Sul Group/Caturrita Formation	Triassic	Brazil
Santa Rosa Formation	Triassic	United States
Sloan Canyon Formation	Triassic	United States
Steinmergel Formation	Triassic	Luxembourg
Stockton Formation	Triassic	United States
Tecovas Formation	Triassic	United States
Timezgadiouine Formation	Triassic	Morocco
Travesser Formation	Triassic	United States
Upper Keuper/Exter Formation	Triassic	Germany
Upper Keuper/Burgsandstein Formation	Triassic	Germany
Upper Keuper/Feuerletten Formation	Triassic	Germany
Zarzaïtine Group/Lower Zarzaïtine Formation	Triassic	Algeria
Zorzino Limestone Formation	Triassic	Italy
