= Triassic land vertebrate faunachrons =

Subdivisions of geological time

Land vertebrate faunachrons (LVFs) are biochronological units used to correlate and date terrestrial sediments and fossils based on their tetrapod faunas. First formulated on a global scale by Spencer G. Lucas in 1998, LVFs are primarily used within the Triassic Period (252 - 201 Ma), though Lucas later designated LVFs for other periods as well. Eight worldwide LVFs are defined for the Triassic. The first two earliest Triassic LVFs, the Lootsbergian and Nonesian, are based on South African synapsids and faunal assemblage zones estimated to correspond to the Early Triassic. These are followed by the Perovkan and Berdyankian, based on temnospondyl amphibians and Russian assemblages estimated to be from the Middle Triassic. The youngest four Triassic LVFs, the Otischalkian, Adamanian, Revueltian, and Apachean, are based on aetosaur and phytosaur reptiles common in the Late Triassic of the southwestern United States.

The LVF system, though widely used, is also a controversial application of biostratigraphy, as many Triassic tetrapods are rife with complications which endanger their utility as index fossils. Limited occurrences, inaccurate age estimates, overlapping LVF faunas, or taxonomic disagreement may jeopardize global correlations between Triassic tetrapods. This could render some LVFs as misleading assessments of Triassic faunal change through time. Regardless, Late Triassic phytosaurs are considered to have strong biostratigraphic utility even among detractors of Lucas's system.

== Lucas's LVFs ==
Tetrapod biostratigraphy has been used for the Triassic of South Africa since 1906 and Argentina since 1966, but without much connection to global faunas. Starting in 1993, New Mexico Museum of Natural History and Science paleontologist Spencer G. Lucas and his colleagues began to define tetrapod biostratigraphy intervals in the Triassic of China and eastern and western North America. These named biostratigraphic intervals were inspired by the Land Mammal Age (LMA) system already in use for Cenozoic faunal assemblages.

Triassic tetrapod biozones, under the term "land vertebrate faunachrons" (LVFs) were formalized on a global level by Lucas in 1998. They were diagnosed by a primary index fossil (a particular genus of widespread time-constrained tetrapod) and characterized by a faunal type assemblage (distinguishing collection of taxa) from a fossiliferous geological formation. Together, the defining index fossil and assemblage could be used to correlate fossil assemblages worldwide. Updates to this system have been published continuously for Triassic LVFs, which remain a heavily-discussed topic in the study of Triassic chronology. Lucas has also defined LVFs for the Permian, Jurassic, and Carboniferous, though these are not as widely used as his Triassic LVFs.

Later authors characterized Lucas's LVFs as "interval eubiochrons". This means that they correspond to a segment of time (and strata) between two paleobiological events: the first appearance datum (FAD) of one index taxon and the FAD of another. A first appearance datum is a point in the geological record with the earliest known fossil of a given animal, which can estimate when that animal speciates or evolves into existence. As an example, the Lootsbergian LVF is defined as the period of time between the FAD (estimated speciation) of Lystrosaurus and the FAD (estimated speciation) of Cynognathus. Some taxa which are index fossils for one stage may persist into a later stage.

=== List of Triassic LVFs ===
LVFs of the Triassic Period from youngest to oldest:

LVF name	Namesake	Primary index fossil	Other index fossils	Proposed age estimate (but see Criticism)	Type assemblage	Other correlated assemblages (but see Criticism)
Apachean	Apache Canyon, New Mexico, USA	Redondasaurus	Redondasuchus, Riojasaurus	late Norian to Rhaetian	Redonda Formation, New Mexico, USA	Rock Point Formation (Chinle Group, New Mexico, USA), Wingate Sandstone (Utah, USA), upper "Cliftonian" strata of the Newark Supergroup (eastern USA), Trossingen Formation (Germany / Switzerland), upper Arnstadt Formation (Germany), Los Colorados Formation? (Argentina), Quebrada del Barro Formation? (Argentina), Lower Elliot Formation? (South Africa), upper Mercia Mudstone Group? (UK), lower Penarth Group? (UK), Rhaetian fissure fills? (UK)
Revueltian	Revuelto Creek, New Mexico, USA	Typothorax coccinarum	Revueltosaurus, Aetosaurus, Rioarribasuchus, Pseudopalatus-grade phytosaurs, Eudimorphodon	early to middle Norian (but see below)	Bull Canyon Formation, New Mexico, USA	Painted Desert Member / Petrified Forest Formation (Chinle Group, Arizona / New Mexico, USA), Owl Rock Member (Chinle Formation, Arizona, USA), "Neshanician" and lower "Cliftonian" strata of the Newark Supergroup (eastern USA), Fleming Fjord Formation (Greenland), Stubensandstein (Germany), Lisowice (Poland), Calcare di Zorzino (Italy), Dolomia di Forni (Italy), lower Dharmaran Formation (India), Los Colorados Formation? (Argentina), Quebrada del Barro Formation? (Argentina), Lower Elliot Formation? (South Africa)
Adamanian	Adamana, Arizona, USA	Rutiodon-grade phytosaurs (including Leptosuchus and Smilosuchus)	Stagonolepis, Spinosuchus, Colognathus, Tecovasaurus, Crosbysaurus	late Carnian (but see below)	Blue Mesa Member, Chinle Formation, Arizona, USA	Bluewater Creek Formation (Chinle Group, New Mexico, USA), Santa Rosa Formation (New Mexico, USA), Garita Creek Formation (New Mexico, USA), Tecovas Formation (Texas, USA), "Conewagian" strata of the Newark Supergroup (eastern USA), Lossiemouth Sandstone (Scotland, UK), Krasiejów (Poland), Lehrberg Schichten / Blasensandstein / Kieselsandstein (Germany), DeGeerdalen Formation (Svalbard), Ischigualasto Formation (Argentina), upper Santa Maria Formation (Brazil), Caturrita Formation (Brazil), upper Maleri Formation (India), Isalo II (Madagascar)
Otischalkian	Otis Chalk, Texas, USA	Paleorhinus / Parasuchus	Metoposaurus, Placerias, Hyperodapedon, Doswellia, Angistorhinus, Longosuchus	middle Carnian	Colorado City Formation, Texas, USA	Popo Agie Formation (Wyoming, USA), Salitral Formation (New Mexico, USA), "Sanfordian" strata of the Newark Supergroup (eastern USA and Canada), Stuttgart Formation (Germany), Timezgadiouine Formation (Irohalene Member, Morocco), lower Maleri Formation (India), Tiki Formation (India), Madygen Formation? (Kyrgyzstan)
Berdyankian	Berdyanka River, Russia	Mastodonsaurus giganteus	Massetognathus, Dinodontosaurus, Stahleckeria	late Anisian to early Carnian	Bukobay Formation, Russia	Lower Keuper (Germany), Chañares Formation (Argentina), lower Santa Maria Formation (Brazil), upper Omingonde Formation (Namibia)
Perovkan	Perovka, Russia	Eocyclotosaurus	Eryosuchus, Paracyclotosaurus, Scalenodon, Shansiodon, Parakannemeyeria, Sinokannemeyeria, "Kannemeyeria cristarhynchus", Arizonasaurus	Anisian	Donguz Formation, Russia	Moenkopi Formation (Holbrook and Anton Chico members, USA), lower Wolfville Formation (Nova Scotia, Canada), Otter Sandstone (UK), Upper Buntsandstein (Germany / France), lower Kelamayi Formation (China), upper Ermaying Formation (China), Yerrapalli Formation (India), Cynognathus Assemblage Zone (Subzone C, South Africa), Omingonde Formation (Namibia), Manda Beds (Tanzania)
Nonesian	Nonesi's Nek Pass, South Africa	Cynognathus	Parotosuchus, Odenwaldia, Trematosaurus, Trematosuchus, Diademodon, Trirachodon, Kannemeyeria simocephalus, Erythrosuchus	Olenekian	Cynognathus Assemblage Zone (Subzones A-B), South Africa	Moenkopi Formation (Torrey and Wupatki members, USA), Sticky Keep Formation (Svalbard), Middle Buntsandstein (Germany), Yarenskian Gorizont (Russia), lower Ermaying Formation (China), Puesto Viejo Group (Argentina), Rio Mendoza Formation (Argentina), lower Zarzaïtine Formation (Algeria), lower Ntawere Formation (Zambia), Kingori Sandstone (Tanzania), upper Fremouw Formation (Antarctica)
Lootsbergian	Lootsberg Pass, South Africa	Lystrosaurus	Wetlugasaurus, Tupilakosaurus, Luzocephalus, Lydekkerina, Scaloposaurus, Thrinaxodon, Procolophon, Prolacerta, Proterosuchus	latest Permian (Changxingian) to Induan	Lystrosaurus Assemblage Zone, South Africa	upper Guodikeng Formation (China), lower Jiucaiyuan Formation (China), Heshanggou Formation (China), lower Fremouw Formation (Antarctica), Panchet Formation (India), Wordie Creek Formation (Greenland), Vokhmian Gorizont (Russia), Sludkian Gorizont (Russia), Ustmylian Gorizont (Russia), Sanga do Cabral Formation (Brazil), Rewan Formation (Australia), Arcadia Formation (Australia)

== Criticism ==
Several paleontologists have independently questioned the validity of Lucas’s system, criticizing its inconsistent and often contradictory approach to taxonomy and faunal correlations.

=== Endemic index taxa ===
Many index taxa are very rare or endemic to a single continent, and have no relevance to a global biostratigraphy system. These include Doswellia, Longosuchus, Typothorax, “Pseudopalatus” (Machaeroprosopus), Redondasaurus, and Redondasuchus, among others. For the Berdyankian LVF, very few species are shared between the index assemblage (the Bukobay Formation of Russia) and other correlated assemblages. Direct relationships between Russian, German, and South American dicynodonts are conjectural and based on undiagnostic European fragments.

=== Imprecise or inaccurate time scales ===
Triassic graphical timeline
← / Triassic–Jurassic extinction event; ← / Scleractinian corals & calcified sponges; ← / Carnian pluvial episode; ← / Manicouagan impact; ← / Coals return; ← / Full recovery of woody trees; ← / Smithian–Spathian boundary event; ← / Permian-Triassic extinction event
Subdivision of the Triassic according to the ICS, as of 2024. Vertical axis scale: Millions of years ago

Index taxa for a given LVF often range into the succeeding LVF, blurring the distinction between the two time periods. Angistorhinus, Hyperodapedon, Paleorhinus/Parasuchus (all Otischalkian index taxa) range into the Adamanian, fossils referred to Rutiodon (an Adamanian index taxon) range into the Revueltian, and Metoposaurus can be found throughout the Otischalkian, Apachian, and Revueltian LVFs.

Lucas's approach to correlating LVFs with global marine stages has been met with criticism. The Triassic timescale is under constant revision from a series of age dating methods, including magnetostratigraphy, cyclostratigraphy, radiometric dating, and biozones of marine invertebrates such as conodonts and ammonoids. However, there are only a few areas where fossils of Triassic land tetrapods and marine organisms overlap, mostly restricted to coastal sediments in central Europe. Palynomorph and conchostracan biozones can help correlate terrestrial strata to an extent. One complication is that Lucas's view of the Late Triassic time scale contradicts the consensus established by other biostratigraphers. Most paleontologists estimate that the three stages of the Late Triassic (Carnian, Norian, and Rhaetian) are strongly unequal in size, with the Norian far longer than the Carnian. Under this consensus "long-Norian" hypothesis, the Carnian-Norian boundary is close to 228 Ma. Lucas, on the other hand, prefers a "short-Norian" perspective, with a lengthier Carnian stage and a Carnian-Norian boundary at around 220 Ma.

For example, Lucas has maintained that the lower part of the Chinle Formation (the Blue Mesa Member and equivalent units) is Carnian (>220 Ma) in age. This was justified by the assumption that fossils of Stagonolepis, a European aetosaur, can be found in North and South America, allowing correlation between these regions. However, this proposed widespread occurrence of Stagonolepis is a debatable, as many species assigned to the genus may not be closely related (see below).

According to the "short-Norian" interpretation, these lower Chinle Formation, and other strata of the Adamanian LVF, would be firmly pre-Norian in age, suggesting that any taxonomic change between the Adamanian and Revueltian represents a Carnian-Norian extinction event. However, the consensus "long-Norian" interpretation firmly places Adamanian strata of North America into the Norian stage (<228 Ma). The Norian age of the lower Chinle Formation has been independently confirmed by U-Pb dating and magnetostratigraphic correlations to global time scales. Conversely, other "Adamanian" strata, such as fossiliferous layers in the lower Ischigualasto Formation of Argentina, can be assigned to the late Carnian (~231 Ma). This supports the conclusion that LVFs such as the Adamanian are fraught with uncertain time estimates brought on by weak correlations on a global scale.

Some authors have elected to ignore LVFs in favor of older and more localized biostratigraphic units. Named tetrapod assemblages zones (AZs) were well-established for the Triassic of Gondwana prior to the LVF, and recent updates have helped to constrain these units with greater clarity and agreement than global correlations. In Argentina, Bonaparte (1966) established the Chanarian (named after the Chañares Formation) and the Ischigualastian (named after the Ischigualasto Formation). Equivalents faunas are easily traced across Brazil, Africa, and India. These two biostratigraphic zones correlate with Lucas's Berdyankian, Otischalkian, and Apachean LVFs, but do not precisely overlap in time with those LVFs. Moreover, aetosaurs and phytosaurs, which are common in the Northern Hemisphere, are rarer and more scattered in the Southern Hemisphere. As a result, Gondwanan assemblage zones are defined by more common Southern taxa. For example, the Ischigualastian zone is defined by the rhynchosaur Hyperodapedon and the cynodont Exaeretodon, as well as the aetosaur Aetosauroides and herrerasaurid dinosaurs.

=== Taxonomic uncertainty and dubious correlations ===
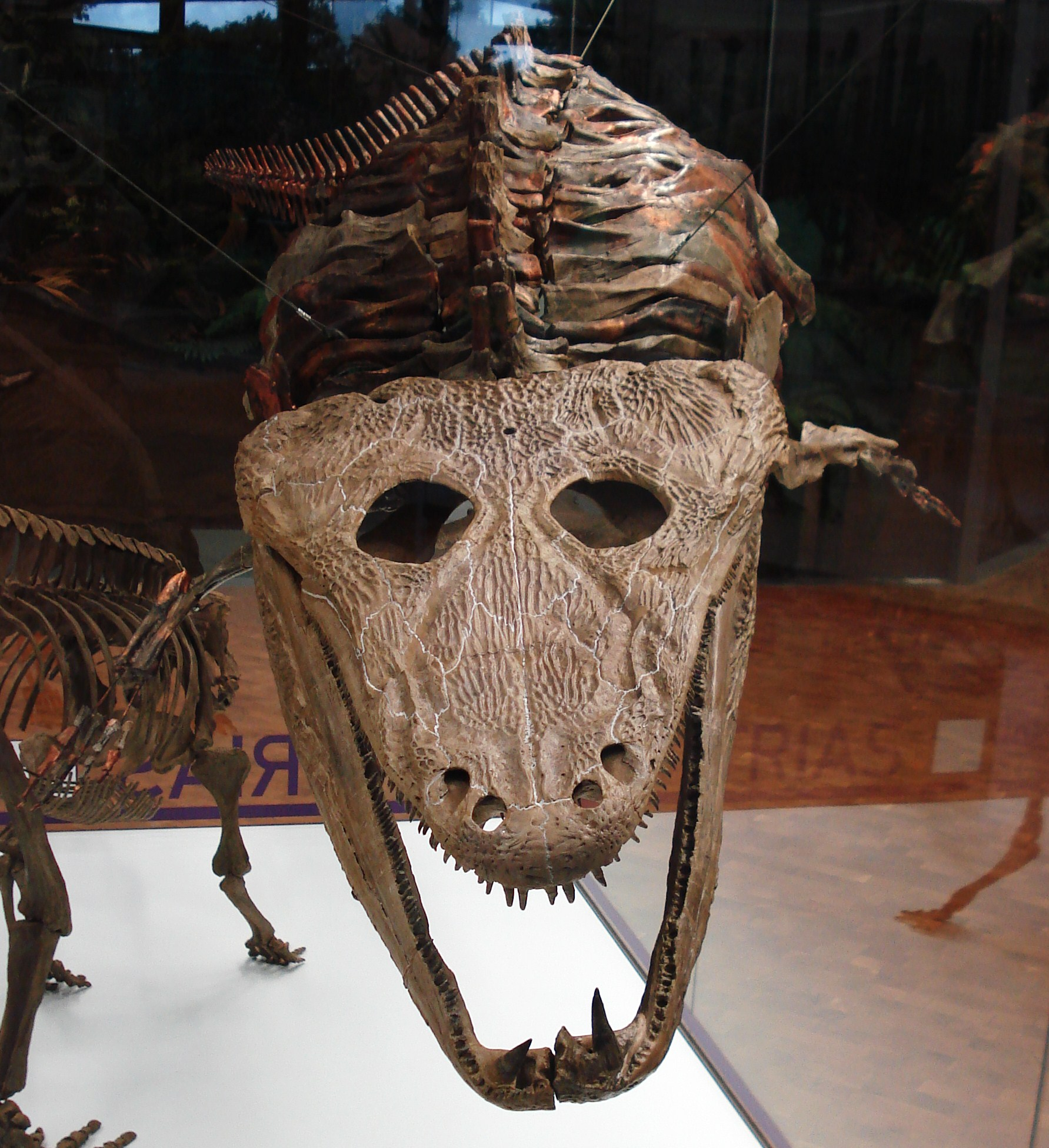
Mastodonsaurus, a purported index fossil of the Berdyankian LVF

Some correlations are based on connections between fragmentary or poorly-constrained taxa rather than direct correlations between type assemblages or LVF-defining index taxa. For example, the Ermaying Formation of China is correlated with the Moenkopi Formation of the United States via a tenuous (and likely unjustifiable) comparison between proposed erythrosuchid fossils. The primary index fossil of the Perovkan LVF, Eocyclotosaurus, is absent from China.

One particularly contradictory index fossil is Mastodonsaurus, the defining index fossil of the Berdyankian LVF. Fossils referable to this genus can be found across Ladinian-age Europe, but the proposed Russian species (M. torvus) may be unrelated to the endemic German type species (M. giganteus). Moreover, if one approaches Mastodonsaurus from a broader taxonomic perspective (as expected if M. torvus is included), they must also incorporate Anisian and Carnian material referred to the genus, including the small species “Heptasaurus” cappelensis. This precludes any reason to use Mastodonsaurus as a time-constrained index taxon.

Some LVFs are based on evolutionary grades as index taxa. This ignores the potential for high diversity and long temporal ranges within a given grade, and may lead to arbitrary and subjective inclusion or exclusion of descendant taxa. “Stagonolepis”, in its broadest form, is a wastebasket taxon of basal aetosaurs ranging through the Otischalkian and Apachean. Lucas’s usage of Stagonolepis lumps in many genera separated by other authors, such as Aetosauroides and Calyptosuchus. A similar situation occurs in Paleorhinus/Parasuchus, which has historically been used as a persistent grade of early phytosaurs. On the other hand, the characteristic phytosaur (Redondasaurus) and aetosaur (Redondasaurus) genera of the Apachean LVF are very similar to, and perhaps synonymous with, index taxa of the underlying Revueltian LVF: “Pseudopalatus” (Machaeroprosopus) and Typothorax, respectively.

== Martz & Parker (2017) revision ==
Although the utility of a global LVF system is questionable, LVF-derived biostratigraphy may be useful in limited circumstances. Phytosaurs in particular have played a large role in the tetrapod biostratigraphy of the Chinle and Dockum Group of the southwest United States. A revision of the LVF system in this narrow context was undertaken by Jeff Martz and Bill Parker (2017), retaining several names and concepts previously used by Lucas and colleagues.

Martz and Parker argued that the term "faunachron" was misleading and redundant, as each "faunachron" is bound by a single taxon rather than an assemblage (fauna) of multiple taxa. They preferred using a specific type of interval biozone known as a teilzone, referring to a local interval of strata equivalent to an interval of time. The base of each teilzone was marked by the Lowest known Occurrence (LOk) of a particular category of phytosaur, i.e. the oldest layer where fossils of that category are found in the study area. LOks are local points in time and stratigraphy, disregarding occurrences in other regions or the estimated time of speciation. For the Otischalkian, Adamanian, and Revueltian, the top of each teilzone is marked by the LOk of a more exclusive subgroup of phytosaurs. The top of the Apachean is marked by the LOk of Protosuchus, an Early Jurassic crocodylomorph, as with Lucas's system.

"Faunachrons" could also be defined beyond the constraints of teilzones; other biozonation categories include holochronozones (a stratigraphic interval, involving multiple study areas) and holochrons (an estimated time interval, involving the time of speciation or immigration into the region). Each phytosaur-based "faunachron" could be considered a teilzone (in local biostratigraphy), an estimated holochronozone (in regional chronostratigraphy), or an estimated holochron (in regional biochronology).

One complication in defining biozones based on phytosaurs is instability in phytosaur systematics. Many proposed phytosaur taxa are dubious, paraphyletic (such as Leptosuchus and Machaeroprosopus) or have unclear relationships to each other. Nevertheless, a series of nested clades is apparent in most recent overviews. Rather than relying on a single index taxon per biozone, Martz and Parker allowed multiple representatives per a given stage of phytosaur evolution. These representatives were chosen based on their occurrence in the southwest United States, commonness, and relatively stable phylogenetic position despite paraphyly in some circumstances.

Name	Base-defining event	Representative phytosaurs	Estimated age	Included Chinle units	Included Dockum units
Apachean	LOk of "Redondasaurus"	"Redondasaurus" (subgenus of Machaeroprosopus?)	Rhaetian (207-202 Ma)	Rock Point Member; Church Rock Member; "siltstone member”; Owl Rock Member (in part)	Redonda Formation
Revueltian	LOk of Pseudopalatinae (= Mystriosuchini)	Machaeroprosopus (sensu lato)	middle to late Norian (Alaunian to Sevatian, 215-207 Ma)	lower Owl Rock Member?; Petrified Forest (Painted Desert) Member; lower Kane Springs beds?; upper Sonsela Member	lowermost Redonda Formation; middle to upper Cooper Canyon Formation (including "Bull Canyon Formation"); upper Trujillo Formation
Adamanian	LOk of Leptosuchomorpha	Smilosuchus, Leptosuchus, "Phytosaurus" doughtyi	early to middle Norian (Lacian to early Alaunian, 224-215 Ma)	lower Sonsela Member; Blue Mesa Member; Cameron Member	lower to middle Cooper Canyon Formation; lower Trujillo Formation; lower to middle Tecovas Formation; Garita Creek Formation
Otischalkian	LOk of Phytosauria	Wannia, Parasuchus (Paleorhinus) bransoni	earliest Norian (earliest Lacian, 227-224 Ma)	lowermost Blue Mesa Member; lowermost Cameron Member; Shinarump Member; Mesa Redondo Member	lowermost Cooper Canyon Formation; lowermost Tecovas Formation; lowermost Garita Creek Formation; Colorado City Member; Camp Springs Conglomerate; Santa Rosa Formation

=== Adamanian-Revueltian turnover ===
Although most LVFs or equivalent concepts are not marked by major biotic changes, one exception is apparent in the southwest United States. The boundary between the Adamanian and Revueltian zones is marked by a faunal turnover, an event where several tetrapod species quickly disappear from the fossil record as others appear for the first time. At Petrified Forest National Park, the event occurs in the Jim Camp Wash beds. This sediment layer is positioned in the middle of the Chinle Formation's Sonsela Member, and would have been deposited around 215 million years ago. Trilophosaurus, Poposaurus, Desmatosuchus, dicynodonts, and non-mystriosuchin phytosaurs are extirpated from the area around this time, while metoposaurs and allokotosaurs as a whole decline in abundance. New species of aetosaurs and phytosaurs replaced losses across the purported boundary event. Palynomorph assemblages overturn to more dry adapted species, and a higher concentration of pedogenic carbonate nodules may also support increasing aridity.

The cause and relevance of this turnover is debatable, as it may indicate only a small localized extinction. The Manicouagan Impact, the second-largest bolide impact of the Mesozoic Era (besides the Chicxulub Impact which caused the K-Pg Mass Extinction at 66 Ma), is dated to around 215.4 Ma. While certainly large enough to momentarily devastate areas near the impact point in Quebec, broader environmental effects of the Manicouagan impact are mostly conjectural. Besides the Adamanian-Revueltian turnover, the impact has also been linked to a minor marine extinction in eastern Panthalassa.

Alternatively, the Adamanian-Revueltian turnover may be a consequence of the gradual aridification of western Pangea as it drifted north into arid latitudes. Comparative estimates of extinction rates and occurrences find little support for a synchronized Adamanian-Revueltian turnover, and instead support a model where extinctions are stretched out over several million years. For most species, extinction probabilities are "decoupled" in time from other species, as well as geological or climatological drivers. The only plausible correlation is between the Manicouagan Impact and palynomorph turnover, and even then the probability of synchronicity is only about 34%.
