= Protoavis =

Protoavis Temporal range: Late Triassic, 210 Ma
- Protoavis texensis paratype (TTU P 9201)

Scientific classification
- Kingdom: Animalia
- Phylum: Chordata
- Class: Reptilia
- Clade: Neodiapsida
- Clade: incertae sedis
- Genus: †Protoavis

Type species
- †Protoavis texensis Chatterjee, 1991

Extinct genus of reptiles

Protoavis (meaning "first bird") is a problematic taxon of dinosaurs or reptiles known from fragmentary remains from Late Triassic Norian stage deposits near Post, Texas. The animal's true classification has been the subject of much controversy, and there are many different interpretations of what the taxon actually is. When it was first described, the fossils were described as being from a primitive bird which, if the identification is valid, would push back avian origins some 60–75 million years.

The original describer of Protoavis texensis, Sankar Chatterjee of Texas Tech University, interpreted the type specimen to have come from a single animal, specifically a 35 cm tall bird that lived in what is now Texas, USA, around 210 million years ago. Though it existed far earlier than Archaeopteryx, its skeletal structure is more bird-like. Protoavis has been reconstructed as a carnivorous bird that had teeth on the tip of its jaws and eyes located at the front of the skull, suggesting a nocturnal or crepuscular lifestyle. Reconstructions usually depict it with feathers, as Chatterjee originally interpreted structures on the arm to be quill knobs, the attachment point for flight feathers found in some modern birds and non-avian dinosaurs. However, re-evaluation of the fossil material by subsequent authors such as Lawrence Witmer have been inconclusive regarding whether or not these structures are actual quill knobs.

However, this description of Protoavis assumes that Protoavis has been correctly interpreted as a bird. Many palaeontologists doubt that Protoavis is a bird, or that all remains assigned to it even come from a single species, because of the circumstances of its discovery and unconvincing avian synapomorphies in its fragmentary material. When they were found at the Tecovas and Bull Canyon Formations in the Texas panhandle in 1973, in a sedimentary strata of a Triassic river delta, the fossils were a jumbled cache of disarticulated bones that may reflect an incident of mass mortality following a flash flood.

== Description ==
Protoavis is usually depicted as being a bipedal archosaur, similar to several poposaurids and rauisuchids that lived during roughly the same time as Protoavis. In a description published by Sankar Chatterjee, structures were identified as quill knobs, although there has been debate as to whether these are actually quill knobs or not.

=== Skull and braincase ===
The braincase of Protoavis is similar in some respects to Troodon, with an enlarged cerebellum that shifted the optic lobes ventrolaterally, and also has a large floccular lobe. The inner ear is also pretty similar and bird-like in both taxa. The canalicular systems and the cochlear process differ in both taxa, and the vestibular region is relatively small and located in a ventral position to most of the anterior and posterior semicircular canals. The anterior semicircular canal is significantly longer than the others, and the cochlear process is a relatively long, vertically oriented tube. However, Protoavis is also remarkedly non-bird like in that it possess only a single exit for the trigeminal. However, these characters are not robust enough to identify Protoavis as a bird.

The skull has an extremely narrow parietal with block like dorsal aspect, very broad, T-shaped frontals that form the "lateral wings" that Chatterjee applies to the lack of postorbitals. There are short curved ulnae with olecranon processes, and a possible scapula with bent shaft, and the cervicals have profiles and aspects to their exterior that are very similar to the Megalancosaurus cervical series. All the cervicals but the most posterior and axis/atlas have hypapophyses and those triangular neural spines; all characteristics that have been described in Megalancosaurus. (Note: Specifically, the type specimen has these features, and they are corroborated in other specimens, including a complete, articulated neck with dorsal series, pectoral girdle, and forelimb.) This suggests that portions of Protoavis may be drepanosaurid in nature.

Chatterjee presents the skull of Protoavis as complete, although only the caudal aspect of the cranium is represented in the available fossils. Chatterjee argues that the temporal region displays a streptostylic quadrate with orbital process for attachment of the M. protractor pterygoidei et quadrati, with associated confluence of the orbits with the temporal fenestrae, thus facilitating prokinesis. He further asserts that the braincase of Protoavis bears a number of characters seen in Ornithurae, including the structure of the otic capsule, the widespread pneumatization of the braincase elements, a full complement of tympanic recesses, and the presence of an epiotic.

Of this material, only the quadrate and orbital roof, in addition to limited portions of the braincase are preserved with enough fidelity to permit any definitive interpretation. The quadrates of TTU P 9200 and TTU P 9201 are not particularly alike; a fact not easily explained away if the material is conspecific, as Chatterjee insists. There does not appear to be an orbital process present on either bone, and the modifications of the proximal condyle permitting wide range of motion against the squamosal, are not readily apparent. Furthermore, the quadratojugal and jugal appear far more robust in the Protoavis specimens themselves, than represented by Chatterjee. The size and development of the quadratojugal seems to contradict Chatterjee's assertion that this bone contacted the quadrate via a highly mobile pin joint. These data render the assertion of prokinesis in the skull of Protoavis questionable at best, and it seems most parsimonious to conclude that the specimen displays a conventional opisthostylic quadrate.

The braincase is where Protoavis comes close to being as avian as Chatterjee has maintained. The otic capsule is allegedly organized in avian fashion, with three distinct foramina arranged as such: fenestra ovalis, fenestra pseudorotunda, and the caudal tympanic recess, with a bony metotic strut positioned between the fenestra pseudorotunda and caudal tympanic recess. The claim that the full complement of tympanic recesses seen in ornithurines, are similarly observed in Protoavis is questionable, as the preservation of the braincase is not adequate to permit concrete observations on the matter. Chatterjee omits in his 1987 account of the braincase, the presence of a substantial post-temporal fenestra, which in all Aves (including Archaeopteryx), is reduced or absent altogether, and the lack of a pneumatic sinus on the paroccipital. Furthermore, the braincase possesses multiple characters symplesiomorphic of Coelurosauria, including an expanded cerebellar auricular fossa, and a vagal canal opening into the occiput. What is preserved of the preorbital skull lacks apomorphic characters to be expected in a specimen, which is allegedly more closely allied to Pygostylia than is Archaeopteryx lithographica. Most telling is the complete absence of accessory fenestrae in the antorbital fossa, leading to maxillary sinuses.

=== Post-cranial anatomy ===
The post-cranial remains are as badly preserved, or worse, than the cranial elements, and their interpretation by Chatterjee are in many cases unsubstantiated or speculative. Of the postcranial skeleton, Chatterjee has isolated the axial skeleton as displaying a suite of avian characters, including heterocoelous centra, hypapophyses and reduction of the neural spines. First and foremost, the preservation quality of the vertebrae is poor. While the centra are modified, they do not appear to be truly heterocoelous. The presence of incipient hypapophyses in and of itself might be considered indicative of avian affinity, but their poor development and presence on vertebrae otherwise thoroughly non-avian, is most parsimoniously regarded as mild convergence until further material should be brought to light. The reduction of the neural spines is questionable.

Curiously, Gregory Paul has noted that the cervicals of Protoavis and drepanosaurs are astonishingly similar, such they are hardly distinguishable from one another. Considering the modification of the drepanosaur neck for the purposes of snap-action predation, it becomes more likely that superficial similarities in the cervicals of both taxa are in fact only convergent with Aves. Chatterjee does not identify the remaining vertebrae as particularly avian in their osteology.

==== Pectoral girdle ====
The pectoral girdle is discussed by Chatterjee as being highly derived in Protoavis, displaying synapomorphies of avialans more derived than Archaeopteryx, including the presence of a hypocleidium-bearing furcula, and a hypertrophied, carinate sternum. Chatterjee's interpretation of the fossils identified as such in his reviews of the Protoavis material are open to question due to the preservation quality of the elements and as of this time, it is not clear whether either character was in fact present in Protoavis. The glenoid appears to be oriented dorsolaterally permitting a wide range of humeral movement. Chatterjee implies that this is a highly derived trait which allies Protoavis to Aves, but why this should be so is not clearly discussed in the descriptions of the animal. In and of itself, the orientation of the glenoid is not a sufficient basis for placing Protoavis within Aves. The scapular blade is far broader than illustrated by Chatterjee in his 1997 account, and not particularly avian in its gross form. The coracoid, identified by Chatterjee as strut-like and retroverted, is, like the supposed furcula and sternum, too poorly preserved to permit accurate identification. Moreover, the original spatial relationship of the alleged coracoid to the scapula is entirely unknown. Uncinate processes and sternal ribs are missing.

==== Pelvic girdle ====
Chatterjee asserts that the pelvic girdle is apomorphic comparative to archaic birds and displays a retroverted pubis, fusion of the ischium and ilium, an antitrochanter, and the presence of a renal fossa. The pubis does appear to display opisthopuby, although this has yet to be verified. The alleged fusion of the ischium and ilium into an ilioischiadic plate is currently not substantiated by the fossils at hand, despite Chatterjee's auspicious illustration to the contrary in The Rise of Birds. At this time the pelvic girdle is not sufficiently well preserved to ascertain whether or not a renal fossa was present, although as no known avian from the Mesozoic displays a renal fossa, it is not clear why Protoavis should, even if it is more derived than Archaeopteryx. Similarly, it is unclear if the alleged antitrochanter has been correctly identified as such.

==== Arms and legs ====
The manus and carpus are among the few areas of the Protoavis material which are well preserved, and they are astonishingly non-avian. The distal carpals, while long, are in no way similar to those observed in the urvogel or other archaic birds. There is no semilunate element, and the structure of the radiale and ulnare would have limited the flexibility of the wrist joint. The manus is not tridactyl, and metacarpal V is present. In even the most basal avialian, Archaeopteryx, there is no vestige of the fifth metacarpal and its presence in Protoavis seems incongruous with the claim that it is a bird, let alone one more derived than Archaeopteryx.

Chatterjee claims that the humerus of Protoavis is "remarkably avian", but as in all matters with the fossils referred to this taxon, accurate identification of the elaborate trochanters, ridges, etc., attributed to the humerus by Chatterjee is impossible at this time. The expanded distal condyles, which appear to be present in the humerus of Protoavis and enlarged deltopectoral crest (a ridge for the attachment of chest and shoulder muscles), are congruent with the morphology of ceratosaur humeri, as is the apparent presence of a distal brachial depression.

The femur of Protoavis is astonishingly similar to non-tetanurans, namely coelophysoids. The proximal femur displays a trochanteric shelf caudal to the lesser and greater trochanters, a feature distinguishing non-tetanurans theropods from Tetanurae. Further similarities between the proximal humerus of Protoavis and that of non-tetanuran theropods are found in the shared presence of an enlarged obturator ridge, whose morphology in Protoavis is again, uncannily like that observed in robust basal theropods, e.g., "Syntarus" kayentakatae. The resemblance between the femur of Protoavis and that of a non-tetanuran theropod becomes ever more pronounced at the distal end of the bone. Both share a crista tibiofibularis groove, a feature of a non-tetanuran theropod separating the medial and lateral condyles.

The tibia of Protoavis allegedly possesses both a lateral and cranial cnemial crest, though the validity of this claim is subject to question due to the preservation quality of the material. The fibula is continuous to the astragalocalcaneal unit. A tibiotarsus is absent, unusual considering Chatterjee's claims for the pygostylian affinity of Protoavis, as is a tarsometatarsus. The ascending process of the astragalus is reduced, a character entirely incongruous with a highly derived status for Protoavis. Curiously, such abbreviation of the ascending process is found in ceratosaurs, and in its general osteology, the Protoavis tarsus and pes, is quite similar to those of non-tetanuran theropods. Chatterjee's restoration of the hallux as reversed is nothing more than speculation, as the original spatial relationships of the pedal elements are impossible to ascertain at this time.

==== Quill knobs ====
Reconstructions usually depict Protoavis with feathers, as Chatterjee originally interpreted structures on the arm to be quill knobs, the attachment point for flight feathers found in some modern birds and non-avian dinosaurs. However, re-evaluation of the fossil material by subsequent authors such as Lawrence Witmer have been inconclusive regarding whether or not these structures are actual quill knobs.

In his 1997 account, Chatterjee infers the presence of feathers from alleged quill knobs on the badly smashed ulna and metacarpals III and IV, and infers the presence of remiges from such structures (though he does caution that this is uncertain). As is the case with the alleged quill knobs on the ulna, the metacarpal structures appear to be attributable to post-mortem damage. Moreover, the thumb, unlike the case in all birds, is not medially divergent. Considering how poorly preserved the ulna is, it is entirely premature to make any definitive conclusions as to the presence of quill knobs until such time as more adequate material becomes available. Upon further examination of the material no structures were isolated that could be deemed as homologous to remigial papillae.

== Classification and taxonomy ==
The taxonomy of Protoavis is controversial, with very few palaeornithologists considering it to be an early ancestor of modern birds, and most others in the palaeontological community regard it as a chimaera, a mixture of several specimens. American palaeontologist Gregory Paul suggested that Protoavis is a herrerasaur. In a paper by Phil Currie and X.J. Zhao discussing a braincase of a Troodon formosus, they compared the bird-like characters of Troodon and Protoavis. In the paper, they made a number of corrections involving both Chatterjee's and Currie's own misinterpretations of parts of Troodon cranial anatomy before the particular braincase being described was found. At least a couple of the corrections (the anterior tympanic recess, and the relatively kinetic quadrate-squamosal contact) made Troodon more bird-like than Chatterjee made out in his Protoavis paper, but overall these particular corrections seemed to have little bearing on the avian features of Protoavis. Currie and Zhao did not explicitly state whether or not they considered Protoavis to be a theropod, however they suggested that although Protoavis has characters suggesting avian affinities, most of these are also found in theropod dinosaurs.

=== Protoavis is a bird ===
The most remarkable thing about Protoavis is that, although it predates Archaeopteryx by 75 million years, it is considerably more advanced than Archaeopteryx...Protoavis is more closely related to modern birds than is Archaeopteryx.

— Sankar Chatterjee

Sankar Chatterjee and a few other palaeornithologists claimed that this material documents a Triassic origin of birds and the presence of a bird more advanced than Archaeopteryx. Though it existed approximately 75 million years before the oldest known bird, its skeletal structure is allegedly more bird-like. Protoavis has been reconstructed as a carnivorous bird that had teeth on the tip of its jaws and eyes located at the front of the skull, suggesting a nocturnal or crepuscular lifestyle. The fossil bones are too badly preserved to allow an estimate of flying ability; although reconstructions usually show feathers, judging from thorough study of the fossil material there is no indication that these were present.

However, this description of Protoavis assumes that Protoavis has been correctly interpreted as a bird. Almost all palaeontologists doubt that Protoavis is a bird, or that all remains assigned to it even come from a single species, because of the circumstances of its discovery and weak avialan synapomorphies in its fragmentary material. When they were found at a Dockum Group quarry in the Texas panhandle in 1984, in a sedimentary stratum of a Triassic river delta, the fossils were a jumbled cache of disarticulated bones reflecting an incident of mass mortality following a flash flood.

=== Protoavis is a chimaera ===
Except for a few elements, the available material of Protoavis is extremely fragmentary. Chatterjee's interpretations of certain bones are questionable, and even the association of elements into specimens and then into a single taxon seems difficult to support.

— Luis Chiappe

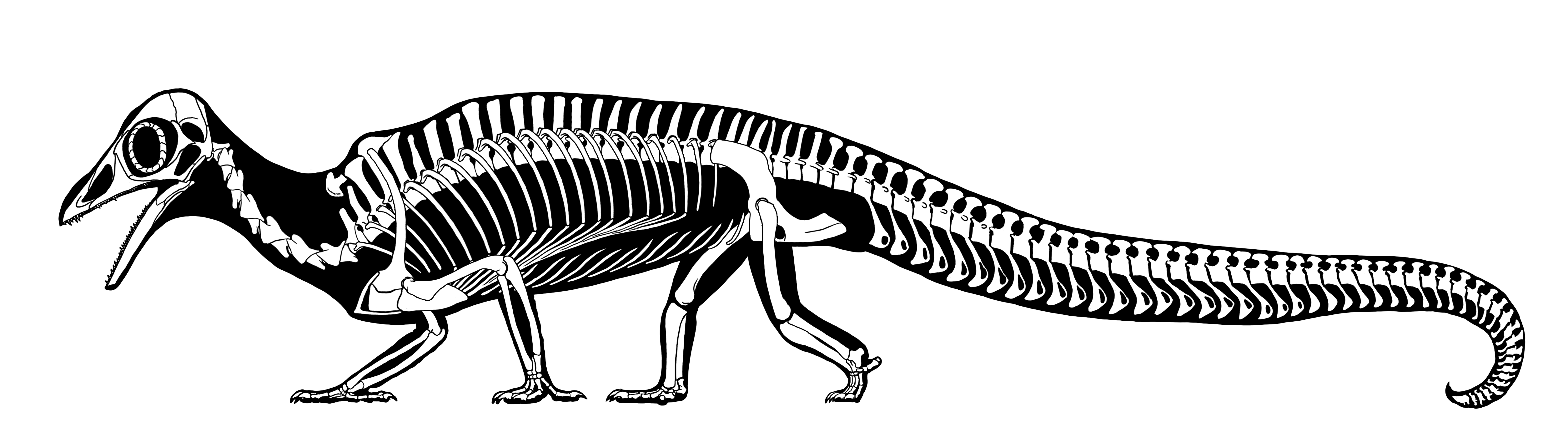
Skeletal diagram of a drepanosaurid, a type of Triassic reptile that some of the Protoavis bones may belong to

Chatterjee was convinced that some of these crushed bones belonged to two individuals – one old, one young – of the same species. However, only a few parts were found, primarily a skull and some limb bones which moreover do not well agree in their proportions respective to each other, and this has led many to believe that the Protoavis fossil is chimaeric, made up of more than one organism: the pieces of skull appear like those of a coelurosaur, while the femur and ankle bone catalogued under TTU P-9200 and TTU P-9201 respectively suggest affinities to non-tetanuran theropods and at least some vertebrae are most similar to those of Megalancosaurus, a drepanosaurid. However, those supposed similarities between the cervicals of Protoavis and drepanosaurids were the same similarities that Feduccia and Wild (1993) used to argue for an affinity between Archaeopteryx and drepanosaurids.

"Everywhere one turns; the very fossils ascribed thereto challenge the validity of Protoavis. The most parsimonious conclusion to be inferred from these data is that Chatterjee's contentious find is nothing more than a chimera, a morass of long-dead archosaurs."

If it really is a single animal and not a chimera, Protoavis would raise questions about when birds began to diverge from other theropods, if they are a lineage of theropod dinosaurs at all, but until better evidence is produced, the animal's status currently remains uncertain. Furthermore, paleobiogeography suggests that true birds did not colonize the Americas until the Cretaceous; the most primitive undisputed bird-like maniraptorans found to date are all Eurasian. Certainly, the fossils are most parsimoniously attributed to primitive dinosaurian and other reptiles as outlined above. However, coelurosaurs and ceratosaurs are in any case not too distantly related to the ancestors of birds and in some aspects of the skeleton not unlike them, explaining how their fossils could be mistaken as avian. Palaeontologist Zhonghe Zhou stated:

"[Protoavis] has neither been widely accepted nor seriously considered as a Triassic bird ... [Witmer], who has examined the material and is one of the few workers to have seriously considered Chatterjee's proposal, argued that the avian status of P. texensis is probably not as clear as generally portrayed by Chatterjee, and further recommended minimization of the role that Protoavis plays in the discussion of avian ancestry."

Welman has argued that the quadrate of Protoavis displays synapomorphies of Theropoda. Paul has demonstrated the drepanosaur affinities of the cervical vertebrae. Gauthier & Rowe, and Dingus & Rowe have argued convincingly for identifying the hind limb of Protoavis as belonging to a ceratosaur. Feduccia has argued that Protoavis represents an arboreal "thecodont". In a study of early ornithischian dinosaurs, Sterling Nesbitt and others determined some of the partial remains of Protoavis to be a non-tetanuran theropod. The entire skull and neck are considered to be most likely from a drepanosaurid because the skull and neck are too big compared to the dorsal vertebrae of Protoavis. (Note: Features present in the remains of Protoavis that indicate that it is not a bird or more derived than Archaeopteryx include: 1. The cranium appears to lack accessory fenestrae enclosed within the antorbital fossa, leading to auxiliary maxillary sinuses.; 2. The braincase displays a large post-temporal foramen.; 3. A pneumatopore leading to a pneumatic sinus is not present on the paroccipital process.; 4. The quadrate lacks an orbital process, doubled proximal condyle, and pin-joint with the quadratojugal.; 5. The vertebral centra are only mildly heterocoelous.; 6. Uncinate processes and sternal ribs absent.; 7. Carpus lacks a semilunate element.; 8. Carpometacarpus absent.; 9. Fifth metacarpal retained.; 10. Manus not tridactyl.; 11. Thumb is not medially divergent.; 12. Tibiotarsus absent.; 13. Pygostyle absent, tail elongate.)

=== In discussions of evolution ===
Scientists such as Alan Feduccia have cited Protoavis in an attempt to refute the hypothesis that birds evolved from dinosaurs. However, some scientists have claimed the only consequence would be to push the point of bird divergence further back in time. At the time when such claims were originally made, the affiliation of birds and maniraptoran theropods which today is well-supported and generally accepted by most ornithologists was much more contentious; most Mesozoic birds have only been discovered since then. Chatterjee himself has since used Protoavis to support a close relationship between dinosaurs and birds.

"As there remains no compelling data to support the avian status of Protoavis or taxonomic validity thereof, it seems mystifying that the matter should be so contentious. The author very much agrees with Chiappe in arguing that at present, Protoavis is irrelevant to the phylogenetic reconstruction of Aves. While further material from the Dockum beds may vindicate this peculiar archosaur, for the time being, the case for Protoavis is non-existent."

=== Phylogenetic implications ===
It has been argued that if valid, Protoavis will represent the death knell to the theropod descent of birds. Palaeontologists counter that if valid, Protoavis in no way falsifies the theropod origin of birds. The very fact that Chatterjee used his putative bird to defend theropod origins for birds seems to contradict the argument of Alan Feduccia that a true bird from the Triassic would bring about the collapse of the theropod "dogma".

== Discovery and history ==
Smushed and mashed and broken.

— Jacques Gauthier informally describing the holotype specimen.

Archosaur discoveries are comparatively abundant in Texas, and have been recovered in some quantity since E. D. Cope worked the redbeds of the panhandle over a century ago. The holotype specimen of Protoavis (TTU P 9200), the paratype (TTU P 9201), and all referred materials, (Note: Chatterjee (1995) describes these Protoavis specimens in addition to the description of the skeletons referred to TTU P 9200 and TTU P 9201. They are: (TTU P 9350-9355) six dorsal vertebrae (6–10 mm); (TTU P 9356-9359) four caudal vertebrae (8–9 mm); (TTU P 9360) coracoid(?) (14 mm); (TTU P 9361) sternum(?) (25 mm); (TTU P 9362) humerus (~80 mm); (TTU P 9263) humerus; (TTU P 9364) partial mandible; (TTU P 9365) humerus; (TTU P 9370) femur (~58 mm); (TTU P 9372) femur; (TTU P 9373) femur; (TTU P 9374) tibia; (TTU P 9375-9380) phalanges) were discovered in the Dockum Group, from the panhandle of Texas. The Dockum dates from the Carnian through the early Norian, in the terminal Triassic and is composed of four units of decreasing age: the Santa Rose Formation, the Tecovas Formation, the Trujillo Formation, the Cooper Canyon Formation, and the Bull Canyon Formation. Many skeletal elements and partial elements of Protoavis were collected from the Post (Miller) Quarry of the Bull Canyon Formation in the 1980s and other specimens referred to Protoavis were collected from the underlying Kirkpatrick Quarry of the Tecovas Formation. The specimens altogether consists of a partial skull and postcranial remains belonging to possibly several large individuals. The bones were completely freed of the surrounding matrix, and some were heavily reconstructed and the identification of some of the elements have been questioned by other palaeornithologists and palaeontologists.

The type material was collected from mudstone deposits in June 1973 and initially identified as a juvenile Coelophysis bauri. The level of the Dockum group from which the Protoavis material was recovered, was most likely deposited in a deltaic river system. The bone bed excavated by Sankar Chatterjee and his students of Texas Tech University, in which Protoavis was discovered, likely reflects an incident of mass mortality following a flash flood. Chatterjee, who first described Protoavis, has assigned the binomial Protoavis texensis ("first bird from Texas") to the small cache of bones, allegedly conspecific. He interpreted the type specimen to have come from a single animal, specifically a 35 cm tall bird that lived in what is now Texas, USA, between 225 and 210 million years ago.

Due to the nature of the bones being jumbled into sandstone nodules, and completely disarticulated, it has been suggested that Protoavis was reworked from later sediments. However, a basic stratigraphic principle, the "principle of inclusions", is a special case of the principle of cross-cutting relationships. It states that rock has to exist before it can be included in other sedimentary rock. Reworking is the process of weathering fossils or rock containing fossils out of rocks already present, transporting them, and redepositing them in sediments which are later lithified as new sedimentary rocks. Since the Jurassic rocks occurred after the Triassic sediments of the Dockum Group, they could not have been reworked into the Dockum sediments as inclusions.

== Palaeoenvironment ==
The inferred palaeoclimate of the Dockum Group would have been subtropical and governed by a distinct dry/wet season pattern, with the latter marked by monsoonal rains. The botanical evidence indicates that the area was densely forested, and the abundance of both invertebrate and vertebrate material from the site suggests that the locale was in general richly populated by a wide variety of species. Dinosaurs were still fairly rare in the Dockum group, and only some ceratosaurs and other basal forms are well documented. The principal carnivores of the locale would have been poposaurids such as Postosuchus, a species well represented in the Triassic redbeds of Texas. Other archaic archosaurs, such as rhynchosaurs and aetosaurs, were also fairly common.

=== Taphonomy ===
Both the holotype and paratype were recovered from disparate locations, both disarticulated and unassociated. Consequently, spatial relationships are impossible to determine. No record of the original orientation of the material even as recovered, exists. Further material assigned to the taxon has been recovered in isolation with no apparent spatial relationships to each other, and their referral to Protoavis is difficult to support.

Not only were the remains recovered disarticulated and unassociated, there are morphometric differences in the various components of the holotype and paratype. For instance, the scapulae and coracoids are heavily reduced, to the point that association with the axial skeleton is extremely difficult to support. Juvenile ontogeny cannot be invoked credibly to explain this discrepancy. Furthermore, the degree of morphometric variation in the holotype and paratype seems incongruent with the component material representing a conspecific assemblage of bones.

The fossils themselves display significant postmortem damage, and are in some cases so badly crushed and distorted at the hand of geological processes, that accurate interpretation thereof is impossible.

In his definitive analysis of the material, The Rise of Birds (1997), Chatterjee failed to illustrate the Protoavis fossils via pictures or sketches of the fossils proper, and instead offered artistic reconstructions. For this, Chatterjee has been criticized.

== See also ==
- Proavis
- Origin of birds
- Origin of avian flight
- Feathered dinosaurs
- Temporal paradox (paleontology)
