= Cooper Canyon Formation =

Geological formation in Texas, US

- Stratigraphic range: Upper Triassic, Norian
- Type: Geological formation
- Unit of: Dockum Group
- Overlies: Camp Springs Formation, possibly Colorado City Formation

Location
- Coordinates: 33.127°N 101.366°W
- Region: Texas
- Country: United States
- Cooper Canyon Formation (the United States) Cooper Canyon Formation (Texas)

The Cooper Canyon Formation is a geological formation of Norian age in Texas. It is one of several formations encompassed by the Dockum Group.

The type area of the formation is situated in Garza County, Texas, southeast of Lubbock. The Cooper Canyon Formation consist of reddish siltstone and mudstone with lenses of sandstone and conglomerate. Thickness of the formation in the type area is 161.5 meters. It increases to the south, and in some places exceeds 200 m. The formation contains diverse fossils, including vertebrate remains.

== Regional equivalents ==
The Bull Canyon Formation in eastern New Mexico is equivalent to the upper part of the Cooper Canyon Formation. Some researchers argue that the latter name should be abandoned. The middle and lower parts of the Cooper Canyon are correlated to the Trujillo and Tecovas formations (respectively) further north in the Texas Panhandle. The lowermost part of the Cooper Canyon Formation may also be correlated to the Colorado City Formation further south at Otis Chalk (Howard County).

== Vertebrate fauna ==
Color key: Taxon / Reclassified taxon / Taxon falsely reported as present / Dubious taxon or junior synonym / Ichnotaxon / Ootaxon / Morphotaxon	Notes; Uncertain or tentative taxa are in small text; ~~crossed out~~ taxa are discredited.

=== Temnospondyls ===
Temnospondyls of the Cooper Canyon Formation
Genus/Taxon	Species	Unit	Location	Material	Notes	Images
Apachesaurus	A. gregorii	Lower (upper)	Post Quarry (MOTT 3624)	Partial skull, mandible and pectoral girdle	The lowest known stratigraphic occurrence of diagnostic Apachesaurus cranial material.	
Buettnererpeton	B. bakeri	Lower (lower)	Boren Quarry (MOTT 3869)	Two skulls	A metoposaurid temnospondyl. Species was originally assigned to Anaschisma or Metoposaurus before being given its own genus in 2022.	Buettnererpeton bakeri
Rileymillerus	R. cosgriffi	Lower (upper)	Post Quarry (MOTT 3624)	Skull and jaws, vertebral intercentra	An unusual small temnospondyl, known only by one specimen.	Buettnererpeton bakeri

=== Archosaurs ===
==== Phytosaurs ====
Phytosaurs of the Cooper Canyon Formation
Genus/Taxon	Species	Unit	Location	Material	Notes	Images
Leptosuchus	L. sp.	Lower (upper)	Post Quarry (MOTT 3624)	Partial skull and mandibles	May represent a distinct species of Leptosuchus from L. crosbiensis and L. studeri.	
Machaeroprosopus	M. lottorum	Upper	Patricia Site (MOTT 3870)	Two skulls	A derived mystriosuchin phytosaur closely related to and intermediate with Redondasaurus.	
Machaeroprosopus	M. sp.	Upper	Patricia Site (MOTT 3870)	One skull	A specimen of Machaeoprosopus that appears phylogenetically distinct from M. lottorum.	
Machaeroprosopus	M. sp.	Middle	Headquarters (MOTT 3892)	Squamosal	The lowest occurrence of Machaeoprosopus in the Dockum Group, defining the base of the Revueltian teilzone in the Cooper Canyon Formation.	
"Paleorhinus"	"P." cf. sawini	Lower (lower)	Boren Quarry (MOTT 3869)	Skull	A phytosaur similar to "Paleorhinus" sawini, although potentially representing a distinct species.	
Redondasaurus?	R. gregorii?	Upper	Macy Ranch (MOTT 3927)	Skull and postcranial skeleton (specimen TTUP 9425).	Specimens currently only described in unpublished theses, initially referred to a new informal genus "Macysuchus". Referred to R. gregorii by Spielmann and Lucas (2012).	

==== Pseudosuchians ====
Indeterminate paracrocodylomorph and stagonolepidid material is known from the Boren Quarry (MOTT 3869).

Pseudosuchians of the Cooper Canyon Formation
Genus/Taxon	Species	Unit	Location	Material	Notes	Images
Calyptosuchus	C. wellesi	Lower (lower)	Boren Quarry (MOTT 3869)		A desmatosuchian aetosaur. Material from Post Quarry named as the new genus and species Scutarx deltatylus in 2016.	Poposaurus gracilis Postosuchus kirkpatricki Scutarx deltatylus Shuvosaurus inexpectatus
Crocodylomorpha indet.	Indeterminate	Lower (upper, lower)	Post Quarry (MOTT 3624); Boren Quarry (MOTT 3869)	Femora	A small crocodylomorph comparable to Hesperosuchus.	Poposaurus gracilis Postosuchus kirkpatricki Scutarx deltatylus Shuvosaurus inexpectatus
Desmatosuchus	D. smalli	Lower (upper)	Post Quarry (MOTT 3624)	Several skulls and partial skeletons, osteoderms	An armoured aetosaur with large shoulder spines. Type locality of D. smalli, species also known from the Chinle Formation. Some skeletal postcranial material may belong to Paratypothorax.	Poposaurus gracilis Postosuchus kirkpatricki Scutarx deltatylus Shuvosaurus inexpectatus
Garzapelta	G. muelleri	Middle	UU Sand Creek (MOTT 3882)	Osteoderms and some associated postcrania	Believed to be a paratypothoracin aetosaur, but with lateral osteoderms convergent with desmatosuchins.	Poposaurus gracilis Postosuchus kirkpatricki Scutarx deltatylus Shuvosaurus inexpectatus
Paratypothorax	P. sp.	Lower (upper)	Post Quarry (MOTT 3624)	Osteoderms and some associated postcrania	A paratypothoracin aetosaur. Potentially belongs to a distinct species from P. andressorum, as for other North American Paratypothorax.	Poposaurus gracilis Postosuchus kirkpatricki Scutarx deltatylus Shuvosaurus inexpectatus
Pattisaura	P. gracilis	Middle (upper)	Headquarters South (MOTT 3898)	An articulated skull and postcranial skeleton	An early crocodylomorph.	Poposaurus gracilis Postosuchus kirkpatricki Scutarx deltatylus Shuvosaurus inexpectatus
Poposaurus	P. gracilis	Lower (lower)	Boren Quarry (MOTT 3869)	Femur, cervical vertebra	A bipedal predatory paracrocodylomorph.	Poposaurus gracilis Postosuchus kirkpatricki Scutarx deltatylus Shuvosaurus inexpectatus
Postosuchus	P. kirkpatricki	Upper?; Lower (upper)	Patricia Site (MOTT 3870)?; Post Quarry (MOTT 3624)	Two skeletons and isolated remains	A large predatory rauisuchid, type specimen from the Post Quarry. Most rauisuchid material from elsewhere in the southwestern US has also been assigned to Postosuchus kirkpatricki but it is unclear how much of it definitively belongs to Postosuchus. A fifth metatarsal from the Boren Quarry (MOTT 3869) may belong to Postosuchus.	Poposaurus gracilis Postosuchus kirkpatricki Scutarx deltatylus Shuvosaurus inexpectatus
Scutarx	S. deltatylus	Middle; Lower (upper)	Headquarters NW (MOTT 3899); Post Quarry (MOTT 3624)	Osteoderms	A desmatosuchine aetosaur based on material formerly assigned to Calyptosuchus wellesi. Known more abundantly in the Chinle Formation.	Poposaurus gracilis Postosuchus kirkpatricki Scutarx deltatylus Shuvosaurus inexpectatus
Shuvosaurus	S. inexpectatus	Upper?; Lower (upper, lower)	Patricia Site (MOTT 3870)?; Post Quarry (MOTT 3624); Boren Quarry (MOTT 3869)	Skulls and skeleton	Originally named as an ornithomimid dinosaur based on its skull, later recognised to be synonymous with poposauroid postcrania named "Chatterjeea elegans". Type specimen is from the Post Quarry, Shuvosaurus has also reported from the Chinle Formation.	Poposaurus gracilis Postosuchus kirkpatricki Scutarx deltatylus Shuvosaurus inexpectatus
Cf. Stagonolepis?	S.? sp.	Lower (lower)	Boren Quarry (MOTT 3869)	Lateral and caudal paramedian osteoderm	Aetosaur osteoderms compared favourably to Stagonolepis (including Calyptosuchus at the time).	Poposaurus gracilis Postosuchus kirkpatricki Scutarx deltatylus Shuvosaurus inexpectatus
Typothorax	T. coccinarum	Upper; Lower (upper)	Patricia Site (MOTT 3870); Post Quarry (MOTT 3624)	Partial skeleton, braincase, and osteoderms	A typothoracine aetosaur. Also commonly found in the Chinle Formation of Arizona and the Bull Canyon Formation of New Mexico.	Poposaurus gracilis Postosuchus kirkpatricki Scutarx deltatylus Shuvosaurus inexpectatus

==== Ornithodirans ====
Numerous bones from ornithodirans have been discovered throughout the Cooper Canyon Formation but cannot be assigned to specific genera or clades. However, they are at least variably identifiable as lagerpetids, dinosauromorphs, dinosaurs, saurischians and theropods.

Ornithodirans of the Cooper Canyon Formation
Genus/Taxon	Species	Unit	Location	Material	Notes	Images
~~Coelophysis~~	~~C. bauri~~	Lower (upper)	Post Quarry (MOTT 3624)		Material since referred to indeterminate herrerasaurids and neotheropods.	
Dinosauriformes indet.	Indeterminate	Lower (lower)	Boren Quarry (MOTT 3869)	Two left fibulae	The fibulae are most similar to those of Marasuchus, but notably are three times as long.	
Dromomeron	D. gregorii	Lower (upper, lower)	Post Quarry (MOTT 3624); Boren Quarry (MOTT 3869)	Four left femora	Lagerpetid pterosauromorphs.	
Dromomeron	D. romeri	Middle (upper)	Headquarters South (MOTT 3898)	Proximal right tibia	Lagerpetid pterosauromorphs.	
Herrerasauridae indet.	Indeterminate	Lower (upper)	Post Quarry (MOTT 3624)	Partial hip	Previously referred to Coelophysis bauri by Lehman and Chatterjee (2005).	
Neotheropoda indet.	Indeterminate	Lower (upper)	Post Quarry (MOTT 3624)	Ilium and tibia	Previously referred to Coelophysis bauri by Lehman and Chatterjee (2005).	
Soumyasaurus	S. aenigmaticus	Lower (upper)	Post Quarry (MOTT 3624)	Left dentary	A very small silesaurid dinosauriform, type specimen.	
Technosaurus	T. smalli	Lower (upper)	Post Quarry (MOTT 3624)	Premaxilla and dentary	A silesaurid dinosauriform, type and only specimen.	

=== Archosauromorphs ===
Fragmentary fossils are identifiable as archosauromorphs, namely members of the Allokotosauria+Prolacerta+Archosauriformes clade.

Non-crurotarsan archosauromorphs of the Cooper Canyon Formation
Genus/Taxon	Species	Unit	Location	Material	Notes	Images
cf. Doswellia	cf. D. sp.	Lower (lower)	Boren Quarry (MOTT 3869)	Fragmentary osteoderm	An unusual armoured archosauriform.	Trilophosaurus buettneri Vancleavea campi
?Malerisaurus	?M. langstoni	Middle; Lower (upper, lower)	Headquarters North (MOTT 3900); Post Quarry (MOTT 3624); Boren Quarry (MOTT 3869)	Dentaries, cervical vertebrae, femur, humerus.	A Malerisaurus-like taxon, a small carnivorous azendohsaurid allokotosaur. Three dentaries from the Boren Quarry were misinterpreted as the oldest saurischian dinosaurs in North America, but show affinity to malerisaurines.	Trilophosaurus buettneri Vancleavea campi
Tanystropheidae indet.	Indeterminate	Lower (middle, lower)	Kirkpatrick Quarry (MOTT 3628); Boren Quarry (MOTT 3869)	Two femora	Small tanystropheids comparable to Tanytrachelos and Langobardisaurus.	Trilophosaurus buettneri Vancleavea campi
Trilophosaurus	T. buettneri	Lower (lower)	Boren Quarry (MOTT 3869)	Teeth	Herbivorous trilophosaurid allokotosaurs. Of the three species represented in the Boren Quarry, T. dornorum and T. jacobsi are the more common, with T. buettneri represented by only two specimens. T. jacobsi is also common at the Kahle Quarry (NMMNH L-3775) should it belong to the middle Cooper Canyon Formation.	Trilophosaurus buettneri Vancleavea campi
Trilophosaurus	T. dornorum	Lower (upper, lower)	Post Quarry (MOTT 3624); Lott Hill (MOTT 3878); Boren Quarry (MOTT 3869)	Teeth, jaw elements	Herbivorous trilophosaurid allokotosaurs. Of the three species represented in the Boren Quarry, T. dornorum and T. jacobsi are the more common, with T. buettneri represented by only two specimens. T. jacobsi is also common at the Kahle Quarry (NMMNH L-3775) should it belong to the middle Cooper Canyon Formation.	Trilophosaurus buettneri Vancleavea campi
Trilophosaurus	T. jacobsi	Lower (lower)	Boren Quarry (MOTT 3869)	Teeth	Herbivorous trilophosaurid allokotosaurs. Of the three species represented in the Boren Quarry, T. dornorum and T. jacobsi are the more common, with T. buettneri represented by only two specimens. T. jacobsi is also common at the Kahle Quarry (NMMNH L-3775) should it belong to the middle Cooper Canyon Formation.	Trilophosaurus buettneri Vancleavea campi
Vancleavea	V. campi	Lower (upper, lower)	Post Quarry (MOTT 3624); Boren Quarry (MOTT 3869)	Postcervical vertebrae, osteoderms (MOTT 3624)	An unusual armoured semi-aquatic archosauriform. Additional limb bones from the Post and Kirkpatrick quarries may belong to Vancleavea or a related taxon.	Trilophosaurus buettneri Vancleavea campi

=== Other amniotes ===
Numerous fragmentary limb bones of various reptiles have been collected that cannot be reliably diagnosed to specific clades, though some show similarities to drepanosauromorphs. Indeterminate procolophonid material is known from the Boren Quarry (MOTT 3869).

Miscellaneous amniotes of the Cooper Canyon Formation
Genus/Taxon	Species	Unit	Location	Material	Notes	Image
Argodicynodon	A. boreni	Lower (lower)	Boren Quarry (MOTT 3869)	Skull, mandibles, and postcrania	A placeriine dicynodont, related to the later Placerias.	
Cf. Clevosaurus	Cf. C. sp.	Lower (upper)	Post Quarry (MOTT 3624)	Premaxilla	A sphenodontian lepidosauromorph, very similar to Clevosaurus.	
Dicynodontia indet.	Indeterminate	Lower (middle)	MOTT 3610; McCarty Ranch (MOTT 0690)	Cranial fragments, sternum.	Isolated indeterminate dicynodont material.	
Drepanosauromorpha indet.	Indeterminate	Lower (upper, lower)	Post Quarry (MOTT 3624); Boren Quarry (MOTT 3869)	Two scapulacoracoids (MOTT 3624)	An unusual, possibly arboreal diapsid reptile.	
Eucynodontia indet.	Indeterminate	Lower	Post Quarry (MOTT 3624)	Jaw bones and teeth	Probable eucynodonts with teeth lacking a cingulum and possessing a large main cusp and 2–3 smaller posterior cusps.	
Fabanychus	F. monos	Middle	Headquarters Site (MOTT 3898-2)	An isolated manual ungual	A drepanosauromorph also known from the Chinle Formation; similar to Ancistronychus	
Kannemeyeriiformes indet.	Indeterminate	Lower (upper)	Post Quarry (MOTT 3624); Meyer's Hill (MOTT 3881)	A humerus (MOTT 3881) and a femur (MOTT 3624).	Isolated indeterminate kannemeyeriiforms, potentially distinct from Argodicynodon.	
Libognathus	L. sheddi	Upper; Middle	Simpson Ranch (MOTT 3874); UU Sand Creek (MOTT 3882)	Skull and dentaries	A procolophonid parareptile, one of the only known from Late Triassic North America.	
~~Pachygenelus~~	~~P. milleri~~	Lower (upper)	Post Quarry (MOTT 3624)	Dentary with teeth	Named as a new species of Pachygenelus by Chatterjee (1983), assignment to this genus is doubtful. Material now provisionally regarded as eucynodont.	
Protoavis	P. texensis	Lower (upper, middle)	Post Quarry (MOTT 3624); Kirkpatrick Quarry (MOTT 3628)	At least two partial skeletons	A problematic taxon purported to be an early avialan, may be a chimaera of different fossils.	
Sphenodontia indet.	Indeterminate	Lower (upper, lower)	Post Quarry (MOTT 3624); Boren Quarry (MOTT 3869)	Pterygoid and mandible	Sphenodont lepidosauromorphs.	

== See also ==
- List of dinosaur-bearing rock formations

== Links ==
- Bull Canyon Formation of Chinle Group by USGS
