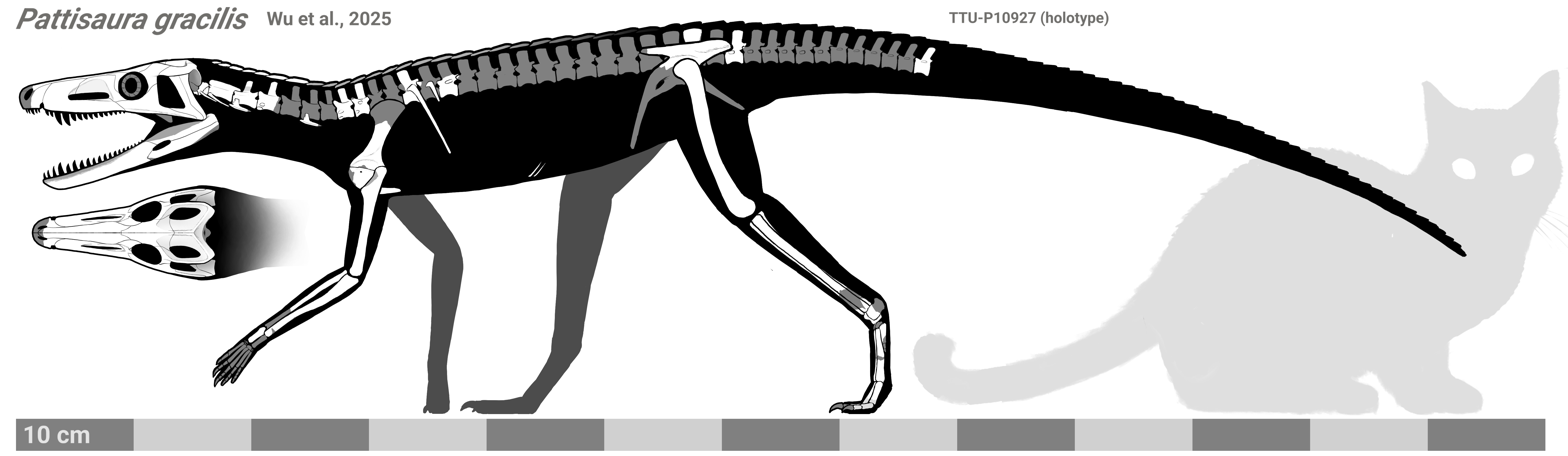
- Reconstructed skeleton (house cat for size reference)

Scientific classification
- Kingdom: Animalia
- Phylum: Chordata
- Class: Reptilia
- Clade: Pseudosuchia
- Clade: Crocodylomorpha
- Genus: †Pattisaura; Wu et al., 2025
- Species: †P. gracilis

Binomial name
- †Pattisaura gracilis Wu et al., 2025

= Pattisaura =

Pattisaura Temporal range: Late Triassic, Norian

Genus of extinct crocodylomorph

Pattisaura is an extinct genus of early crocodylomorph from the Late Triassic (Norian age) Cooper Canyon Formation of Texas, United States. The genus contains a single species, Pattisaura gracilis, known from a partial skeleton including the skull.

== Discovery and naming ==
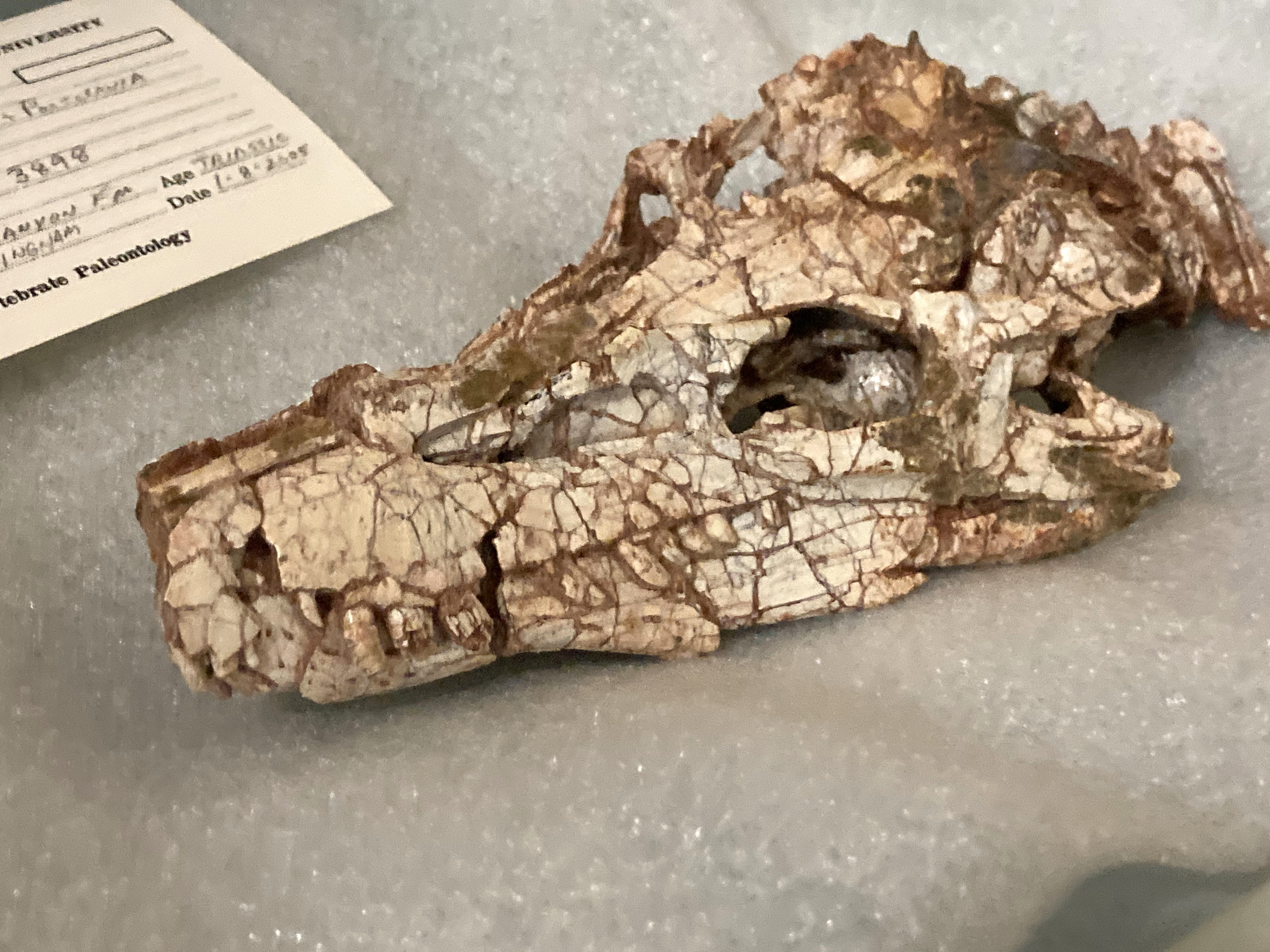
Holotype skull in the TTU museum collections

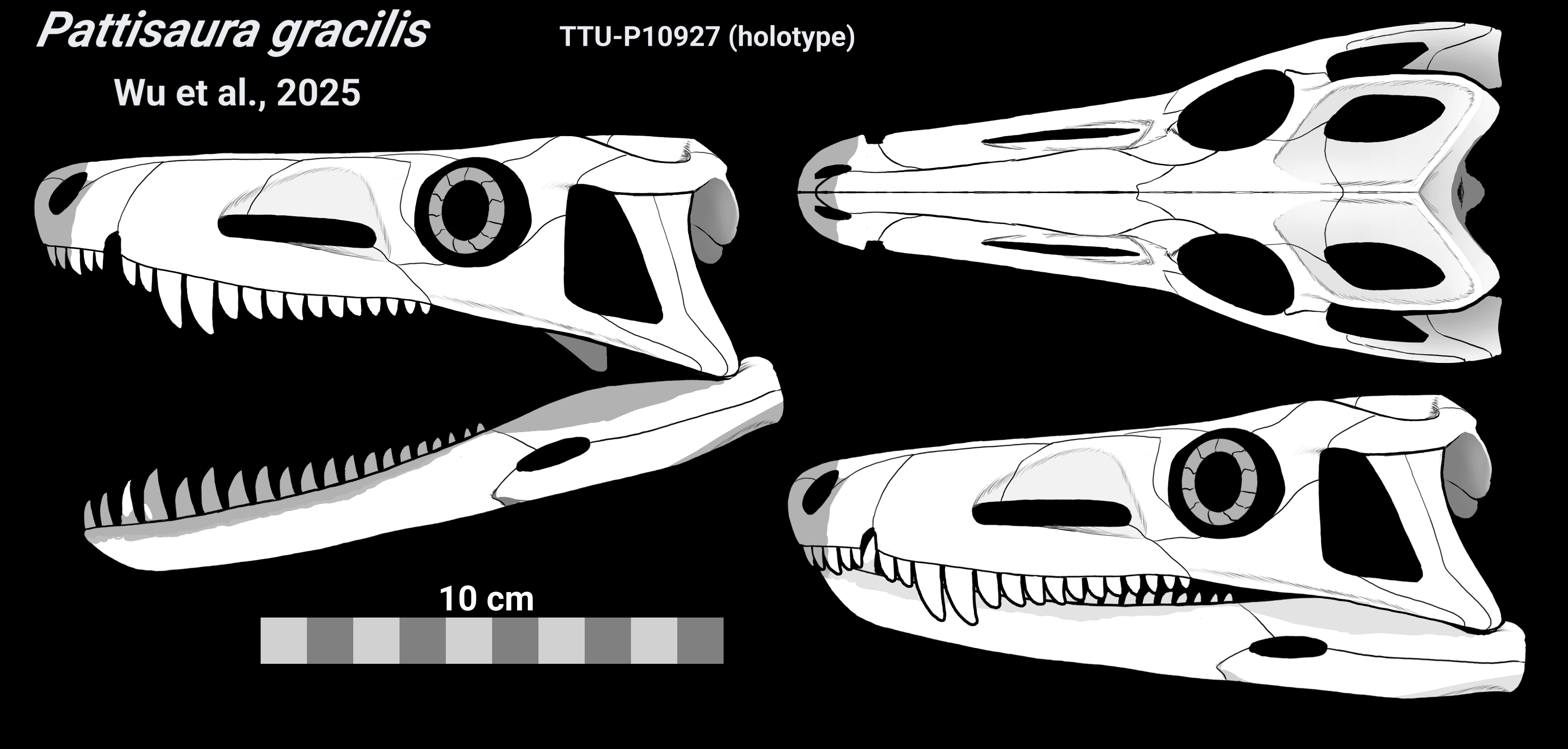
Reconstructed skull

The Pattisaura gracilis holotype specimen, TTU-P10927, was discovered in outcrops of the Cooper Canyon Formation ('Headquarters site', Dockum Group) in Garza County of Texas, United States. The specimen consists of the cranium articulated with the mandible and the first four cervical vertebrae. The associated postcranial bones are fragmented and incomplete, preserved in the same block as the skull. These include four presacral, two sacral, and two caudal vertebrae, the right scapula and coracoid and parts of both forelimbs (humeri, ulnae, and radii), the left ilium and parts of both hindlimbs (femora, tibiae, left fibula, right astragalus, some bones of both feet), and several dorsal osteoderms and ribs.

In 2025, Wu et al. described Pattisaura gracilis as a new genus and species of early crocodylomorph based on these fossil remains. The generic name, Pattisaura, honors Patricia Kirkpatrick and her family, on whose ranch the holotype and many other vertebrate fossils have been collected by Texas Tech University. This is combined with saura, the feminine declension of the Greek sauros, meaning 'lizard' or 'reptile'. The specific name, gracilis, refers to the slender morphology of the hindlimbs.

== Classification ==
To test the affinities and relationships of Pattisaura, Wu et al. (2025) included it in an updated version of the phylogenetic matrix associated with Ruebenstahl et al. (2022). They recovered it as a basal crocodylomorph in a sister taxon relationship with Redondavenator. The researchers noted that these two genera are the geographically closest non-crocodyliform crocodylomorphs in North America, although Redondavenator is from the slightly younger Redonda Formation of New Mexico. Their analysis supported this relationship based on a single synapomorphy, an enlarged fourth or fifth maxillary alveolus (tooth socket in the upper jaw). As such, this relationship is weakly-supported, but may still indicate close affinities between the two. These results are displayed in the cladogram below:

- Crocodylomorpha
  - †Trialestes
  - - †Phyllodontosuchus
    - - †Litargosuchus
      - †Terrestrisuchus
    - - †Saltoposuchus
      - - - †Pattisaura
          - †Redondavenator
        - - †Dromicosuchus
          - - - †Pseudhesperosuchus
              - †Hesperosuchus spp.
            - - †Kayentasuchus
              - - †Sphenosuchus
                - - †Dibothrosuchus
                  - Solidocrania
                    ⊞
                    - †Hallopus
                    - - †Junggarsuchus
                      - - †Macelognathus
                        - - †Almadasuchus
                          - Crocodyliformes
                            - †Protosuchia
                            - Mesoeucrocodylia
                    ⊟
