= Colorado City Formation =

Geologic formation in Texas, United States

- Stratigraphic range: Late Triassic
- Type: Formation
- Unit of: Dockum Group
- Underlies: possibly Cooper Canyon Formation
- Overlies: Camp Springs Formation

Lithology
- Primary: siltstone, sandstone

Location
- Region: Texas
- Country: United States

The Colorado City Formation is a Late Triassic geologic formation in the Dockum Group of Texas, United States. It has previously been known as the Iatan Member, Colorado City Member or 'Pre-Tecovas Horizon' (as it is assumed to be older than the Tecovas Formation).

The Colorado City Formation is mostly restricted to Howard and Borden counties. The formation hosts the Otis Chalk fossil sites, named after a ghost town in Howard County. Despite their importance, the Otis Chalk localities have been difficult to resolve in the stratigraphy of Triassic Texas. They occupy a narrow band of sediments between the slightly older Camp Springs Formation and much younger Cretaceous deposits.

The first major excavations near Otis Chalk were led by UMMP paleontologists starting in 1927. Several new phytosaur species were discovered during these digs. University of Oklahoma paleontologists followed with their own expedition in 1931. The vast majority of fossils collected from the formation were recovered during a 1939–1941 state-sponsored Works Progress Administration paleontological survey. Several sites southeast of Big Spring were particularly productive. Fossils collected by these efforts were stored at the newly opened Texas Memorial Museum in Austin. Since the 1940s, collection from the Otis Chalk area has been more limited. One notable find is a pond deposit, the Schaeffer Fish Quarry, discovered in 1967 by AMNH paleontologist Bobb Schaeffer.

== Biochronological significance ==
The Otis Chalk localities that are situated in the Colorado City Formation form the basis of the Otischalkian Land Vertebrate Faunachron (LVF), which is defined by the first appearance of Parasuchus.

== Paleobiota ==
Color key: Taxon / Reclassified taxon / Taxon falsely reported as present / Dubious taxon or junior synonym / Ichnotaxon / Ootaxon / Morphotaxon	Notes; Uncertain or tentative taxa are in small text; ~~crossed out~~ taxa are discredited.

=== Reptiles ===
==== Archosaurs ====
Other archosaur fossils include remains of an unnamed silesaurid and a partial femur of a theropod or herrerasaurian dinosaur referable to the Chindesaurus + Tawa clade.

Archosaurs of the Colorado City Formation
Genus / Taxon	Species	Material	Location	Notes	Images
"Chatterjeea"	C. elegans	Vertebrae, hip bones, and femora	Quarry 3 (TMM 31100)	Postcranial bones of an unusual bipedal archosaur related to poposaurids. Later determined to be synonymous with Shuvosaurus, a shuvosaurid poposauroid initially misidentified as a theropod dinosaur.	
Coahomasuchus	C. kahleorum	Two skeletons, one of which is nearly complete while the other shows adaptations for a carnivorous diet.	NMMNH locality 3357; Quarry 3 (TMM 31100)?	An aetosaurine aetosaur	
Crocodylomorpha	indet.	Isolated ilium	Quarry 3 (TMM 31100)	An unnamed basal crocodylomorph, one of the oldest from North America.	
Desmatosuchus?	D. spurensis?	Osteoderms (scutes) and vertebrae	"near Otis Chalk"; Borden County Site 1 (TMM 31213)	Most Otis Chalk desmatosuchin aetosaur fossils have been referred to Longosuchus or Lucasuchus, but a few have been referred to Desmatosuchus (Episcoposaurus) haplocerus. The modern valid combination for this species is Desmatosuchus spurensis.	
Dromomeron	D. gregorii	Hindlimb bones (femora and tibiae)	Quarry 3 (TMM 31100)	A lagerpetid avemetatarsalian	
Lepidus	L. praecisio	Partial hindlimb (tibia, fibula, astragalus)	near "site 7" (TMM 41936)	A possible coelophysid theropod, potentially the oldest dinosaur from North America.	
Longosuchus	L. meadei	Skulls, osteoderms, vertebrae, other postcrania	Site 3 (TMM 31098); Quarry 3 (TMM 31100); Quarry 3A (TMM 31185); Borden County Site 1 (TMM 31213)	A common desmatosuchin aetosaur previously considered a species of Typothorax.	
Lucasuchus	L. hunti	Osteoderms and other referred fossils (including a possible skull)	Quarry 3 (TMM 31100); Quarry 3A (TMM 31185)	A desmatosuchin aetosaur similar to Longosuchus but most likely a distinct valid taxon.	
Poposaurus	P. gracilis	Hip and ankle bones	"Otis Chalk"; Site 3 (TMM 31098); Quarry 3 (TMM 31100)	A poposaurid poposauroid	
Poposaurus	P. langstoni	Hip bones and vertebrae	Site/Quarry 1 (TMM 31025); Quarry 3 (TMM 31100)	A poposaurid poposauroid previously given its own genus, Lythrosuchus	
Postosuchus	P. kirkpatricki	Vertebrae and hindlimb bones	Quarry 3 (TMM 31100); Borden County Site 1 (TMM 31213)	A rausuchid loricatan	

==== Phytosaurs ====
Phytosaurs of the Colorado City Formation
Genus / Taxon	Species	Material	Location	Notes	Images
Angistorhinus	A. alticephalus	Partial skeleton with skull	Roy Lamb Ranch	Probable junior synonym of A. grandis.	
Angistorhinus	A. grandis	Several complete skulls and associated cranial and postcranial fragments	Site 3 (TMM 31098); Quarry 3 (TMM 31100); TMM 42060; "locality 9"	A common mystriosuchine phytosaur. Some sources refer all Otis Chalk Angistorhinus material to "Angistorhinus megalodon", while most other sources support affinities with the type species Angistorhinus grandis from Wyoming.	
Brachysuchus	B. megalodon	Two nearly complete skulls and postcranial fragments	"near Otis Chalk"	A mystriosuchine phytosaur closely related to Angistorhinus, and sometimes regarded as a species within that genus.	
Paleorhinus	"P." sawini	A skull	Borden County Site 1 (TMM 31213)	A basal (non-mystriosuchine) phytosaur from Borden County. Probably does not form a clade with other species referred to Paleorhinus or Parasuchus.	
Paleorhinus	P. bransoni	Several skulls	Site/Quarry 1 (TMM 31025); Quarry 3 (TMM 31100); Quarry 3A (TMM 31185)	A common basal (non-mystriosuchine) phytosaur, sometimes considered a species of Parasuchus.	

==== Other reptiles ====
Other reptiles of the Colorado City Formation
Genus	Species	Material	Location	Notes	Images
Ankylosuchus	A. chinlegroupensis	Partial skeleton with cranial and pelvic fragments, osteoderms, vertebrae, and an indeterminate limb bone	NMMNH locality 3101	A doswelliid archosauriform.	
Doswellia	D. kaltenbachi	Vertebrae and osteoderms	Site/Quarry 1 (TMM 31025); Site 3 (TMM 31098)	A doswelliid archosauriform.	
Malerisaurus	M. langstoni	Disarticulated skeleton	Quarry 2 (TMM 31099)	A carnivorous azendohsaurid allokotosaurian in the subfamily Malerisaurinae. Regarded as a chimera by Spielmann et al. (2006), but treated as valid by other sources. Numerous disarticulated Malerisaurus-like fossils are also known from Quarry 1 (TMM 31025).	
Otischalkia	O. elderae	Humeri, femora	Site/Quarry 1 (TMM 31025); Quarry 3A (TMM 31185)	A dubious putative rhynchosaur, likely synonymous with Malerisaurus langstoni. Supposed premaxilla fossils have been reinterpreted as metoposaurid cleithra. Femora and humeri previously referred to this species likely belong to Trilophosaurus or Malerisaurus instead.	
Protecovasaurus	P. lucasi	Teeth	Quarry 1 (NMMNH 860)	A reptile of uncertain affinities known from serrated teeth similar to ornithischian dinosaurs.	
Trilophosaurus	T. buettneri	Numerous skulls, braincases, and postcranial material	Site/Quarry 1 (TMM 31025); Quarry 2 (TMM 31099); Quarry 3 (TMM 31100); Quarry 3A (TMM 31185); Borden County Site 1 (TMM 31213)	A common trilophosaurid allokotosaurian.	
Triopticus	T. primus	Partial skull	Quarry 3 (TMM 31100)	A protopyknosian archosauriform with a reinforced skull similar to pachycephalosaurid dinosaurs.	

=== Amphibians ===
Amphibians of the Colorado City Formation
Genus	Species	Material	Location	Notes	Images
Anaschisma	A. browni	Numerous skulls, interclavicles, clavicles, vertebrae, and other postcranial bones	Site/Quarry 1 (TMM 31025); Site 3 (TMM 31098); Quarry 2 (TMM 31099); Quarry 3 (TMM 31100); Quarry 3A (TMM 31185); Borden County Site 3 (TMM 41921)	A common metoposaurid temnospondyl, previously named under the genus Koskinonodon or Buettneria	
Latiscopus	L. disjunctus	A skull	Site/Quarry 1 (TMM 31025)	A latiscopid temnospondyl	

=== Fish ===
Fish fossils from Quarry 1 (NMMNH 860 / TMM 31025) include lungfish teeth (Arganodus?), coelacanth scales, "palaeoniscid" scales (aff. Turseodus), and hybodont shark teeth and spines (Lissodus? or Lonchidion?).

Fish of the Colorado City Formation
Genus / Taxon	Species	Material	Location	Notes	Images
Cionichthys	C. greeni	Articulated skulls and postcrania	Schaeffer Fish Quarry	A redfieldiiform actinopterygian (ray-finned fish)	
Lasalichthys	L. hillsi	Skull, scale, and postcranial fragments	Schaeffer Fish Quarry	A redfieldiiform actinopterygian	
Lasalichthys	L. otischalkensis	Numerous articulated skulls and postcrania	Schaeffer Fish Quarry	A redfieldiiform actinopterygian. Some specimens were previously referred to Lasalichthys (= Synorichthys) stewarti.	

== See also ==
- List of fossiliferous stratigraphic units in Texas
- Paleontology in Texas
