= Armijo Peak =

Landform in Torrance County, New Mexico

- Location within New Mexico Location within the United States

Highest point
- Elevation: 5,866 ft (1,788 m)
- Coordinates: 34°50′25″N 105°18′57″W

Geography
- Location: Torrance County, New Mexico, United States
- Topo map: USGS Pinavete Canyon

Geology
- Rock age: Late Triassic (237 to 201 Mya)
- Rock type: Santa Rosa Sandstone

Armijo Peak is located 1 mile (1.6 km) north east of Derramadero in Torrance County, New Mexico. Armijo Peak rises from the north bank of the Pintada Arroyo.
