= Bull Canyon Formation =

Geological formation in New Mexico and Texas, US

- Stratigraphic range: Upper Triassic, late Norian (215-210 Ma)
- Type: Geological formation
- Unit of: Dockum Group
- Underlies: Redonda Formation
- Overlies: Trujillo Formation
- Thickness: 110 metres (360 ft)

Lithology
- Primary: mudstone
- Other: sandstone, siltstone, conglomerate

Location
- Region: New Mexico, Texas
- Country: United States

Type section
- Named for: Bull Canyon (Guadalupe County, New Mexico)
- Named by: Lucas & Hunt, 1989

The Bull Canyon Formation is a geological formation of Late Triassic (Norian) age in eastern New Mexico and the Texas Panhandle. It is one of several formations encompassed by the Dockum Group, overlying the Trujillo Formation and underlying the Redonda Formation.

The Bull Canyon Formation preserves reptile fossils of the Revueltian "faunachron" (215 to 210 million years ago). It is equivalent to the upper part of the Cooper Canyon Formation, which crops out further south in west-central Texas. It could be regarded as the upper member (Bull Canyon Member) of the Cooper Canyon Formation.

== History and geology ==
Triassic rocks in the Tucumcari Basin of east-central New Mexico have been prospected for fossils since the 1890s. The bulk of early fossil collecting in the formation was done by University of Michigan paleontologist E.C. Case (starting in the 1910s) and Yale paleontologist Joseph T. Gregory (starting in the 1940s). For much of the 20th century, all Late Triassic strata in New Mexico was assumed to belong to the Chinle Formation. Kelley (1972) informally labelled a unit of fine-grained sediments in the upper part of the Triassic strata as the "upper shale member" of the Chinle Formation.

Lucas & Hunt (1989) introduced the name "Bull Canyon Formation" for these exposures, referring to an area of badlands near Luciano Mesa in eastern Guadalupe County, New Mexico. At the Bull Canyon badlands (the type locality), the formation preserves 95 metres (312 ft) of sediment, about 80% of which is dark reddish mudstone. Yellowish-grey or greyish-red fine quartzarenite sandstone makes up about 16% of the layers, with rare siltstone and siltstone-pebble conglomerate. Of special note is a thick brownish litharenite sandstone bed, the Saladito Point Bed, which is comparable to some sandstone beds in Petrified Forest National Park, Arizona. The Bull Canyon Formation reaches a maximum thickness of 110 metres (360 ft) in eastern New Mexico. It lies above the Trujillo Formation, which has a much greater proportion of sandstone beds. In New Mexico, the Bull Canyon Formation is overlain by a similar but generally finer-grained geological unit, the Redonda Formation.

=== Relationship to the Cooper Canyon Formation ===
For much of the 1990s and 2000s, the Bull Canyon Formation was conflated with another geological unit in the Dockum Group: the Cooper Canyon Formation. The Cooper Canyon Formation, which is most well-exposed in Garza County, Texas, was initially named as the "Cooper Member" by Chatterjee (1986), before being raised to formation status by Lehman et al. (1992). Both formations are thick geological units with a large proportion of reddish mudstone. Lehman et al. (1992) and Lehman (1994) argued that the Bull Canyon Formation should be synonymized with the Cooper Canyon Formation. These authors suggested that the Boren Ranch Sandstone, which underlies the Cooper Canyon Formation in Garza County, is equivalent to the sandstone-rich Trujillo Formation in New Mexico and the Texas Panhandle. If this is the case, then the "Cooper Member" (and consequently Cooper Canyon Formation) would take priority as the first formal name applied to the mudstone-rich strata above the Trujillo Formation.

Lucas and his colleagues pushed back, arguing that the "Cooper Member" was an invalid name: Chatterjee (1986)'s original stratotype was too thin to be comparable with other areas, and "Cooper" was preoccupied by Cooper Marl of South Carolina. They favored the Bull Canyon Formation as the first valid formal name for the mudstone-rich strata. Carpenter (1997) reviewed both perspectives, noting various cases of noncompliance with the North American Stratigraphic Code. Carpenter eventually sided with Lehman's perspective. Despite the disagreement between these two schools of thought, most studies agreed that the two formations, as generally perceived, were probably one-to-one equivalents.

More extensive geological mapping in Texas by Martz (2008) disagreed with the idea that the Bull Canyon and Cooper Canyon formations were exact equivalents, nullifying the debate over priority. Martz notes that the sandstone beds of the Trujillo Formation are not equivalent to the Boren Ranch Sandstone, but rather to the middle part of the Cooper Canyon Formation. This would indicate that the lower-middle part of the Cooper Canyon Formation is older than the Bull Canyon Formation, and that only the upper Cooper Canyon Formation is equivalent. Martz (2026) demoted the Bull Canyon Formation to member status, as the Bull Canyon Member of the Cooper Canyon Formation, overlying the Trujillo Member.

== Paleobiota ==
Color key: Taxon / Reclassified taxon / Taxon falsely reported as present / Dubious taxon or junior synonym / Ichnotaxon / Ootaxon / Morphotaxon

Notes
Uncertain or tentative taxa are in small text
~~crossed out~~ taxa are discredited.

Several microvertebrate assemblages are known from the Bull Canyon Formation. This paleobiota table only factors in fossils of the Bull Canyon Formation found in New Mexico or the Texas Panhandle (not the equivalent upper Cooper Canyon Formation further south).

=== Temnospondyls ===
Temnospondyls of the Bull Canyon Formation
Genus / Taxon	Species	Locality	Material	Notes	Images
Apachesaurus	A. gregorii	Bull Canyon, Revuelto Creek, Barranca Creek, Mesa Redonda,	Skull, intercentra, other possible fragments	A small metoposaurid which appears to be better suited for terrestrial life than other metoposaurids. Apachesaurus may simply represent juveniles of larger metoposaurids native to the American Southwest.	
Metoposauridae indet.			Skull fragments	Large metoposaurid fragments of uncertain affinities, most common in conglomerates in the lower part of the formation. Possibly reworked from older strata.	

=== Synapsids ===
Synapsids of the Bull Canyon Formation
Genus / Taxon	Species	Locality	Material	Notes	Images
Pseudotriconodon	P. chatterjeei	Bull Canyon	Teeth	A "dromatheriid" cynodont.	

=== Reptiles ===
==== Avemetatarsalians ====
Avemetatarsalians of the Bull Canyon Formation
Genus / Taxon	Species	Locality	Material	Notes	Images
Gojirasaurus	G. quayi	Revuelto Creek	Partial skeleton	A very large "coelophysoid" theropod dinosaur. One of the largest known Triassic theropods, though its validity as a distinct species is uncertain. Some (though not all) of its fossil material may belong to Shuvosaurus, and other remains resemble Coelophysis, albeit much larger and more robust.	
Neotheropoda indet.		Bull Canyon	Partial skeleton and fibula	Specimens NMMNH P-4569 ("Comanchesaurus kuesi" or "Herrerasaurid B") and NMMNH P-4563, belonging to large early neotheropods similar to Gojirasaurus.	
Saurischia indet.		Bull Canyon, Revuelto Creek, Barranca Creek	Teeth, partial skeletons including vertebrae and hindlimb material	Various fragmentary fossils in the Bull Canyon Formation have been referred to specific saurischian dinosaur taxa (Coelophysis, Chindesaurus, herrerasaurids, "prosauropods", etc.). These referrals are very tenuous and often contradictory. Some purported Bull Canyon dinosaur fossils, such as specimen NMMNH P-17375 ("Cryptoraptor lockleyi") are difficult to distinguish from Shuvosaurus.	

==== Phytosaurs ====
Phytosaurs of the Bull Canyon Formation
Genus / Taxon	Species	Locality	Material	Notes	Images
Machaeroprosopus	M. andersoni	"near Santa Rosa" (Bull Canyon?)	At least one skull, possibly other fossils	Sometimes known as Pseudopalatus andersoni. A 2013 study established that all phytosaur species previously classified as "Pseudopalatus" should rather be called Machaeroprosopus. The holotype of M. andersoni was probably collected from the Bull Canyon Formation. A few other phytosaur fossils may also belong to the species, though detailed investigation has not been conducted. One putative specimen preserves stomach content of Vancleavea vertebrae and smaller phytosaur hip fragments.	
Machaeroprosopus	M. mccauleyi	Bull Canyon, Revuelto Creek, Barranca Creek, Cosner Ranch,	Skulls and postcrania	A brachyrostral (thick-snouted) mystriosuchin phytosaur. American phytosaurs are prone to significant taxonomic controversy, and this holds true for fossils from the Bull Canyon Formation. At various times, "Rutiodon" gregorii, "Nicrosaurus" gregorii, "Arribasuchus" buceros, Pseudopalatus andersoni and Pseudopalatus mccauleyi have all been proposed as names for the most common Bull Canyon phytosaur species, a brachyrostral form. Many phytosaur fossils from the Bull Canyon Formation are indeterminate to the genus or species level.	
Machaeroprosopus	M. pristinus	Bull Canyon	Skulls and postcrania	An uncommon dolichorostral (slender-snouted) mystriosuchin phytosaur, previously known as Pseudopalatus pristinus. One specimen preserves stomach content of "Apachesaurus" vertebrae.	

==== Other pseudosuchians ====
Pseudosuchians of the Bull Canyon Formation
Genus / Taxon	Species	Locality	Material	Notes	Images
Aetosaurus	A. arcuatus	L-501	Osteoderms	A small and rare aetosaurine aetosaur. The referral of these fossils to Aetosaurus is questionable, as they show few diagnostic features.	
"Sphenosuchidae" indet.		Barranca Creek	Partial skeleton and skull fragments	An unnamed "sphenosuchian"-grade crocodylomorph similar to Hesperosuchus. Indeterminate "sphenosuchian" fragments are common throughout the formation.	
Paratypothorax	P. sp.	Bull Canyon, Revuelto Creek, Cosner Ranch	Osteoderms	A rare paratypothoracin aetosaur.	
Postosuchus	P. kirkpatricki	Barranca Creek	Hip, vertebrae, and hindlimbs	A large rauisuchid. Indeterminate rauisuchid fossils are common throughout the formation, including teeth, vertebrae, and other postcranial fragments.	
Revueltosaurus	R. callenderi	Revuelto Creek	Teeth, partial skeleton	A small armored aetosauriform, previously misidentified as an ornithischian dinosaur based on its similar teeth.	
Rioarribasuchus	R. chamaensis	Revuelto Creek	Paramedian osteoderms and isolated spikes	A paratypothoracin aetosaur. Also known as Heliocanthus, and previously considered a species of Desmatosuchus.	
Shuvosaurus	S. inexpectatus	Bull Canyon, Revuelto Creek, Barranca Creek	Premaxilla fragment, postcrania	A common shuvosaurid poposauroid with a bipedal stance and a toothless, beaked skull. Fossils of this species are frequently confused with those of dinosaurs and Poposaurus. Many postcranial fossils were previously described as a new genus, "Chatterjeea", until it was recognized that Shuvosaurus and "Chatterjeea" were synonyms.	
Typothorax	T. coccinarum	Bull Canyon, Revuelto Creek, Barranca Creek	Complete skeletons, osteoderms	A large typothoracine aetosaur. One of the most abundant reptiles in the formation, known from multiple complete skeletons.	

==== Other reptiles ====
Other reptiles of the Bull Canyon Formation
Genus / Taxon	Species	Locality	Material	Notes	Images
Chinlechelys	C. tenertesta	Revuelto Creek	Partial skeleton	An early turtle, sometimes regarded as a species of Proganochelys.	
Lucianosaurus	L. wildi	Luciano Mesa	Teeth	Teeth of a herbivorous archosauriform of uncertain affinities, initially described as a "fabrosaurid" ornithischian.	
Otischalkia	O. elderae	Revuelto Creek	Humerus fragments	A robust archosauromorph. Initially regarded as a late-surviving rhynchosaur, but more likely an indeterminate malerisaurine azendohsaurid.	
Squamata? indet.		Revuelto Creek, Luciano Mesa	Jaw fragments	Pleurodont jaw fragments, presumably from lepidosaurs or kuehneosaurids.	
Vancleavea	V. campi		Vertebrae, osteoderms, limb material	An armored semiaquatic archosauriform. Some vertebrae are preserved as gut contents in a phytosaur skeleton.	

=== Fish ===
Scales, coprolites, and other fragmentary fish fossils are common in the Bull Canyon and Revuelto Creek areas. Most of these likely belong to actinopterygians.

Fish of the Bull Canyon Formation
Genus / Taxon	Species	Locality	Material	Notes	Images
Arganodontidae? indet.		Revuelto Creek	Skull fragments	Indeterminate lungfish similar to Arganodus.	
"Colobodontidae"? indet.		Revuelto Creek	Tooth plates	"Phyllodont" fish teeth, traditionally referred to colobodontid or perleidid perleidiforms, but more likely belonging to other unrelated fish such as coelacanths.	
Quayia	Q. zideki	Revuelto Creek	Skull material, basisphenoid fragments, scales	A coelacanth, almost as large as living Latimeria.	
Redfieldiidae indet.		Bull Canyon, Revuelto Creek	Isolated scales and scaly body fragments	A redfieldiiform.	
Reticulodus	R. synergus	Bull Canyon, Mesa Redonda	Teeth	A hybodont shark with durophagous (crushing) dentition.	
Semionotus	S. cf. S. brauni	Bull Canyon, Revuelto Creek	Scaly body fragments	A robust semionotiform.	
Tanaocrossus?	T.? kalliokoski		Skull and skeletal material, including three-dimensional fossils	A slender "palaeonisciform".	

=== Other fossils ===
The Bull Canyon Formation preserves a rather diverse fauna of freshwater mollusks. Unionid bivalves (freshwater mussels) are locally abundant, primarily Unio (U. arizonensis and at least six unnamed species) and Antediplodon (A. dockumensis and one unnamed species). A hydrobiid snail, Triasamnicola pilsbryi, is also common. Ostracods and coiled Spirorbis-like structures (probably tiny snail shells) round out the invertebrate body fossils known from the formation.

Trackways of both vertebrates and invertebrates are known to occur in the Bull Canyon Formation. Narrow Acripes tracks were probably emplaced by notostracan crustaceans (tadpole shrimp) crawling in shallow temporary pools. A vertebrate ichnotaxon, Barrancapus cresapi, was named for vertebrate footprints found near Barranca Creek.

A few plant fossils have been found in the formation, including charophyte green algae, bennettitalean leaves (Zamites powellii), large horsetail stems (Neocalamites sp.), and foliage of an enigmatic shrubby plant (Sanmiguelia sp.). Root casts and fossil wood are not uncommon, sometimes showing signs of fungus damage.

== See also ==
- List of dinosaur-bearing rock formations
