= Tecovasaurus =

Tecovasaurus Temporal range: Norian, 221.5–212 Ma

Scientific classification
- Kingdom: Animalia
- Phylum: Chordata
- Clade: Reptiliomorpha
- Clade: Amniota
- Genus: †Tecovasaurus; Hunt & Lucas, 1994

Type species
- †Tecovasaurus murryi Hunt & Lucas, 1994

Extinct genus of reptiles

Tecovasaurus (te-KOH-va-SAWR-us) is an extinct Late Triassic amniote genus of unknown affinities, known only from teeth. It was initially described as a basal ornithischian dinosaur, subsequently reclassified as a member of the clade Archosauriformes of uncertain phylogenetic placement (Irmis et al. (2007), and later, taking into account the similarity of its teeth to the teeth of traversodontid cynodonts such as Dadadon (shared presence of teeth with sub-triangular crowns, enlarged denticles, and thecodont tooth implantation), as an amniote of uncertain affinities (Kammerer et al., 2012; though "based on dissimilarities in gross morphology and geographic separation" the authors considered it more likely that the taxon is indeed an archosauriform rather than a traversodontid). It is named after the Tecovas Formation, in Texas and Arizona, which yielded the holotype remains.
