= Garita Creek Formation =

Geologic formation in New Mexico, USA

- Stratigraphic range: Carnian
- Type: Formation
- Unit of: Chinle Group
- Underlies: Trujillo Formation
- Overlies: Santa Rosa Formation
- Thickness: 122–152 meters (400–499 ft)

Lithology
- Primary: Shale

Location
- Coordinates: 35.2998°N 104.4198°W
- Region: New Mexico
- Country: United States

Type section
- Named for: Garita Creek
- Named by: Lucas and Hunt
- Year defined: 1989
- Garita Creek Formation (the United States) Garita Creek Formation (New Mexico)

The Garita Creek Formation is a geologic formation in New Mexico that contains vertebrate fossils characteristic of the Carnian Age of the late Triassic .

The formation may be synonymous with the Tecovas Formation in Texas.

== Description ==
The formation consists mostly of gray red to red or mottled gray green mudstone containing limestone nodules. About 25% of the formation is massive fine-grained laminar gray red sandstone. It rests conformably on the Santa Rosa Formation, and is overlain disconformably by the Trujillo Formation. The total thickness of the formation is 122–152 meters (400–499 ft). It is exposed throughout the drainage of the Conchas River and its tributaries west to the Sangre de Cristo Mountains.

== Fossils ==
The formation contains vertebrate fossils of Desmatosuchus, Typothorax, Paratypothorax, Postosuchus, rauisuchians, metoposaurids, Ceratodus, and indeterminate phytosaurs. Drepanosaurids, including Unguinychus and at least one other unnamed species, have been described from the formation's Homestead Site.

== History of investigation ==
The formation was first named by Lucas and Hunt in 1989 for beds formerly assigned to the informal lower shale member of the Chinle Formation in the Tucumcari Basin. The formation definition has been criticized as a junior synonym for the Tecovas Formation across the border in Texas.

== See also ==
- List of dinosaur-bearing rock formations
  - List of stratigraphic units with indeterminate dinosaur fossils
