= Vinita Formation =

Vinita Formation may refer to:

- Vinita Formation, a Late Triassic Carnian geological formation in Virginia, part of the Newark Supergroup
- Viñita Formation, a Late Cretaceous geological formation in Chile
