= Perovka =

Perovka Перовка
- Selo
- Location within Voronezh Oblast Location within Russia
- Coordinates: 51°53′N 39°59′E
- Country: Russia
- Region: Voronezh Oblast
- District: Verkhnekhavsky District
- Time zone: UTC+3:00

Perovka (Russian: Перовка) is a rural locality (a selo) in Semyonovskoye Rural Settlement, Verkhnekhavsky District, Voronezh Oblast, Russia. The population was 123 as of 2010. There are 3 streets.

== Geography ==
Perovka is located 11 km northeast of Verkhnyaya Khava (the district's administrative centre) by road. Bolshaya Mikhaylovka is the nearest rural locality.
