= Tecovas Formation =

Geological formation in Texas

- Stratigraphic range: middle Norian, 221.5–216 Ma
- Type: Geological formation
- Unit of: Dockum Group
- Underlies: Trujillo Formation
- Overlies: Santa Rosa Formation and Camp Springs Formation

Location
- Region: Texas, Crosby County
- Country: United States

The Tecovas Formation is a geological formation in the Texas panhandle and eastern New Mexico. It is one of several formations encompassed by the Late Triassic Dockum Group.

The lower unit of the Cooper Canyon Formation in Garza County to the south is stratigraphically equivalent to the Tecovas Formation. It is also contiguous with the Garita Creek Formation of New Mexico, as well as partially to the Santa Rosa Formation. The Tecovas Formation preserves fossils from the Adamanian faunal stage, which dates to the middle Norian.

== Vertebrate fauna ==
Vertebrates of the Tecovas Formation
Taxa	Presence	Notes	Images
Adelobasileus		A mammaliamorph	
Caseosaurus		A herrerasaurid similar to Chindesaurus	Caseosaurus holotype ilium UMMP 8870
Postosuchus		A rauisuchian	
Tecovasaurus		An amniote (probably an archosauriform)	
Tecovaserpeton		A metoposaurid temnospondyl	
Tecovasuchus		An aetosaur belonging to Paratypothoracisini	
Soumyasaurus		A silesaurid	

== See also ==
- List of dinosaur-bearing rock formations
