= Redonda Formation =

Geologic formation exposed in eastern New Mexico

- Stratigraphic range: Norian; ~221–206 Ma
- Type: Formation
- Unit of: Chinle Group
- Sub-units: Duke Ranch, Quay, Red Peak, San Jon Creek & Wallace Ranch members
- Underlies: Entrada Formation
- Overlies: Bull Canyon Formation
- Thickness: 25–425 feet (7.6–129.5 m)

Lithology
- Primary: Shale
- Other: Limestone, sandstone

Location
- Coordinates: 34.965°N 103.701°W
- Approximate paleocoordinates: 9.9°N 43.2°W
- Region: New Mexico
- Country: United States

Type section
- Named for: Redonda Mesa
- Named by: Dobrovolny and Summerson
- Year defined: 1946
- Redonda Formation (the United States) Redonda Formation (New Mexico)

The Redonda Formation is a geologic formation exposed in eastern New Mexico. It contains vertebrate fossils of the late Triassic Period. Fossil theropod tracks have been reported from the formation.

== Description ==
The formation consists of interbedded fine-grained red-brown sandstone and mudstone. It conformably overlies the Bull Canyon Formation and underlies the Entrada Formation.

The formation is interpreted as having been deposited in a lake with an area of about 5,000 square kilometres (1,900 sq mi).

== Fossils ==
The formation has few fossil plants, with only Neocalamites reported, but it contains abundant invertebrate fossils (conchostracans and ostracods) and a diverse assemblage of vertebrate fossils.

=== Vertebrate fauna ===
==== Fish ====
fish of the Redonda Formation
Taxa	Presence	Notes	Images
Cionichthys	Skull fragments	A redfieldiid	Semionotus
Ceratodus		A lungfish	Semionotus
Coelacanthidae indet.	Fragmentary material	Possibly assignable to Chinlea or Quayia	Semionotus
Hemicalypterus	scales	A dapediid	Semionotus
Semionotus	Abundant, found in large deathbeds	A semionotid	Semionotus
Synornichthys	Skull fragments	A redfieldiid	Semionotus

==== Stereospondyls ====
Stereospondyls of the Redonda Formation
Taxa	Presence	Notes	Images
Apachesaurus	Numerous specimens	A metoposaurid, possibly juveniles of Koskinonodon	Apachesaurus

==== Synapsids ====
Synapsids of the Redonda Formation
Taxa	Presence	Notes	Images
Redondagnathus	teeth	A trirachodontid cynodont	

==== Archosauriforms ====
Archosauriforms of the Redonda Formation
Taxa	Presence	Notes	Images
Apachesuchus	Osteoderms	An aetosaur similar to Neoaetosauroides	Redondasaurus Vancleavea
Redondasaurus	Numerous skulls and other skeletal remains	A phytosaur	Redondasaurus Vancleavea
Redondasuchus	Osteoderms and other fragments	A typothoracisine aetosaur related to Typothorax	Redondasaurus Vancleavea
Redondavenator	Snout bones and a scapulocoracoid	A large, predatory basal crocodylomorph	Redondasaurus Vancleavea
Vancleavea	Osteoderms	An unusual non-archosaurian archosauriform	Redondasaurus Vancleavea

== History of investigation ==
The unit was first named as the Redonda Member of the Chinle Formation by Dobrovolny and Summerson in 1947. Griggs and Read raised the unit to formation rank in 1959, and also assigned an age of late Triassic based on the presence of tracks of a bipedal dinosaur and of a phytosaur skull.

== See also ==
- List of dinosaur-bearing rock formations
  - List of stratigraphic units with theropod tracks
