= Camp Springs Formation =

Geologic formation in Texas, United States

- Stratigraphic range: Late Triassic, 230–220 Ma
- Type: Formation

Location
- Region: Texas
- Country: United States

The Camp Springs Formation is a geologic formation in the Dockum Group of Texas. It preserves fossils dating back to the Late Triassic. It has also been known as the Camp Springs Conglomerate or Camp Springs Member. The unit was originally named for an unknown locality in West Texas, and was later used in reference to sandstone and conglomerate deposits in Scurry County. It is likely equivalent to the basal beds (Tecolotito Member) of the Santa Rosa Formation, and some authors have suggested abandoning the usage of the term "Camp Springs Formation" and similar names.

== Paleobiota ==
Extinct taxa of the Camp Springs Conglomerate
Genus / Taxon	Species	Material	Notes	Images
Buettnererpeton	B. bakeri		A metoposaurid temnospondyl amphibian known from the Elkins Place bone bed. Previously considered a species of Metoposaurus.	
Wannia	W. scurriensis		A basal (non-mystriosuchine) phytosaur. Previously considered a species of Paleorhinus.	

== See also ==
- List of fossiliferous stratigraphic units in Texas
- Paleontology in Texas
