= Santa Rosa Formation, New Mexico =

Geologic formation in New Mexico, United States

Santa Rosa Formation
- Stratigraphic range: Carnian
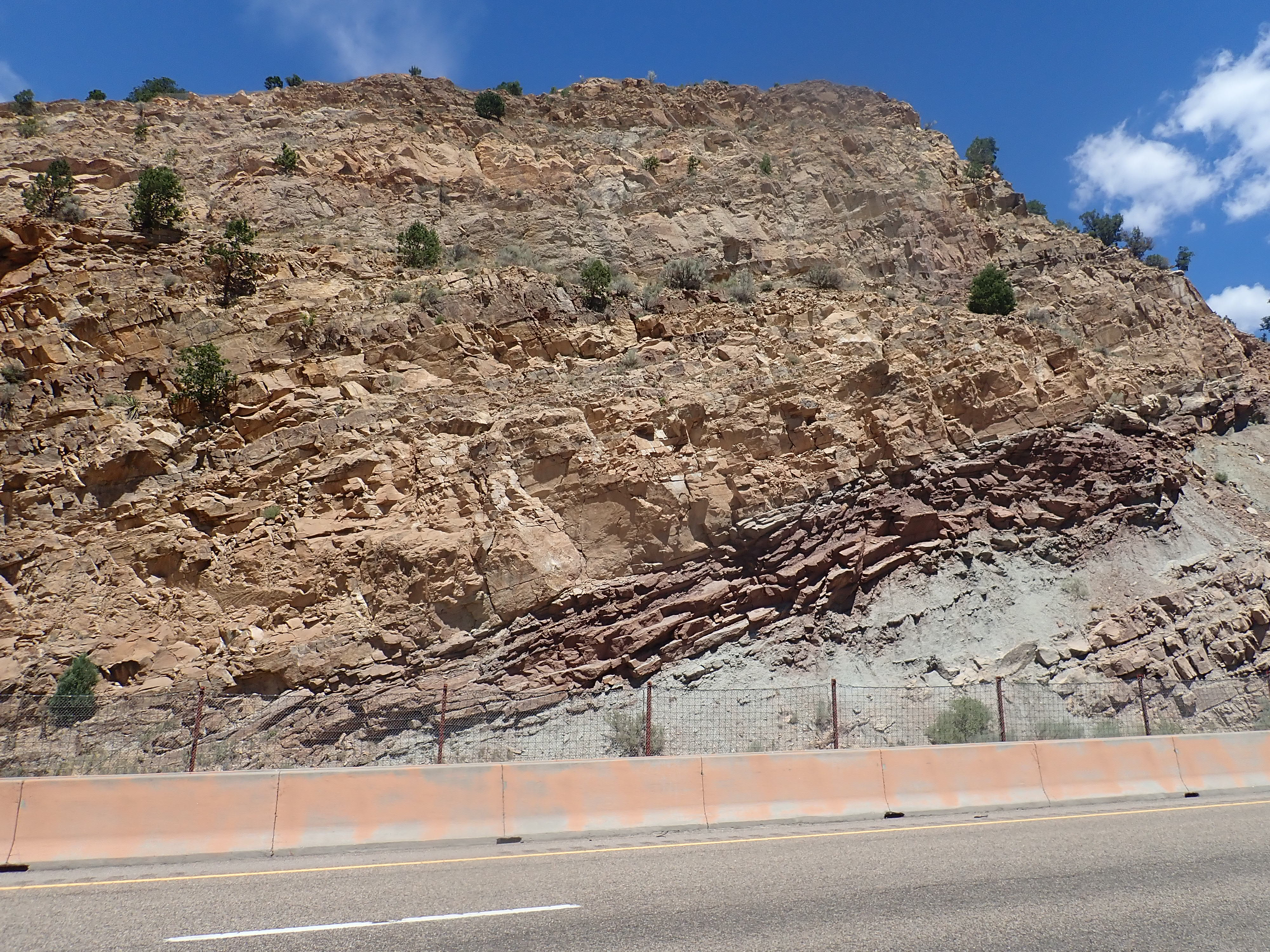
- Santa Rosa Formation along I-25 in Glorieta Pass.
- Type: Formation
- Sub-units: Tecolotito Member, Los Esteros Member, Tres Lagunas Member
- Underlies: Garita Creek Formation
- Overlies: Anton Chico Formation
- Thickness: 32 meters (105 ft)

Lithology
- Primary: Sandstone, mudstone
- Other: Conglomerate

Location
- Coordinates: 34.9620°N 104.6902°W
- Region: New Mexico, Texas
- Country: United States

Type section
- Named for: Santa Rosa, New Mexico
- Named by: N.H. Dalton
- Year defined: 1919
- Santa Rosa Formation, New Mexico (the United States) Santa Rosa Formation, New Mexico (New Mexico)

The Santa Rosa Formation is a geologic formation exposed in New Mexico that was deposited in the Carnian Age of the late Triassic Period.

== Description ==
The formation consists mostly of white to brown sandstone and mudstone with some interbedded conglomerate. The formation lies on the Anton Chico Formation and is overlain by the Garita Creek Formation. The total thickness of the formation is 32 meters (105 ft).

The formation is divided into (in ascending stratigraphic order) the Tecolotito Member, which is primarily sandstone; the Los Esteros Member, which is primarily mudstone; and the Tres Lagunas Member, which is primarily sandstone.

The sandstone members are interpreted as alluvial sheets deposited by braided streams. The Los Esteros Member is interpreted as a lacustrine deposit in lakes that formed due to local subsidence from dissolution of underlying Permian salt beds. Paleocurrents were primarily to the south in the Tecolotito Member and northeast in the Tres Lagunas Member but are indeterminate in the Los Esteros Member.

== Fossils ==
The Los Esteros Member has yielded fossils of the fern Cynepteria lasiophora, the cycad Zamites powelli, the conifer Pelourdea pleoensis, the gymnosperm Dinophyton spinusos, and seeds (Samaropsis).

This member also includes a microvertebrate site in Santa Fe County, New Mexico that has yielded a diverse fossil assemblage. Fish fossils include lungfish toothplates of Arganodus dorothea, a redfieldiid dermopteric, and scales from Turseodus, including from coprolites. Amphibian fossil fragments are probably from Buttneria perfecta and Apachesaurus gregorii. Reptiles include Trilophosaurus, indeterminate phytosaurs, Desmatosuchus haplocerus, Stagonolepis wellesii, several new aetosaurs, Chatterjeea elegans, Hesperosuchus, and Parrishia mcreai. Synapsids are represented by an indeterminate kannemeyeriiform dicynodont and an unnamed cynodont.

In east-central New Mexico, the Los Esteros Member has also yielded a Otischalkian dinosauromorph assemblage that includes specimens of Silesauridae and Lagerpetidae, including Dromomeron, the latter of unusually large size.

== History of investigation ==
The formation was first named as the Santa Rosa Sandstone by N.H. Darton in July 1919 but the report was not published until 1922. By then the name had already appeared in other publications. A type locality was not formally designated until 1972. In 1987, Spencer G. Lucas and Adrian Hunt removed the lower sandstone beds into the Anton Chico Formation and divided the remaining beds into members. W.I. Finch and coinvestigators redesignated the unit as the Santa Rosa Formation in 1988.
