= Trujillo Formation =

Geologic formation in Texas and New Mexico, US

- Stratigraphic range: Late Triassic, 216–203 Ma
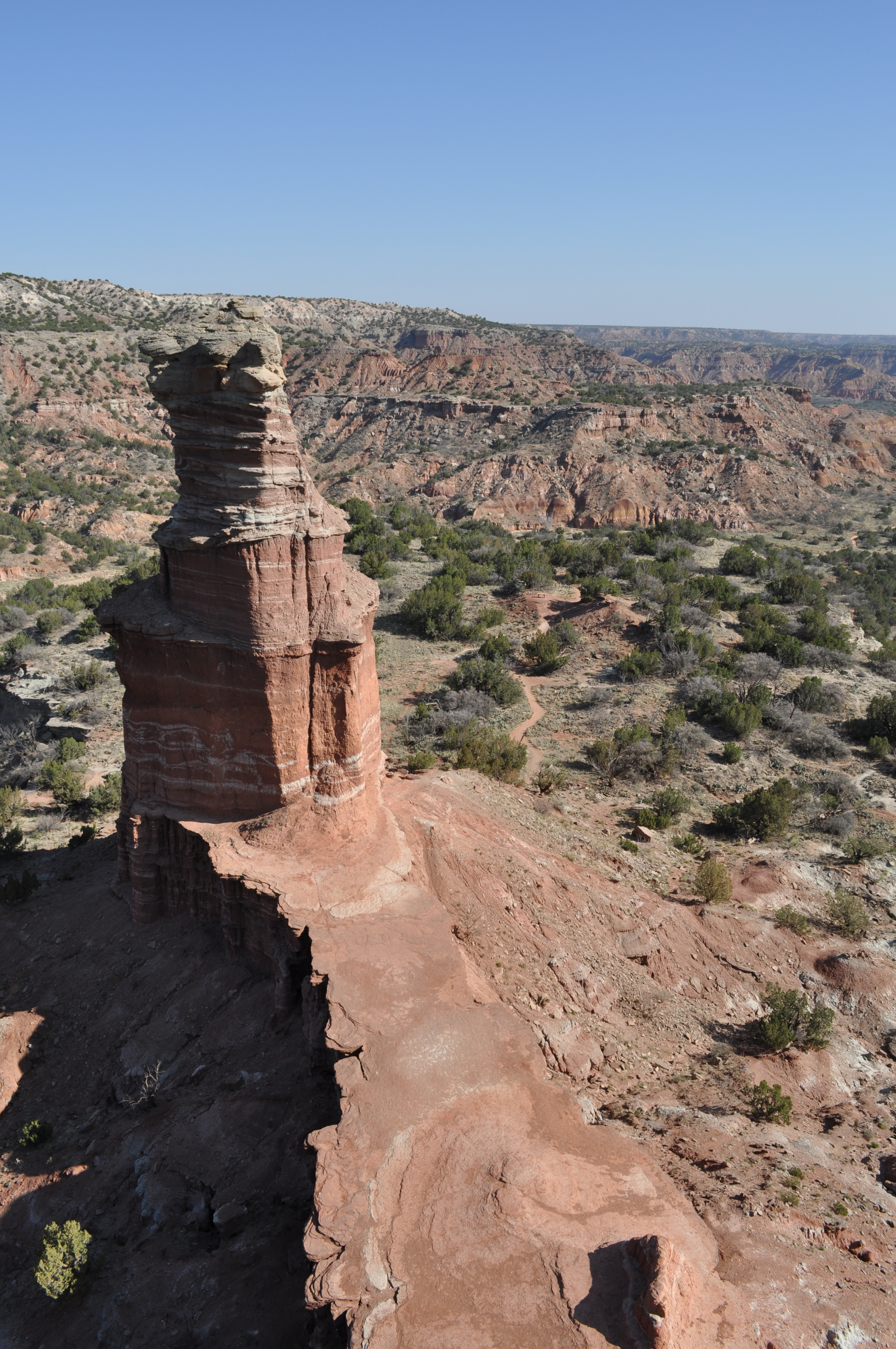
- Trujillo Formation in Texas
- Type: Formation
- Unit of: Dockum Group
- Overlies: Tecovas Formation
- Thickness: 45–210 feet (14–64 m)

Lithology
- Primary: Sandstone
- Other: conglomerate, mudstone

Location
- Coordinates: 35.2501°N 103.0318°W
- Region: Texas; New Mexico
- Country: United States

Type section
- Named for: Trujillo Creek
- Named by: C.N. Gould
- Year defined: 1907
- Trujillo Formation (the United States) Trujillo Formation (Texas)

The Trujillo Formation is a geologic formation in Texas and New Mexico. It preserves fossils dating back to the upper Triassic period. It is also known as the Trujillo Sandstone.

== Description ==
The formation consists mostly of gray to brown or red sandstone, but with some conglomerate and mudstone. Conglomerate is more common in the middle beds while mudstone is more common in the middle and upper beds. The sandstone is typically crossbedded and is fine-grained in the lower beds and more coarse in the middle and upper beds. The lower sandstone beds tend to form a prominent cliff. The total thickness varies from 45–210 feet (14–64 m). The formation overlies the Tecovas Formation.

The Cuervo Sandstone Member is preempted by the Trujillo Formation.

The formation crops out along Palo Duro Canyon and the Canadian River and their tributaries. It is also widespread in the Sangre de Cristo Mountains.

The formation is interpreted as deposition in a braided stream system. The lower beds at Palo Duro Canyon contain unusual cone-shaped iron concretions that likely formed in the vadose zone.

== Fossils ==
The formation contains Typothorax scutes and the unusual cycad Sanmiguelia.

== History of investigation ==
The formation was first named as the upper formation of the Dockum Group in 1907 by C.N. Gould.

== See also ==
- List of fossiliferous stratigraphic units in Texas
- Paleontology in Texas
