= Paleobiota of the Chinle Formation =

The Chinle Formation is an extensive geological unit in the southwestern United States, preserving a very diverse fauna of Late Triassic (primarily Norian-age) animals and plants. This is a list of fossilized organisms recovered from the formation.

== Amniotes ==
=== Archosauromorphs ===
==== Phytosaurs ====
Phytosaurs of the Chinle Formation
Genus	Species	State	Member	Abundance	Notes	Images
Leptosuchus	L. crosbiensis	Arizona	Sonsela; Blue Mesa; Mesa Redondo		A basal leptosuchomorph related to Smilosuchus.	
Machaeroprosopus	M. buceros	Arizona; New Mexico	Owl Rock; Petrified Forest; Sonsela		A mystriosuchin. The type species of Machaeroprosopus.	
Machaeroprosopus	M. jablonskiae	Arizona	Sonsela	Partial skull	An early-diverging mystriosuchin.	
Machaeroprosopus	M. mccauleyi	Arizona	Owl Rock; Petrified Forest; Sonsela		A mystriosuchin.	
Machaeroprosopus	M. pristinus	Arizona	Owl Rock; Petrified Forest; Sonsela		A mystriosuchin. The type species of "Pseudopalatus", which is now considered a synonym of Machaeroprosopus.	
cf. Paleorhinus	Indeterminate	Arizona	Mesa Redondo			
Pravusuchus	P. hortus	Arizona	Sonsela	Three skulls.	A basal leptosuchomorph closely related to Mystriosuchini or Nicrosaurus.	
Protome	P. batalaria	Arizona	Sonsela	Partial skull and jaw.	A phytosaur originally described as a juvenile Leptosuchus, but probably an unrelated non-leptosuchomorph or mystriosuchin.	
Redondasaurus	R. gregorii	Arizona; Utah	"Siltstone" / Rock Point; Petrified Forest; Church Rock		A large late-surviving mystriosuchin. Either a close relative of Machaeroprosopus (formerly known as Pseudopalatus), or a subgenus of that taxon.	
Smilosuchus	S. adamanensis	Arizona	Sonsela; Blue Mesa; Mesa Redondo	Known from a single skull	Previously referred to Leptosuchus, actually referable to Smilosuchus.	
Smilosuchus	S. gregorii	Arizona	Sonsela; Blue Mesa; Mesa Redondo	Known from a handful of skulls.	A basal leptosuchomorph, split off from Leptosuchus.	
Smilosuchus	S. lithodendrorum	Arizona	Blue Mesa	Known from only one skull.	Previously considered synonymous with S. adamanensis.	

==== Suchians ====
Color key: Taxon / Reclassified taxon / Taxon falsely reported as present / Dubious taxon or junior synonym / Ichnotaxon / Ootaxon / Morphotaxon	Notes; Uncertain or tentative taxa are in small text; ~~crossed out~~ taxa are discredited.

Suchians of the Chinle Formation
Genus	Species	State	Member	Abundance	Notes	Images
Acaenasuchus	A. geoffreyi	Arizona	Sonsela; Blue Mesa; Mesa Redondo	Known from a handful of isolated osteoderms.	A controversial suchian based primarily on osteoderms. Some paleontologists have considered Acaenasuchus to be juvenile Desmatosuchus haplocerus scutes, while others considered it a separate genus of small aetosaurs. In 2020 it was redescribed as an aetosauriform related to, but not within, Aetosauria. It is also related to Revueltosaurus (also from the Chinle) and the armored reptile Euscolosuchus from Virginia.	
Adamanasuchus	A. eisenhardtae	Arizona	Blue Mesa	Osteoderms and skull and postcranial fragments.	A basal desmatosuchine aetosaur related to Calyptosuchus and Scutarx.	
Calyptosuchus	C. wellesi	Arizona	Blue Mesa	Common, although "non-armor material is comparatively rare".	A basal desmatosuchine aetosaur originally considered a species of Stagonolepis.	
Desmatosuchus	D. spurensis	Arizona	Blue Mesa	Numerous osteoderms and other skeletal material	A large desmatosuchin aetosaur which was fairly common in the lower part of the Chinle Formation. Prior to 2008, fossils of D. spurensis were listed as the species D. haplocerus, until it was determined that D. haplocerus was a species name originally based on undiagnostic fossils.	
Desmatosuchus	D. smalli	Arizona	Sonsela?	A single lateral osteoderm.	A desmatosuchin aetosaur which is very rare in the Chinle Formation. One of the youngest known occurrences of the genus Desmatosuchus.	
Effigia	E. okeeffeae	New Mexico	"Siltstone"		A six-foot-long shuvosaurid from the Coelophysis quarry of Ghost Ranch.	
Eosphorosuchus	E. lacrimosa	New Mexico	"Siltstone" / Rock Point	Partial skull, a cervical vertebra, pubes, left hindlimb and three osteoderms	An early crocodylomorph from the Coelophysis quarry of Ghost Ranch. It had a short and reinforced facial region, likely adapted for powerful bites.	
Hesperosuchus	H. agilis	Arizona	Petrified Forest; Blue Mesa; Mesa Redondo		An early-diverging crocodylomorph	
Kryphioparma	K. caerula	Arizona	Blue Mesa	Osteoderms.	An aetosaur described in 2023, probably related to other typothoracines.	
Labrujasuchus	L. expectatus	New Mexico	Petrified Forest	Partial skeleton and other postcrania	A shuvosaurid from the Hayden Quarry of Ghost Ranch.	
Paratypothorax	P. andressorum	Arizona	Blue Mesa; Sonsela	Osteoderms	A significant number of researchers feel that the North American material referred to the German Paratypothorax species P. andressorum by Hunt and Lucas in 1992 is actually distinct.	
Paratypothorax	Indeterminate	Arizona; New Mexico	Sonsela	Osteoderms and minor postcranial fragments.	A paratypothoracin typothoracine aetosaur known from isolated material similar to more complete specimens from Germany.	
Parrishia	P. mccreai	Arizona	Blue Mesa; Mesa Redondo		A dubious genus of crocodylomorph, known from isolated vertebrae	
Poposaurus	P. gracilis	Arizona	Blue Mesa; Mesa Redondo		A poposaurid pseudosuchian.	
Postosuchus	P. kirkpatricki	Arizona	Owl Rock; Petrified Forest; Sonsela; Blue Mesa; Mesa Redondo		A rauisuchid. "Rauisuchian" fossils from the Chinle are commonly referred to Postosuchus, under the assumption that it was the only large rauisuchian in the formation. The recognition of Vivaron indicates that this is not the case. Less ambiguous Postosuchus fossils are known from Texas.	
Revueltosaurus	R. callenderi	Arizona	Petrified Forest		A suchian with extensive armor and adaptations for herbivory, including teeth initially mistaken as belonging to ornithischian dinosaurs. It was probably an aetosauriform (aetosaur relative).	
Revueltosaurus	R. hunti	Arizona	Blue Mesa		A suchian with extensive armor and adaptations for herbivory, including teeth initially mistaken as belonging to ornithischian dinosaurs. It was probably an aetosauriform (aetosaur relative).	
Rioarribasuchus	R. chamaensis	Arizona; New Mexico	Petrified Forest; Sonsela	Osteoderms and possible ankle and vertebrae remains.	A late-surviving paratypothoracin typothoracine aetosaur. Originally referred to Desmatosuchus, but later reinterpreted as a relative of Paratypothorax based on a phylogenetic analysis performed on the remains by Parker in 2003. New genus names were erected independently by Parker (coining the name Heliocanthus) and Lucas et al. (coining the name Rioarribasuchus), prompting an investigation into reports of unethical taxonomic claim-jumping by the latter party.	
Saurosuchus	Indeterminate	Arizona	Blue Mesa	Jaw fragment.	Identified from a fossil which has been reinterpreted as an indeterminate "rauisuchian".	
Scutarx	S. deltatylus	Arizona	Sonsela	Four partial skeletons including skull fragments.	A large basal desmatosuchine aetosaur based on fossils originally referred to "Stagonolepis" (=Calyptosuchus) wellesi, a close relative. Fossils of Scutarx represent the highest stratigraphic occurrence of Stagonolepis-like aetosaurs in Petrified Forest National Park.	
Shuvosaurus	S. inexpectatus	Arizona	Owl Rock; Petrified Forest; Mesa Redondo		Following a rediagnosis of the genus and species, only shuvosaurid fossils from the Cooper Canyon Formation are reliably identifiable as Shuvosaurus itself.	
Sonselasuchus	S. cedrus	Arizona	Sonsela	More than 950 disassociated and non-articulated bones belonging to at least 36 individuals	A shuvosaurid that may have shifted from quadrupedal to bipedal locomotion through ontogeny.	
Stenomyti	S. huangae	Colorado	"Red siltstone"	Partial skeleton including a well-preserved skull.	A small aetosaurine aetosaur similar to Aetosaurus.	
Typothorax	T. coccinarum	Arizona	Owl Rock; Petrified Forest; Sonsela	Common in the Owl Rock and Petrified Forest Members.	A large, wide-bodied typothoracine aetosaur abundant throughout the Chinle Formation. Almost all of the known Chinle Typothorax fossils are isolated whole or fragmentary osteoderms.	
Tecovasuchus	T. chatterjeei	Arizona	Blue Mesa	Osteoderms.	A paratypothoracin aetosaur, previously thought to be more widespread in the formation.	
Vivaron	V. haydeni	New Mexico	Petrified Forest	Skull fragments and hip bones	A large rauisuchid from the Hayden Quarry of Ghost Ranch, similar to Postosuchus.	

==== Ornithodirans ====
"Prosauropod" tracks are present in the Redonda, Sloan Canyon, and Sheep Pen Sandstone formations, though these geological units are typically regarded as part of the Dockum Group rather than the Chinle Formation. Prosauropod tracks might be present in the Rock Point Formation as well. Geographically, the tracks are present in New Mexico.

Theropod tracks have been found in Utah and New Mexico recovered from the Redonda, Sloan Canyon, and Sheep Pen Sandstone formations. Indeterminate theropod remains are present throughout unambiguous strata of the Chinle Formation, including the Petrified Forest, Bluewater Creek, and Rock Point members of New Mexico.

Color key: Taxon / Reclassified taxon / Taxon falsely reported as present / Dubious taxon or junior synonym / Ichnotaxon / Ootaxon / Morphotaxon	Notes; Uncertain or tentative taxa are in small text; ~~crossed out~~ taxa are discredited.

Ornithodirans of the Chinle Formation
Genus	Species	State	Member	Abundance	Notes	Images
Camposaurus	C. arizonensis	Arizona	Bluewater Creek Formation (or Blue Mesa)		A coelophysine coelophysid from the Placerias Quarry.	
Chindesaurus	C. bryansmalli	Arizona	Petrified Forest		A large saurischian with similarities to herrerasaurids and Tawa hallae.	
Coelophysis	C. bauri	New Mexico	"Siltstone"; Petrified Forest		A coelophysid. Though originally based on rare fragments, in the 1940s numerous skeletons of C. bauri were discovered in a bonebed at Ghost Ranch in New Mexico	
Coelophysis	C. sp.	Arizona	Petrified Forest		Originally assigned to C. bauri, but likely a different taxon.	
Coelophysis	C. longicollis	New Mexico	Petrified Forest		Now considered a junior synonym of C. bauri.	
Coelophysis	C. willistoni	New Mexico	Petrified Forest		Now considered a junior synonym of C. bauri.	
Dromomeron	D. romeri	Arizona; Colorado; New Mexico	Petrified Forest (Hayden Quarry #3); Owl Rock; "Red siltstone"		A lagerpetid pterosauromorph found at various Ghost Ranch quarries and elsewhere in the Chinle Formation.	
Daemonosaurus	D. chauliodus	New Mexico	"Siltstone"	Skull and neck vertebrae fragments	A saurischian from the Coelophysis Quarry. with a short skull and enlarged teeth.	
Eotephradactylus	E. mcintireae	Arizona	Owl Rock	Partial mandible, teeth, and wing finger bone	An early-diverging pterosaur	
Eucoelophysis	E. baldwini	New Mexico	Petrified Forest		A silesaurid dinosauriform closely related to the Polish genus Silesaurus.	
Kwanasaurus	K. williamparkeri	Colorado	"Red siltstone"		A silesaurid dinosauriform with adaptations for herbivory.	
Ptychotherates	P. bucculentus	New Mexico	"Siltstone"	A single partial skull	A short-skulled saurischian from the Coelophysis Quarry. Likely related to Chindesaurus, Daemonosaurus, and Tawa.	
Tawa	T. hallae	New Mexico	Petrified Forest (Hayden Quarry)		A saurischian showing a mosaic of features similar to neotheropods and herrerasaurids.	

==== Other archosauromorphs ====
Non-crurotarsan archosauromorphs of the Chinle Formation
Genus	Species	State	Member	Abundance	Notes	Images
Akidostropheus	A. oligos	Arizona	Blue Mesa	Cervical, dorsal, and caudal vertebrae	A tanystropheid archosauromorph bearing elongated spikes on the vertebral neural spines	
Crosbysaurus	C. harrisae	Arizona; Utah	Blue Mesa	Teeth	An archosauriform represented only by teeth. It is treated as indeterminate archosauriform remains by Irmis in 2005. It was originally thought to be an ornithischian dinosaur.	
Doswellia	cf. D. kaltenbachi	Arizona	Blue Mesa	Osteoderms, vertebrae, rib and hip fragments.	A doswelliid archosauriform.	
Puercosuchus	P. traverorum	Arizona	Blue Mesa	Two monodominant bonebeds.	A carnivorous malerisaurine azendohsaurid archosauromorph.	
Rugarhynchos	R. sixmilensis	New Mexico	Bluewater Creek	Skull and postcranial fragments.	A doswelliid archosauriform. Originally described as a species of Doswellia, but subsequently transferred to a separate genus.	
Syntomiprosopus	S. sucherorum	Arizona	Blue Mesa or Sonsela	Two to four individuals from a single quarry.	A short-faced archosauriform from the Placerias / Downs' Quarry. Possibly an unusual early-diverging crocodylomorph. Appears convergent with some Late Cretaceous notosuchians.	
Tanystropheidae	Indeterminate	New Mexico	Petrified Forest	Vertebrae	Moderately-sized tanystropheid vertebrae from the Hayden Quarry, likely representing a new taxon closely related to Langobardisaurus and Tanytrachelos.	
cf. Tanystropheus	Indeterminate	Arizona	Blue Mesa	Cervical vertebrae	Tanystropheid neck vertebrae similar to Tanystropheus, but much smaller and later in time than any other Tanystropheus fossils.	
Tanytrachelos	Indeterminate / T. ahynis	New Mexico; Arizona	Petrified Forest; Mesa Redondo	Cervical rib, calcaneum, etc.	A small tanystropheid represented by several hundred fossil specimens.	
Tecovasaurus	T. murryi	Arizona	Mesa Redondo		An unknown amniote represented by scattered teeth formerly believed to be from an ornithischian dinosaur. Later discoveries of similar teeth in pseudosuchians meant that these could no longer be regarded as anything more specific than some kind of archosauriform.	
Trilophosaurus	T. buettneri	Arizona	Blue Mesa		A trilophosaurid.	
Trilophosaurus	T. dornorum	Arizona	Sonsela		A trilophosaurid.	
Trilophosaurus	T. jacobsi	Arizona	Blue Mesa; Mesa Redondo		A trilophosaurid.	
Trilophosaurus	T. phasmalophos	Arizona	Sonsela		A late-surviving trilophosaurid.	
Vancleavea	V. campi	Arizona; New Mexico	"Siltstone"; Petrified Forest; Sonsela; Blue Mesa		A strange aquatic carnivorous archosauriform, represented by both articulated skeletons and scattered elements like osteoderms and vertebrae.	

=== Other reptiles ===
Other reptiles of the Chinle Formation
Genus	Species	State	Member	Abundance	Notes	Images
Acallosuchus	A. rectori	Arizona	Blue Mesa	Known only from a partial skull.	A strange neodiapsid whose bones were heavily ornamented "with subtriangular knobs... running the length of the bones." Even these ornamentations were ornamented "with additional grooves." It is too bizarre to be currently classified as anything more than a probable diapsid.	
Ancistronychus	A. paradoxus	Arizona	Sonsela	Manual unguals (hand claws).	A drepanosaur related to Drepanosaurus.	
Avicranium	A. renestoi	New Mexico	"Siltstone"	Skull and neck vertebrae.	A drepanosaur with a toothless skull and a flexible neck owing to the heterocoelous (saddle-shaped) articular surfaces of the vertebral centrae. The neural spines are anteroposteriorly short and strongly anterodorsally inclined. These features closely resemble those of Drepanosaurus.	
cf. Chinlechelys.	cf. C. tenertesta	Arizona	Owl Rock	Parts of carapaces, cervical osteoderms, a skull roof fragment, left pelvic girdle, a caudal vertebra, a possible squamosal	A terrestrial testudinate (shelled stem-turtle).	
Colognathus	C. obscurus	Arizona	Blue Mesa	Known only from a jaw fragment and some isolated teeth.	Originally believed to be a fish, Colognathus was a strange amniote with distinctive fluted teeth.	
Dolabrosaurus	D. aquatilis	New Mexico	Petrified Forest	Articulated vertebral and limb material.	A drepanosaur.	
Drepanosaurus	D. unguicaudatus	New Mexico	Petrified Forest		A drepanosaur.	
Fabanychus	F. monos	Arizona	Sonsela		A drepanosaur.	
Microzemiotes	M. sonselaensis	Arizona	Sonsela	Partial left dentary with three teeth	A diapsid reptile of uncertain affinities.	
Palacrodon	P. parkeri	Arizona	Blue Mesa	Jaw fragments.	A diapsid reptile of uncertain phylogenetic placement with unusual broadened teeth. More complete fossils of this genus from the Fremouw Formation of Antarctica suggest that it was an arboreal saurian.	
Skybalonyx	S. skapter	Arizona	Blue Mesa	Manual unguals (hand claws).	A drepanosaur which likely had a burrowing lifestyle.	
Uatchitodon	U. schneideri	Arizona	Mesa Redondo	Known in Chinle from only a single tooth. The presence of venom channels is consistent with other known Uatchitodon specimens, although the Chinle specimen's channels are unique in being "completely enclosed under the surface of the crown."	A reptile of unknown affinities, probably a carnivorous archosauromorph with venomous capabilities.	
Whitakersaurus	W. bermani	New Mexico	"Siltstone"		A rhynchocephalian found at Ghost Ranch.	
Leptopleuronine indet.	Indeterminate	Utah	Owl Rock	An incomplete skull (specimen MNA V9953)	Inteterminate leptopleurine procolophonids.	
Leptopleuronine indet.	Indeterminate	Arizona	Owl Rock	Two skulls (specimens MCZ 9312 and 9313)	Inteterminate leptopleurine procolophonids.	
Sphenodontia sp.	Indeterminate	Arizona	Owl Rock	A dentary.	An indeterminate rhynchocephalian.	

=== Synapsids ===
Synapsids of the Chinle Formation
Genus	Species	State	Member	Abundance	Notes	Images
Kataigidodon	K. venetus	Arizona	Blue Mesa	Partial dentaries.	A non-mammalian eucynodont.	
Kraterokheirodon	K. colberti	Arizona	Petrified Forest; Blue Mesa or Mesa Redondo	Known only from two teeth.	A possible cynodont. Although they share some similarities with cynodont teeth, the teeth of Kraterokheirodon are very distinctive and can't be confidently referred to a known amniote group.	
Placerias	P. hesternus	Arizona	Blue Mesa; Mesa Redondo	Known from several hundred remains, but very rare outside of the highly concentrated Placerias Quarry bonebed.	A placeriine stahleckeriid dicynodont.	

== Amphibians ==
Color key: Taxon / Reclassified taxon / Taxon falsely reported as present / Dubious taxon or junior synonym / Ichnotaxon / Ootaxon / Morphotaxon	Notes; Uncertain or tentative taxa are in small text; ~~crossed out~~ taxa are discredited.

Amphibians of the Chinle Formation
Genus	Species	State	Member	Abundance	Notes	Images
Apachesaurus	A. gregorii	Arizona	Owl Rock; Petrified Forest; Blue Mesa	Common in the Owl Rock and Petrified forest members. Blue Mesa remains are fragmentary.	A metoposaurid temnospondyl which is a junior synonym of Anaschisma	
Anaschisma	A. browni	Arizona	Owl Rock; Petrified Forest; Sonsela; Blue Mesa; Mesa Redondo	A. browni is "possibly the most common tetrapod fossil in the lower Chinle", although its presence in the upper Chinle is "unclear".	A metoposaurid temnospondyl. Koskinonodon was erected for the species "Buettneria" perfecta when it was discovered that the latter genus was preoccupied. Gee et al., 2017 then synonymised it with Anaschisma.	
Chinlestegophis	C. jenkinsi	Colorado	"Red siltstone"		A temnospondyl in the group Stereospondyli, related to Rileymillerus from the Dockum Group of Texas. Originally interpreted as a stem-caecilian, though others have disputed this finding.	
Funcusvermis	F. gilmorei	Arizona	Blue Mesa	Numerous jaw fragments, as well as a referred maxillopalatine, vertebra, and femur	A stem-caecilian	
Salientia indet.	Indeterminate	Arizona	Sonsela Member; Blue Mesa Member	Five bones: four ilia and a partial maxilla.	A stem-group frog. Might be more closely related to crown-group frogs (anurans) than to Early Triassic taxa Triadobatrachus and Czatkobatrachus.	

== Cartilaginous fish ==
Chondrichthyans of the Chinle Formation
Genus	Species	State	Stratigraphic position	Abundance	Notes	Images
Acrodus	Indeterminate	Arizona	~~Petrified Forest~~; ~~Sonsela~~; Mesa Redondo	Only a single tooth is known.	A hybodontiform shark.	Xenacanthus, relative of Mooreodontus
Lonchidion	L. humblei	Arizona	Blue Mesa; Mesa Redondo		A hybodontiform shark. Lonchidion remains are common throughout the microvertebrate sites of the American southwest.	Xenacanthus, relative of Mooreodontus
Lonchidion	L. minimorsus	Arizona	Sonsela	Teeth	A hybodontiform shark. Lonchidion remains are common throughout the microvertebrate sites of the American southwest.	Xenacanthus, relative of Mooreodontus
Palaeoxyris	P. humblei	Arizona	Blue Mesa	Several specimens	An egg capsule of a freshwater hybodont shark.	Xenacanthus, relative of Mooreodontus
"Phoebodus"	Indeterminate	Arizona	Mesa Redondo	Only a single specimen has been recovered from the formation.	Triassic records of "Phoebodus" from Europe are reclassified to genus Keuperodus, and if this specimen also can be attributed to Keuperodus, this would be the first record from North America.	Xenacanthus, relative of Mooreodontus
Reticulodus	R. synergus	Arizona	Owl Rock; Petrified Forest; Sonsela		The crown of its tooth bears a "reticulating ornamentation on [its] occlusal surface[.]" Reticulodus remains are common throughout the Norian microvertebrate sites of the American southwest.	Xenacanthus, relative of Mooreodontus
Mooreodontus	M. moorei	Arizona	Blue Mesa; Mesa Redondo	Common in the lower Chinle Formation's microvertebrate localities.	A xenacanthiform shark.	Xenacanthus, relative of Mooreodontus

== Lobe-finned fish ==
=== Coelacanths ===
Actinistians (coelacanths) of the Chinle Formation
Genus	Species	State	Stratigraphic position	Abundance	Notes	Images
Chinlea	C. sorenseni	New Mexico; Utah	Ghost Ranch Quarry; Walt's Fish Quarry; Little Valley; Dolores River Canyon	AMNH 5657; AMNH 5652, 5656, 5660, 5704; AMNH 5653	A freshwater actinisitan (coelacanth).	Chinlea
Chinlea	Indeterminate	Arizona	Owl Rock; Blue Mesa; Ward Terrace; Billingsley Bonebed; Stinking Springs; Placerias Quarry	MNA V346, scale; MNA V7045-7048, isolated quadrates	A freshwater actinisitan (coelacanth).	Chinlea

=== Lungfish ===
Color key: Taxon / Reclassified taxon / Taxon falsely reported as present / Dubious taxon or junior synonym / Ichnotaxon / Ootaxon / Morphotaxon	Notes; Uncertain or tentative taxa are in small text; ~~crossed out~~ taxa are discredited.

Dipnoans (lungfish) of the Chinle Formation
Genus	Species	State	Stratigraphic position	Abundance	Notes
Arganodus	A. dorotheae				
Arganodus	Indeterminate	Arizona	Petrified Forest; Sonsela; Blue Mesa; Mesa Redondo	Arganodus toothplates are the most common fossil in the formation from a non-tetrapod. They are evenly distributed across strata, although some individual localities have very high concentrations.	Most Chinlean Arganodus fossils are isolated tooth plates.
Ceratodus	C. dorotheae				Named by Case in 1921, in the 1980s it was referred to Arganodus.

== Ray-finned fish ==
Actinopterygians (ray-finned fish) of the Chinle Formation
Genus	Species	State	Stratigraphic position	Abundance	Notes	Images
Australosomus	Indeterminate	Arizona	Mesa Redondo	Known only from two vertebrae.		Australosomus Saurichthys
Cionichthys	C. dunklei	Colorado; Utah			A member of Redfieldiiformes.	Australosomus Saurichthys
Hemicalypterus	H. weiri	Utah	Church Rock Member		A member of Dapediiformes.	Australosomus Saurichthys
Lasalichthys	L. hillsi	Utah			A member of Redfieldiiformes.	Australosomus Saurichthys
Lasalichthys	Indeterminate	Arizona	Petrified Forest; Blue Mesa; Mesa Redondo		Represented by isolated scales.	Australosomus Saurichthys
Lophionotus	L. sanjuanensis	Utah	Church Rock Member		A member of Semionotiformes.	Australosomus Saurichthys
Lophionotus	L. chinleana	Utah	Church Rock Member		A member of Semionotiformes.	Australosomus Saurichthys
Saurichthys	Indeterminate	Arizona	Upper Blue Mesa Member		A member of Saurichthyiformes.	Australosomus Saurichthys
Synorichthys	S. stewarti	Colorado; Utah			A member of Redfieldiiformes.	Australosomus Saurichthys
Tanaocrossus	T. kalliokoskii	Colorado			An enigmatic actinopterygian.	Australosomus Saurichthys
Turseodus	T. dolorensis	Colorado			A member of Palaeonisciformes.	Australosomus Saurichthys
Turseodus	Indeterminate	Arizona	Owl Rock; Petrified Forest; Sonsela; Blue Mesa	Common.	Isolated scales from Chinle microvertebrate sites commonly have Turseodus-like ridges, however that feature is not unique to Turseodus and in 2005 Irmis advised researchers to regard them as indeterminate palaeoniscid remains.	Australosomus Saurichthys

== Arthropods ==
Arthropods of the Chinle Formation
Genus	Species	State	Stratigraphic position	Abundance	Notes	Images
Enoplocytia	E. porteri	Arizona	Sonsela?	Single well-preserved fossil	An erymid crayfish	
Paleoscolytus	P. divergus	Arizona	Sonsela		A species of bark beetle, evidenced by trace fossils of tracks made on A. arizonicum specimens.	

== Plants ==
The Chinle Formation has a diverse flora of plant megafossils, though they are concentrated in only a few sites with suitable conditions. One of the most diverse floral communities is found near Fort Wingate, New Mexico. Paleobotanists have traditionally placed the Fort Wingate plant beds into the Monitor Butte Member, though more recently they are placed within the Bluewater Creek Formation, a subunit of the Chinle Formation first defined in 1989. Some Fort Wingate plant fossils belong to the "Lake Ciniza beds", a localized patch of grey mudstone corresponding to an ancient lake.

Another productive areas for plant fossils is Petrified Forest National Park in Arizona. Though petrified wood could be found through the entire stratigraphy of the park, most other plant fossils are exclusive to greenish mudstone layers adjacent to the Newspaper Rock sandstone bed in the Blue Mesa Member (formerly known as the "Lower Petrified Forest").

Conifers are the most common and diverse plants, including petrified wood and leafy branches from massive trees (Araucarioxylon, Pagiophyllum) as well as smaller shrubby forms (Pelourdea). Cycad and bennettitalean leaves and other remains make up a significant portion of the flora (Zamites, Nilssoniopteris, Williamsonia, etc.). Ferns (Cladophlebis, Phlebopteris, Clathropteris, Cynepteris, etc.) are abundant, with a range of growth habits including low shrubs, tree ferns, and palm-like fronds comparable to their modern relatives. Sphenophytes (horsetails: Neocalamites, Equistetites, Schizoneura, etc.) have low diversity but high abundance, and the largest Neocalamites fossils in the Chinle Formation could reach up to 6 meters (20 feet) in height. "Seed ferns" (Chilbinia, Marcouia?) ginkgophytes (Baiera), and small lycopods (Chinlea, Selaginella) were present but uncommon. The flora is rounded out by unusual low-growing gymnosperms such as Sanmiguelia (an angiosperm-like shrub), Dechellyia, and Dinophyton (possible relatives of Gnetales).

The floral composition of the Chinle Formation (and other parts of Late Triassic North America) seem to shift with changes in climate over time. The lowest parts of the Chinle, such as the Shinarump Conglomerate, are dominated by the bennettitalean Eoginkgoites alongside the first occurrence of other persistent plants such as Phlebopteris, Equisetites, and most common conifer species. Subsequent subunits (such as the Blue Mesa Member, Monitor Butte Member, and Bluewater Creek Formation) are much more diverse, with a wide array of humidity-adapted plants making up the typical Chinle flora. This second floral zone is characterized by Dinophyton, a common but enigmatic shrubby gymnosperm. Plant fossils are rare in the upper part of the Chinle Formation, which was presumably much drier than the lower part. In these later layers, by far the most common plant fossils belong to Sanmiguelia (an endemic of southwestern North America) alongside conifers and horsetails.

=== Gymnosperms ===
Gymnosperms of the Chinle Formation
Genus	Species	State	Stratigraphic position	Abundance	Notes	Images
Araucariorhiza	A. joae	Arizona	"Petrified Forest" sensu lato	Uncommon	Roots of conifers similar to modern Araucariaceae. Possibly from the same plant as Araucarioxylon arizonicum.	
Araucarioxylon	A. arizonicum, A. sp.	Arizona; Utah; New Mexico	"Siltstone"; Petrified Forest; Sonsela; Blue Mesa; Bluewater Creek (formerly Monitor Butte); Agua Zarca Sandstone	Abundant	Petrified trunks of large conifers possibly related to modern Araucariaceae. State fossil of Arizona.	Araucarioxylon arizonicum
Araucarites	A. rudicula	Arizona; New Mexico	Blue Mesa; Monitor Butte	Very rare	Large female conifer cones similar to those of araucariacean conifers.	
Aricycas	A. paulae	Arizona	Blue Mesa ( = "Lower Petrified Forest")	Moderately common	Pinnate cycad leaves	
Baiera	B. arizonica	Arizona; New Mexico	Blue Mesa (= "Lower Petrified Forest"); Bluewater Creek ( = "lower red member", formerly Monitor Butte)	Uncommon	Ginkgophyte leaves	
Brachyphyllum	B. sp, B. hegewaldia	Arizona; New Mexico; Utah	Blue Mesa ( = "Lower Petrified Forest"); Agua Zarca Sandstone; Shinarump; Temple Mountain	Uncommon	Conifer leaves and shoots	
Carpolithus	C. chinleana	Arizona	Blue Mesa (= "Lower Petrified Forest")	Rare	Seeds of uncertain affinities	
Cephalotaxopsis	C. sp.	Arizona			Conifer foliage	
Charmorgia	C. dijolli	Arizona	"Petrified Forest" sensu lato	Rare	Short cycad stems	
Chilbinia	C. lichii	Arizona	Shinarump	Rare	An archaic seed fern with seeds and leaves more similar to Carboniferous-Permian seed ferns than to Triassic forms.	
Creberanthus	C. bealeii	Arizona	Blue Mesa	Very rare	Pollen-bearing cones similar to those of some extinct "pteridosperms" (seed ferns). Associated with Alisporites opii, a common palynomorph.	
Dadoxylon	D. chaneyi	Arizona	"Petrified Forest" sensu lato	Very rare	Possible cordaitalean conifer wood.	
Dechellyia	D. gormanii	Arizona; New Mexico	Bluewater Creek (formerly Monitor Butte); Monitor Butte	Uncommon	An enigmatic gymnosperm with narrow pinnate leaves, "clasping" leaf-like sporophylls, and winged seeds. Some leaves are affected by galls, similar to those formed by eriophyid mites in modern plants.	
Dinophyton	D. spinosus	Arizona; New Mexico	Blue Mesa (= "Lower Petrified Forest"); Monitor Butte; Bluewater Creek ("Ciniza Lake beds", formerly Monitor Butte)	Common	An unusual gymnosperm combining needle-covered shoots with seed-bearing structures having the form of "pinwheel"-like clusters of tubular needles. Possibly related to Gnetales.	
Elatocladus	E. puercoensis	Arizona	Blue Mesa	Uncommon	Leaf-bearing conifer shoots	
Eoginkgoites	E. sp., E. davidsonii	Arizona; Utah	Shinarump	Common within its small stratigraphic range	A bennettitalean with palm-shaped fronds similar to some ginkgo species.	
Ginkgoites	G. sp.	Arizona	Blue Mesa	Rare	A ginkgophyte	
Lindleycladus	L. arizonicus	Arizona	Blue Mesa	Uncommon	Conifer shoots bearing Podozamites leaves. Formerly known as Podozamites arizonicus.	
Lyssoxylon	L. grigsbyi	Arizona; New Mexico	"Petrified Forest" sensu lato; Bluewater Creek (formerly Monitor Butte)	Rare	Cycad trunks	
Marcouia	M. neuropteroides	Arizona; New Mexico	Blue Mesa (= "Lower Petrified Forest"); Bluewater Creek (formerly Monitor Butte); Monitor Butte	Uncommon	Fern-like gymnosperm leaves of uncertain affinities. Some leaves are affected by feeding traces, including crescent-shaped marginal incisions and oval-shaped holes. These were probably produced by beetles or orthopterans (grasshoppers and kin).	
Masculostrobus	M. clathratus	Arizona	Monitor Butte	Locally common	A pollen-bearing cone associated with lattice-shaped Equisetosporites chinleana pollen.	
Nilssoniopteris	N. ciniza	Arizona; New Mexico; Utah	"Petrified Forest" sensu lato; Bluewater Creek ("Ciniza Lake beds", formerly Monitor Butte); Shinarump	Uncommon	Large smooth-edged bennettitalean leaves, some of which were originally identified as Macrotaeniopteris magnifola.	
Otozamites	O. macombii	New Mexico	Agua Zarca Sandstone	Uncommon	Bennettitalean leaves	
Pagiophyllum	P. sp., P. duttonia, P. navajoensis, P. readiana, P. zuniana, P. simpsonii	Arizona; Colorado; New Mexico	"Middle Dolores"; "Petrified Forest" sensu lato; Sonsela; Bluewater Creek ("Ciniza Lake beds", formerly Monitor Butte); Agua Zarca Sandstone	Locally very common	Conifer leaves	
Palissya	P. sp., P. diffusa, P. sphenolepis	New Mexico; Utah	Monitor Butte; Agua Zarca Sandstone; Shinarump	Uncommon	Conifer leaves and shoots	
Pelourdea	P. poleoensis	Utah; Colorado; New Mexico	"Siltstone"; "Middle Dolores"; Poleo; Bluewater Creek ("Ciniza Lake beds", formerly Monitor Butte); Shinarump	Common	A shrubby conifer with strap-like leaves arranged around a single narrow stem.	
Podozamites	P. sp., P. emmonsi, P. lanceolatus	Arizona; Utah	Blue Mesa (= "Lower Petrified Forest"); Shinarump; Temple Mountain	Uncommon	Conifer leafs and shoots	
Pramelreuthia	P. dubielli, P. yazzi	Arizona; New Mexico; Utah	Blue Mesa; Monitor Butte	Rare	Gymnosperm microsporophylls (pollen-bearing organs)	
Pterophyllum	P. sp., P. braunianum	Arizona; Utah	Shinarump	Uncommon	Bennettitalean leaves	
Samaropsis	S. sp., S. puerca	Arizona	Blue Mesa (= "Lower Petrified Forest")	Uncommon	Seeds of uncertain affinities	
Sanmiguelia	S. lewisii	Arizona; Utah; Colorado	Rock Point; Owl Rock; "Middle Dolores"; Petrified Forest; Sonsela; Blue Mesa	Common	An unusual palm-like shrub, controversially suggested to be a relative or predecessor of angiosperms (flowering plants).	
Schilderia	S. adamanica	Arizona	Petrified Forest	Rare	Petrified stems of a conifer or gnetalean	
Williamsonia	W. nizhonii	New Mexico	Bluewater Creek ( = "lower red member", formerly Monitor Butte)	Rare	A bennettitalean "flower" (female cone)	
Woodworthia	W. arizonica	Arizona	Petrified Forest	Uncommon	Stems and petrified wood of a conifer related to A. arizonicum.	
Zamites	Z. sp., Z. occidentalis, Z. powellii	Arizona; Utah; New Mexico	Church Rock?; Owl Rock?; Blue Mesa (= "Lower Petrified Forest"); Sonsela; Bluewater Creek ("Ciniza Lake beds", formerly Monitor Butte); Monitor Butte; Agua Zarca; Shinarump	Very common	Bennettitalean leaves. Some leaves exhibit feeding traces, including sharp diagonal marginal traces and slot-like non-marginal traces. These traces were probably left by beetles. Zamites powellii was formerly known as Otozamites powellii.	

=== Ferns ===
Ferns of the Chinle Formation
Genus	Species	State	Stratigraphic position	Abundance	Notes	Images
Apachea	A. arizonica	Arizona	"Petrified Forest"	Rare	Dipteridacean fern leaves, possibly damaged specimens of Clathropteris walkeri.	
Cladophlebis	C. daughertyi, C. subfalcata, C. yazzia, C. sp.	Arizona; New Mexico; Utah	Blue Mesa (= "Lower Petrified Forest"); Bluewater Creek (= "lower red member", formerly Monitor Butte); Monitor Butte; Shinarump	Very common	Large sterile fern leaves of uncertain affinities	
Clathropteris	C. walkeri	Arizona; New Mexico	Blue Mesa (= "Lower Petrified Forest"); Bluewater Creek (= "lower red member", formerly Monitor Butte)	Common	Dipteridacean fern leaves	
Cynepteris	C. sp., C. lasiophora	Utah; Arizona; New Mexico	Church Rock?; Owl Rock?; Blue Mesa (= "Lower Petrified Forest"); Bluewater Creek (= "lower red member", formerly Monitor Butte); Monitor Butte	Common	Bipinnate fern leaves previously identified as Lonchopteris. Some leaves are affected by crescent-shaped marginal feeding traces, probably from beetles or orthopterans (grasshoppers and kin).	
Itopsidema	I. vancleavi	Arizona	Sonsela	Uncommon	Stems of large osmundacean tree ferns. Some stems show evidence of being bored by oribatid mites.	
Phlebopteris	P. smithii, P. utensis	Arizona; New Mexico; Utah	Blue Mesa (= "Lower Petrified Forest"); Bluewater Creek ( = "lower red member" / "Ciniza Lake beds", formerly Monitor Butte); Shinarump	Common	Matoniacean fern leaves with a palmate structure	
Sphenopteris	S. arizonica	Arizona	Blue Mesa (= "Lower Petrified Forest")	Uncommon	Sterile fern leaves of uncertain affinities. Some show evidence for marginal damage by insect feeding traces.	
Todites	T. fragilis	Arizona; New Mexico	Blue Mesa (= "Lower Petrified Forest"); Bluewater Creek (="lower red member", formerly Monitor Butte)	Uncommon	Osmundacean fern leaves	
Wingatea	W. plumosa	Arizona; New Mexico	Blue Mesa (= "Lower Petrified Forest"); Bluewater Creek (="lower red member", formerly Monitor Butte)	Rare	Gleicheniacean fern leaves previously named as a species of Coniopteris.	

=== Other plants ===
Other plants of the Chinle Formation
Genus	Species	State	Stratigraphic position	Abundance	Notes	Images
Chinlea	C. sp., C. campii	Arizona	"Petrified Forest" sensu lato	Uncommon	Small lycopod stems similar to shrubby forms such as Pleuromeia.	
Equisetites	E. sp., E. bradyi	Arizona; Utah; New Mexico	Blue Mesa (= "Lower Petrified Forest"); Bluewater Creek ("Ciniza Lake beds", formerly Monitor Butte); Shinarump	Common	A horsetail indistinguishable from modern Equisetum.	
Equisetocalis	E. muirii	Arizona	Blue Mesa	Concentrated in a narrow stratigraphic range (the Newspaper Rock sandstone bed)	Small three-dimensional horsetail stems preserved in pyrite nodules.	
Isoetites	I. circularis	Arizona	"Petrified Forest" sensu lato	Rare	Quillwort shoots	
Lycostrobus	L. chinleana	Arizona	Blue Mesa (= "Lower Petrified Forest")	Rare	Horsetail cones sometimes placed in the genus Equicalastrobus	
Neocalamites	N. sp., N. virginiensis	Arizona; Utah; Colorado; New Mexico	"Siltstone"; Church Rock?; Owl Rock?; "Petrified Forest" sensu lato; Bluewater Creek ( = "lower red member" / "Ciniza Lake beds", formerly Monitor Butte)	Common	Stems and leaves of a giant sphenophyte (horsetail)	
Schizoneura	S. harrisii	New Mexico	Bluewater Creek (formerly Monitor Butte)	Uncommon	Stems and leaves of a large sphenophyte (horsetail) more typical of Southern Hemisphere plant assemblages.	
Selaginella	S. anasazia	Arizona	Monitor Butte	Uncommon	A low-growing lycopsid similar to modern broad-leaved species of Selaginella, such as S. kraussiana	

== Bibliography ==
- Irmis, R. B. 2005. The vertebrate fauna of the Upper Triassic Chinle Formation in northern Arizona. p. 63-88. in S.J. Nesbitt, W.G. Parker, and R.B. Irmis (eds.) 2005. Guidebook to the Triassic formations of the Colorado Plateau in northern Arizona: Geology, Paleontology, and History. Mesa Southwest Museum Bulletin 9.
- Mueller, B. D. and Parker, W. G. 2006. A new species of Trilophosaurus (Diapsida: Archosauromorpha) from the Sonsela Member (Chinle Formation) of Petrified Forest National Park, Arizona. In W. G. Parker, S. R. Ash & R. B. Irmis (eds.), A Century of Research at Petrified Forest National Park, 1906-2006: Geology and Paleontology. Museum of Northern Arizona Bulletin 62:119-125
- Mueller, B.D. (2007). "Koskinonodon Branson and Mehl, 1929, a replacement name for the preoccupied temnospondyl Buettneria Case, 1922". Journal of Vertebrate Paleontology. 27 (1): 225. doi:10.1671/0272-4634(2007)27[225:KBAMAR]2.0.CO;2. S2CID 85763026.
- Weishampel, David B.; Dodson, Peter; and Osmólska, Halszka (eds.): The Dinosauria, 2nd, Berkeley: University of California Press. 861 pp. ISBN 0-520-24209-2.
