= Akidostropheus =

Akidostropheus Temporal range: Late Triassic (Norian), ~223–218 Ma
- Reconstructed skeleton

Scientific classification
- Kingdom: Animalia
- Phylum: Chordata
- Class: Reptilia
- Clade: Archosauromorpha
- Clade: †Tanysauria
- Family: †Tanystropheidae
- Genus: †Akidostropheus; Schubul, Marsh & Kligman, 2025
- Species: †A. oligos

Binomial name
- †Akidostropheus oligos Schubul, Marsh & Kligman, 2025

Genus of tanystropheid reptile

Akidostropheus (meaning "spike joint") is an extinct genus of tanystropheid archosauromorph reptile known from the Late Triassic of what is now Arizona, United States. The genus contains a single species, Akidostropheus oligos, discovered in the early 21st century and named in 2025. It is known from several isolated vertebrae found in the Chinle Formation, which dates to the Norian age.

Akidostropheus is a small-bodied animal. Its vertebrae are very unique, as the neural spines bear elongated spikes. These would have formed a row of pointed spines running along the animal's neck, back, and tail, possibly serving a defensive function to deter predators. Akidostropheus may be closely related to Tanytrachelos.

== Discovery and naming ==
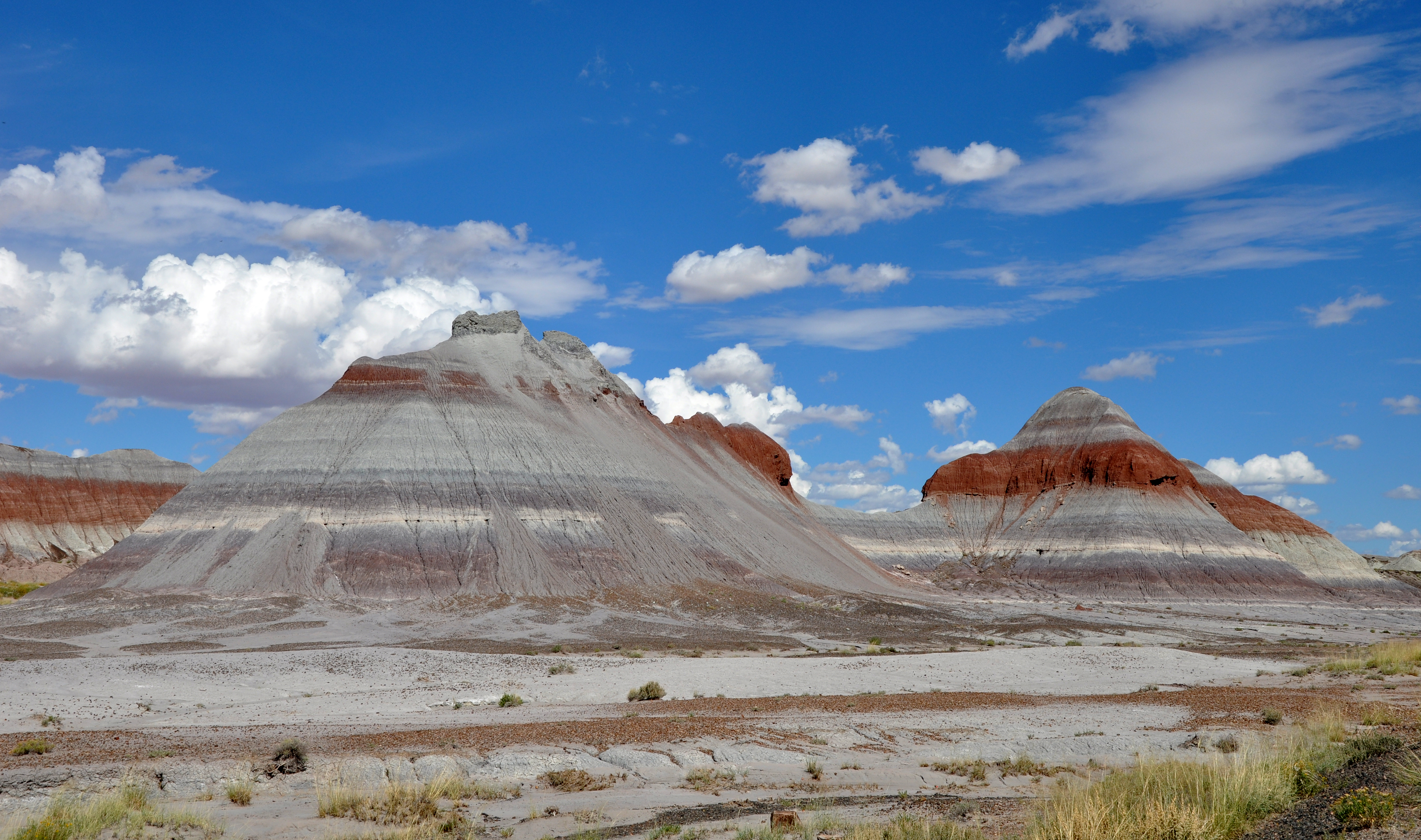
Outcrops of the Chinle Formation (Blue Mesa Member) in Petrified Forest National Park

Beginning in 2010, expeditions were conducted within Petrified Forest National Park (PEFO) in Arizona, United States, with the purpose of collecting and researching fossils exposed on the parkland. In 2017, a new fossiliferous locality representing a layer of the upper Blue Mesa Member of the Chinle Formation, designated as PFV 456 and referred to as "Thunderstorm Ridge", was discovered by Ben Kligman and Charles Beightol IV. Subsequent excavations were carried out at this locality in 2018, 2019, and 2021. Hundreds of bones belonging to members of the archosauromorph family Tanystropheidae were collected in this locality. Based on the morphology of the cervical (neck) vertebrae, the presence of at least three distinct tanystropheid taxa was recognized.

In 2025, Alaska N. Schubul, Adam D. Marsh, and Ben T. Kligman described Akidostropheus oligos as a new genus and species of tanystropheid reptile based on several vertebrae from the 'Thunderstorm Ridge' locality. Similar vertebrae from coeval localities—PFV 396 ('Coprolite Layer' locality), also in PEFO, and MNA 207/UCMP A269 (Placerias/Downs quarries) near St. Johns in Arizona—were also referred to Akidostropheus. The holotype specimen, PEFO 49132, is a single cervical vertebra. Three additional vertebrae, two from the trunk (PEFO 49131, 55418) and one from the tail (PEFO 48152) were assigned to Akidostropheus as paratypes. 40 additional elements, comprising complete vertebrae, neural arches, and isolated neural spikes, were also referred to the species.

The generic name, Akidostropheus, is derived from the Greek words ἀκίς/ἀκίδoς (akis/akidos), meaning "spike" or "point", and stropheus, meaning "joint" or "hinge". This refers to the spiked morphology of the vertebral neural spines unique to this animal. The specific name, oligos, is derived from the Ancient Greek word ὀλίγος, meaning "little", referencing the very small size of the holotype specimen.

== Description ==
Akidostropheus is known only from isolated elements from the vertebral column. These bones are all notably small; the holotype neck vertebra is only 5.5 millimetres (0.22 in) long. Similarly, one of the paratype dorsal (trunk) vertebrae (PEFO 49131) is 5.6 mm (0.22 in) long, and the paratype caudal vertebra is 5.7 mm (0.22 in) long. The vertebrae are procoelous, meaning that the centra are concave anteriorly (toward the front) and convex posteriorly (toward the back).

The most notable feature of Akidostropheus is the presence of elongated spikes fused to the neural spines (process directed upward) of all of the vertebrae. This anatomical character is an autapomorphy (unique derived character) of Akidostropheus, as it is not seen in any other archosauromorph. The nature of these spikes is somewhat unclear; they could be an extension of the bone of the neural arch, or a separate element like an osteoderm that is fully fused to the neural spine. The unusual ankylosaurian dinosaur Spicomellus demonstrates comparable spikes, albeit projecting from the ribs. These spikes are osteoderms fused to the underlying bone, identified as such based on different bone growth patterns between the spike and the rib observable via histological sectioning and CT imaging. CT imaging of the Akidostropheus holotype did not reveal areas where the ossification degree varies, supporting the identification of the spike as an extension of the neural arch. However, the researchers describing the taxon noted that histological sampling of the specimen could further clarify this. Furthermore, osteoderms have not been identified in any other tanysaurian or even early-diverging archosauromorph, only appearing in the later-diverging clade Archosauriformes (e.g., Vancleavea, Litorosuchus, Doswelliidae). If the vertebral spikes in Akidostropheus are co-ossified osteoderms, this would indicate these structures evolved in convergence with the distantly-related archosauriforms.

While the presence of a tall neural spike is unusual for an archosauromorph, similar structures have evolved convergently in several other lineages; the reptile Eusaurosphargis has pointed osteoderms adjacent to each vertebra. These are not fused to the neural arch in immature individuals. Some drepanosauromorphs have elongated neural spines on the post-cervical vertebrae, but these feature low and rounded tips, rather than pointed. A similar morphology to Akidostropheus is also seen in an enigmatic amniote of uncertain relationships from the Middle Jurassic of Russia, though several anatomical distinctions suggest the similarities are convergent and the animals are not related.

The spikes in Akidostropheus likely served a defensive function against predation. Small longitudinal striations along the spikes suggest each spike may have been covered in a keratinous sheath, further extending their length. The spikes are more conical and sharp on the neck, and become more flattened and bladelike toward the back of the animal. The extremely elongate necks of tanystropheids were vulnerable regions of the body, and there is evidence that predators targeted this region for decapitation in Tanystropheus. As such, predation may have driven the evolution of the neural spikes in Akidostropheus via an adaptive or exaptive mechanism. The possibility that the spikes served a non-defensive function is still open.

== Classification ==
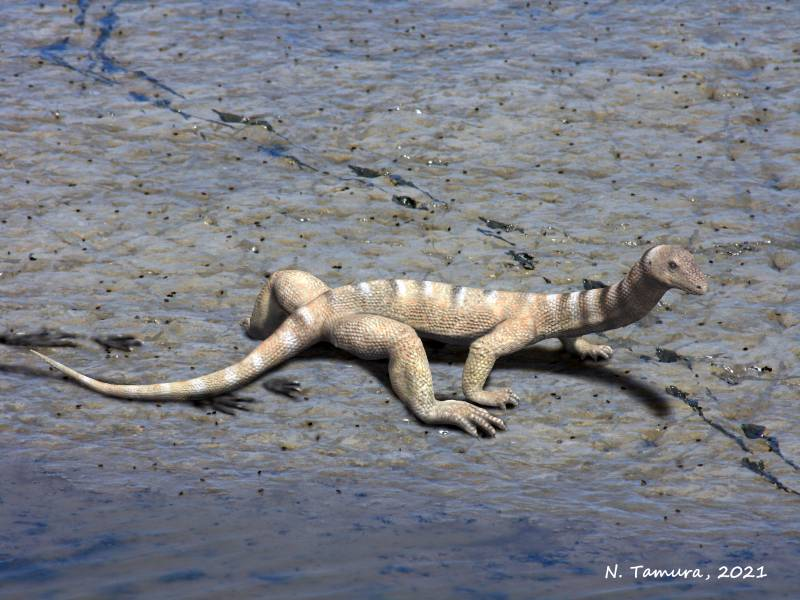
Speculative life restoration of the related Tanytrachelos

Schubul, Marsh & Kligman did not include Akidostropheus in a phylogenetic analysis in their 2025 description. However, they referenced various anatomical characters that elucidate its phylogenetic affinities and relationships to other taxa. Akidostropheus shares procoelous vertebrae and cervical vertebral centra that are dorsoventrally compressed with the European Langobardisaurus (known from Italy and Austria), Tanytrachelos (best known from Virginia, USA), and an unnamed taxon from the Hayden Quarry (a Chinle Formation site in New Mexico, USA). It further shares procoelous presacral vertebrae with Tanytrachelos and AMNH FARB 7206 (an unnamed Tanytrachelos-like form from the Lockatong or Stockton Formation of New Jersey).

== Paleoenvironment ==
Akidostropheus is known from the upper Blue Mesa Member of the Chinle Formation, which dates to the early to middle Norian stage of the late Triassic period. More specifically, most of the fossil material was found in the PFV 456 ('Thunderstorm Ridge') assemblage, a bone bed of many vertebrate fossils. Radioisotopic dating using U-Pb zircon crystals indicates an absolute age between 223.036 ± 0.059 Ma and 218.08 ± 0.037 Ma for this layer. The geology of this locality indicates it was deposited by a meandering river system in a waterlogged freshwater ecosystem far from the ocean.

Many organisms have been identified from the PFV 456 bone bed. Described vertebrate taxa include the early caecilian (a wormlike amphibian) Funcusvermis, the eucynodont (mammal 'precursor') Kataigidodon, the drepanosaurid Skybalonyx, the aetosaur Kryphioparma, and many unnamed taxa including a dinosauromorph known from a tibia.

The PFV 396 site, from which Akidostropheus is also known, is stratigraphically correlated to PFV 456. Notable vertebrate fossils from this locality include the ray-finned fish Saurichthys, early frogs, the reptiles Colognathus, Palacrodon, and Uatchitodon.
