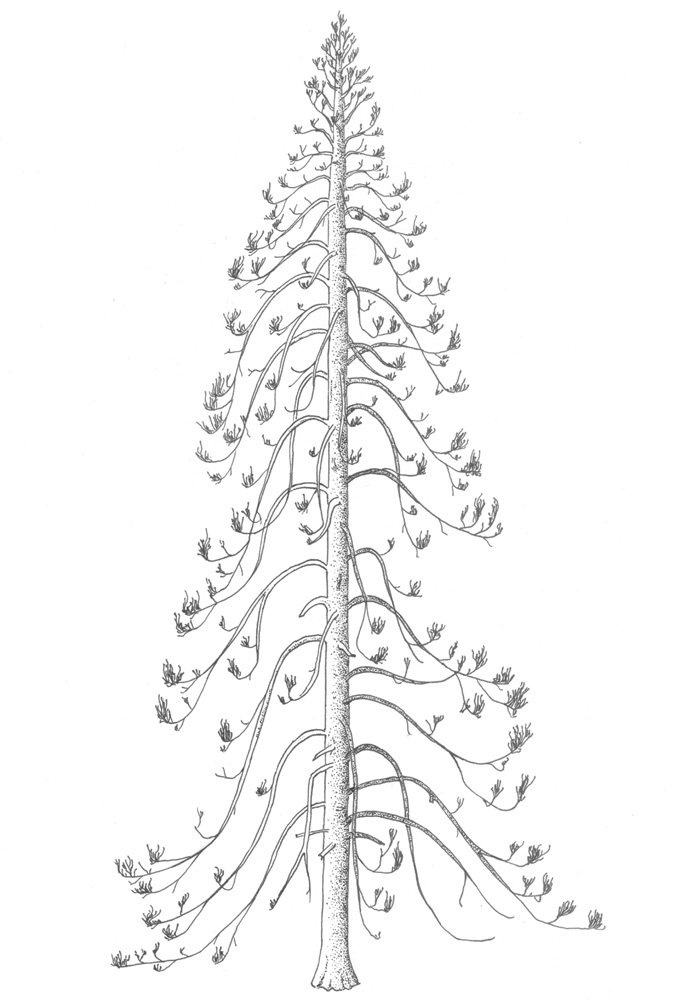
- Reconstructed habit of A. arizonicum

Scientific classification
- Kingdom: Plantae
- Clade: Tracheophytes
- Clade: Gymnosperms
- Division: Pinophyta
- Class: Pinopsida
- Order: Araucariales
- Family: Araucariaceae
- Genus: †Araucarioxylon
- Species: †A. arizonicum

Binomial name
- †Araucarioxylon arizonicum Knowlt.

= Araucarioxylon arizonicum =

Araucarioxylon arizonicum Temporal range: Early Permian-Late Triassic 295–200 Ma

Extinct species of conifer

Araucarioxylon arizonicum (alternatively Agathoxylon) is an extinct species of conifer that is the state fossil of Arizona. The species is known from massive tree trunks that weather out of the Chinle Formation in desert badlands of northern Arizona and adjacent New Mexico, most notably in the 378.51 square kilometres (93,530 acres) Petrified Forest National Park. There, these trunks are locally so abundant that they have been used as building materials.

== Description ==
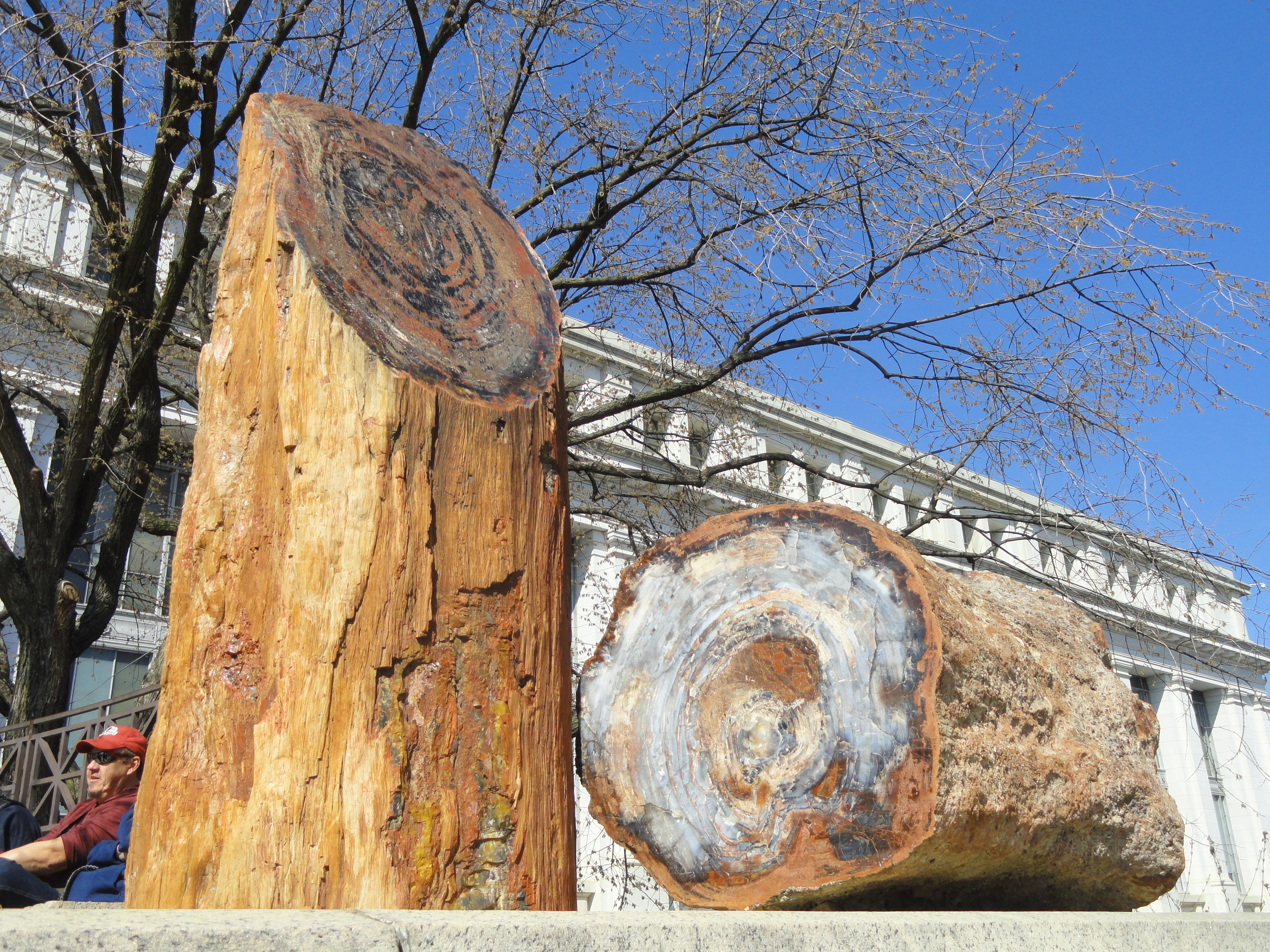
Petrified Araucarioxylon arizonicum

The petrified wood of this tree is frequently referred to as "Rainbow wood" because of the large variety of colors some specimens exhibit. The red and yellow are produced by large particulate forms of iron oxide, the yellow being limonite and the red being hematite. The purple hue comes from extremely fine spherules of hematite distributed throughout the quartz matrix, and not from manganese, as has sometimes been suggested.

The trunks were large and slender, tapering slightly towards their apex. The largest known trunk in Petrified Forest was 'Old Faithful', from the Rainbow Forest sandstone beds of the Sonsela Member. This trunk had a diameter of 2.9 meters (9.5 feet) at its base, and a maximum estimated height of 59 meters (194 feet) based on modern conifer proportions. Branches are broken off in most fossils, but their bases leave scars indicating that the branches were slender and bent upwards at around 30-40 degrees above the horizontal. The branches are regularly and widely spaced around nearly the entire trunk. Some fragments from the upper part of the trunk have thin branches arranged in small clusters.

Preserved bark is rare, but known bark fossils show that it is thin and "rippled", with low ridges and longitudinal furrows similar to some modern pines. The roots, when preserved, are significantly different from modern conifers: There is a massive central taproot, up to 5 meters (16.4 feet) long, ringed by four to six thick lateral roots. Modern conifers, on the other hand, typically bear a circular cluster of relatively small, narrow roots. No known conifer foliage is directly associated with the trunks, but common conifer leaves such as Pagiophyllum, Brachyphyllum, and Podozamites are also known from the Chinle Formation. In life, Araucarioxylon arizonicum may have looked similar to a medium-sized Sequoiadendron giganteum (giant sequoia).

== Paleoecology ==
In the Triassic period (around 250 to 200 million years ago), Arizona was a flat tropical expanse in the southwest corner of the supercontinent Pangaea. There, a forest grew in which A. arizonicum towered as high as 60 metres (200 ft) and measured more than 60 centimetres (2.0 ft) in diameter. Fossils frequently show boreholes of insect larvae, possibly beetles similar to members of the modern family Ptinidae.

== Taxonomy ==
Araucarioxylon arizonicum has alternatively been called Agathoxylon arizonicum due to Araucarioxylon being a junior synonym of Agathoxylon. They were first described in 1889 by the American paleobotanist Frank Hall Knowlton.

The validity of the name Araucarioxylon arizonicum has been questioned. A. arizonicum may actually be composed of several different genera and species. A 2007 study on the syntypes used by Knowlton in describing the species has revealed that they belonged to three species. They were tentatively reclassified as Pullisilvaxylon arizonicum, Pullisilvaxylon daughertii, and Chinleoxylon knowltonii. The genus Araucarioxylon may thus be superfluous and illegitimate; and the petrified logs of Petrified Forest National Park may be composed of a greater diversity than initially believed.

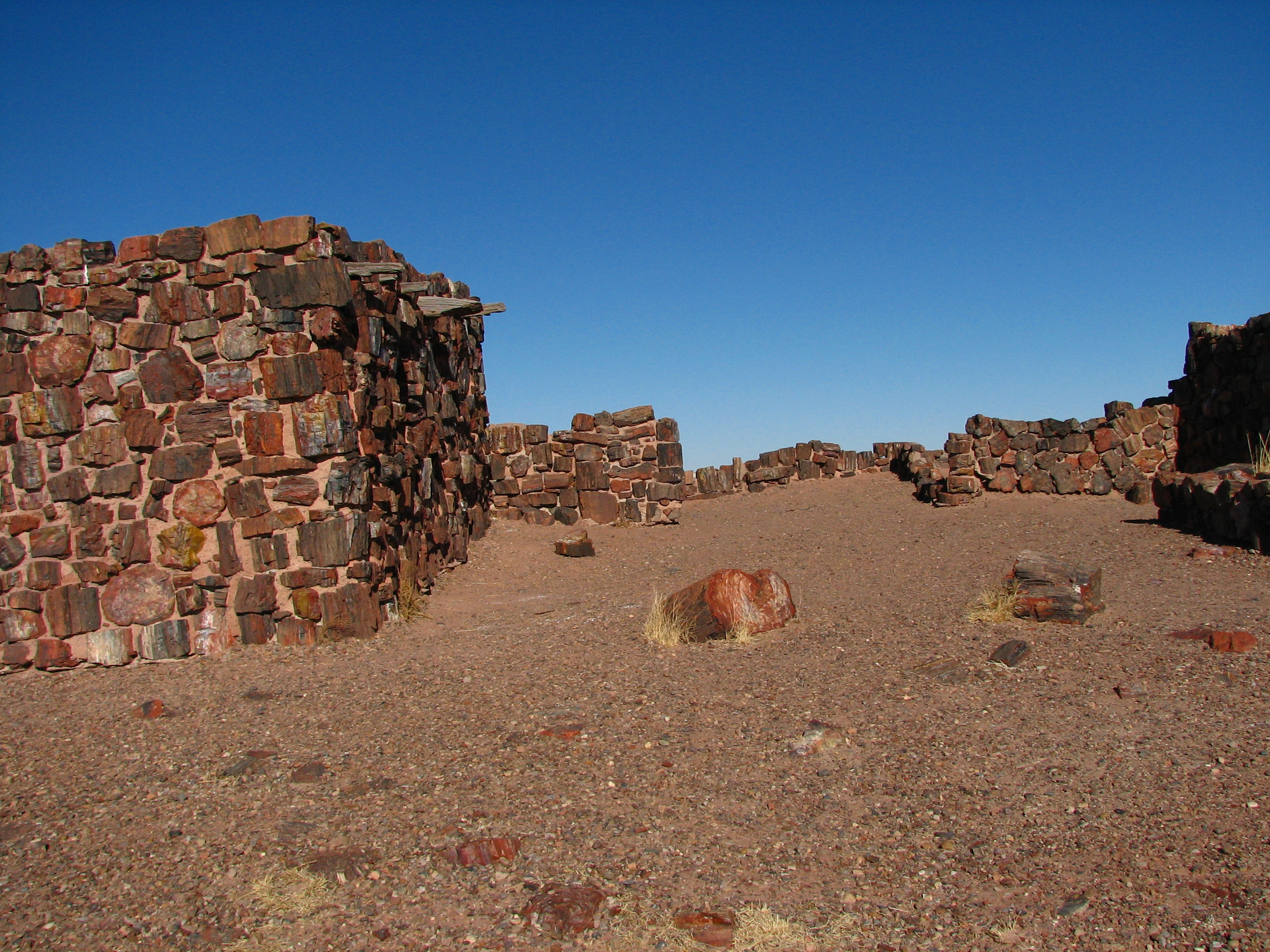
Agate House Pueblo, constructed with petrified wood

== See also ==
- Paleobotany
- Araucaria
- Araucaria mirabilis
- Araucarites sanctaecrucis
- Nothofagus
- Paleobiota of the Chinle Formation
