= Eotephradactylus =

Eotephradactylus Temporal range: Late Triassic (late Norian), ~209.2 Ma
- Reconstruction illustrating known material

Scientific classification
- Kingdom: Animalia
- Phylum: Chordata
- Class: Reptilia
- Clade: Ornithodira
- Clade: †Pterosauromorpha
- Order: †Pterosauria
- Genus: †Eotephradactylus; Kligman et al., 2025
- Species: †E. mcintireae

Binomial name
- †Eotephradactylus mcintireae Kligman et al., 2025

Genus of early pterosaurs

Eotephradactylus (meaning "ash-winged dawn goddess") is an extinct genus of pterosaurs known from the Late Triassic of what is now Arizona, United States. The genus contains a single species, Eotephradactylus mcintireae, discovered in 2011 and named in 2025. It is known from part of the lower jaw, isolated teeth, and possibly a wing bone found in the Chinle Formation, which dates to the Norian age. These bones were found in a bone bed in addition to many other species, including various fish, mammal precursors, turtles, and other reptiles.

Eotephradactylus is an early-diverging pterosaur, possibly closely related to the European Seazzadactylus. Like some other early pterosaurs, it is characterized by its heterodont dentition. However, unique to Eotephradactylus, it has extensive wear on all of its teeth, showing that it probably ate hard-shelled invertebrates or fish with mineralized scales. Eotephradactylus is the oldest known pterosaur named from North America.

== Discovery and naming ==
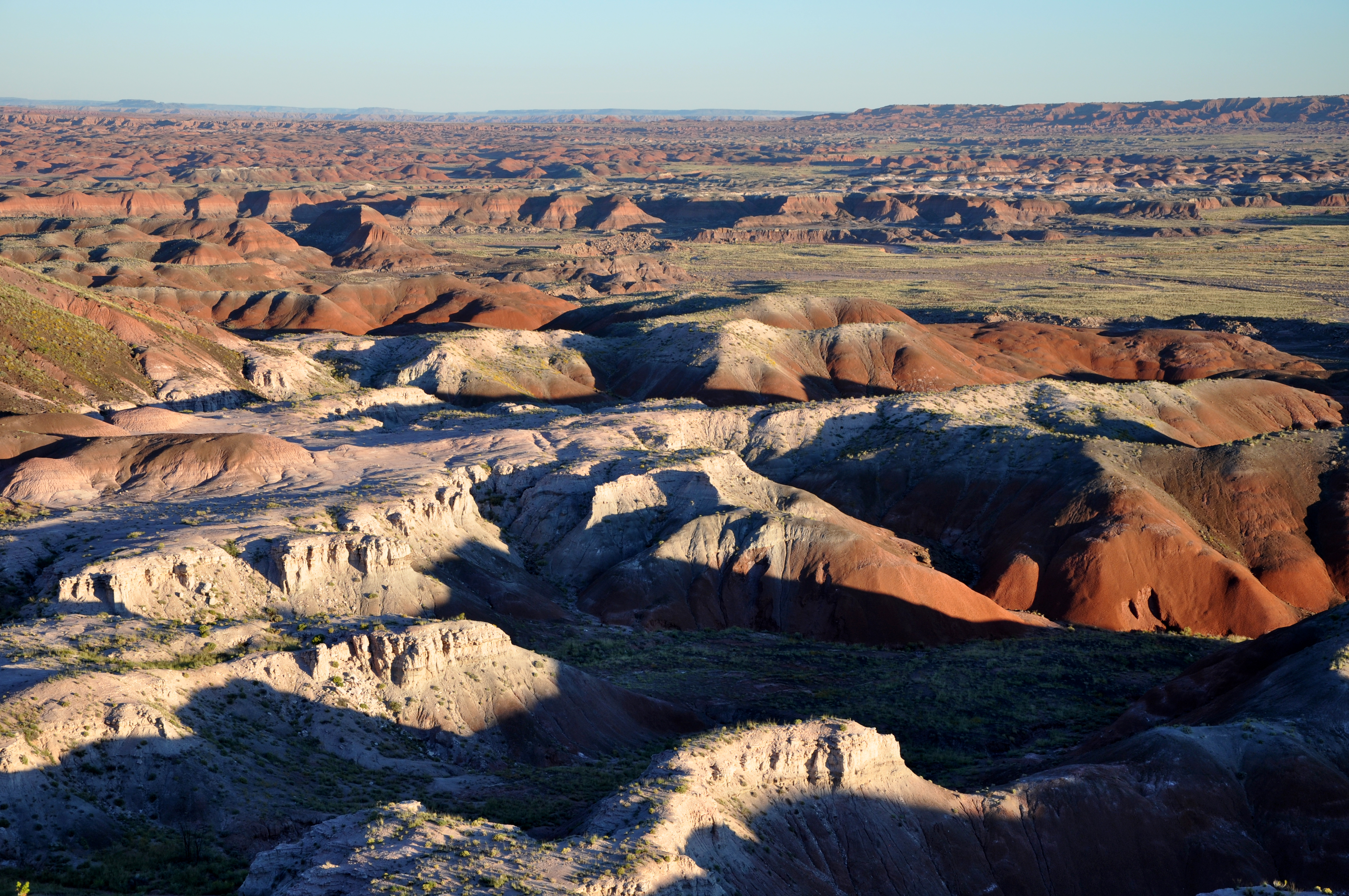
Chinle Formation outcrops in Petrified Forest National Park, Arizona

In the summer of 2011, an expedition was conducted by the Smithsonian National Museum of Natural History and Columbia College Chicago in outcrops of the Owl Rock Member of the Chinle Formation. These rock layers are located within Petrified Forest National Park (PEFO) in northeastern Arizona, United States. This work, continued in 2012, 2015, and 2023, revealed a bone bed, identified as PFV 393, preserving a high-diversity assemblage of fossil vertebrates. This locality and its specimens were briefly noted in a Society of Vertebrate Paleontology conference abstract in 2019. Among the fossils identified from this locality were a partial left mandible (lower jaw), isolated teeth, and a phalanx (digit bone) belonging to a pterosaur.

In 2025, Kligman and colleagues described Eotephradactylus mcintireae as a new genus and species of pterosaurs based on these fossil remains. They established PEFO 53384, part of the left dentary bone preserving several teeth, as the holotype specimen. Two teeth, the multicusped PEFO 53536 and caniniform PEFO 54092, were not found in association with the holotype. However, they share unique features with the holotype teeth, allowing for their referral to Eotephradactylus. An isolated wing phalanx (finger bone), PEFO 52926, was also referred to this taxon on the assumption that Eotephradactylus is the only pterosaur present in the PFV 393 locality.

The generic name, Eotephradactylus, combines the Greek words Ἠώς (Eos), referring to the mythic goddess of the dawn and the animal's position at the beginning of pterosaur evolution, τέφρα (tephra; "ash"), referring to the nearby volcanic ash layers, and δάκτυλος (daktylos; "digit"), in reference to the elongated wing-forming fourth finger in pterosaurs. The intended translation of this name is "ash-winged dawn goddess". The specific name, mcintireae, honors Suzanne McIntire, who discovered the fossil material in 2013 while preparing a block from the PFV 393 quarry.

Eotephradactylus is notably one of the only Triassic pterosaurs found outside of Europe, and is the oldest pterosaur to be named from North America.

== Description ==
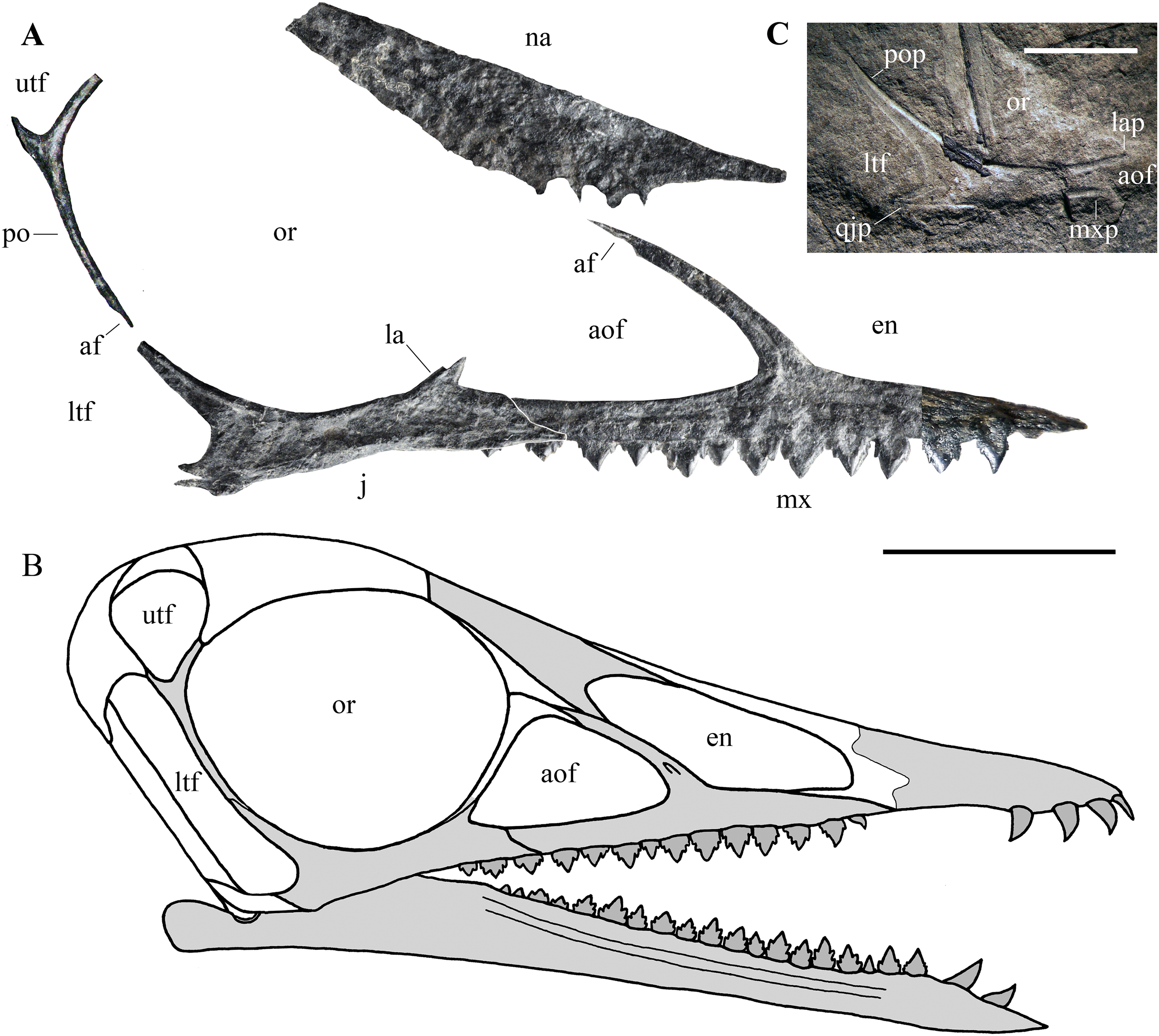
Reconstructed skull of the related Seazzadactylus, illustrating cusped teeth similar to those of Eotephradactylus

As preserved, the holotype dentary of Eotephradactylus is 41 millimetres (1.6 in) long, although the anterior (toward the front) end is missing due to damage to the specimen. An impression in the matrix surrounding the dentary indicates the bone was at least 43.5 mm (1.71 in) long. In comparison, the dentary of Eudimorphodon is around 55 mm (2.2 in) long and its wingspan and body mass have been estimated at 1 m (3.3 ft) and 325 g (0.717 lb), respectively. The body size of Eotephradactylus has been likened to that of a small seagull.

The Eotephradactylus dentary has at least 24 alveoli (tooth sockets), 12 of which preserve erupted teeth. The dentary is shortest in the middle, expanding toward the front of the snout. Eotephradactylus is characterized by having heterodont dentition in its dentary, with a combination of thin, pointed caniniform teeth closer to the front of the snout and broader, cusped teeth toward the back of the jaws. In general, the teeth increase in labiolingual compression (becoming flatter) and mesiodistal length (broader) from front to back. The first two teeth preserved in the holotype are subconical in shape, though their incompleteness makes it impossible to identify the presence or absence of cusps (raised points on the tooth crown). As preserved, the third tooth bears three cusps and the fourth has one, although these are also incomplete. The fifth and sixth preserved teeth are smaller than those on either side and overlap from front to back. Both are likely tricuspid. Tooth seven (five cusps), eight (three cusps), and nine (six cusps) are all worn on their apices, so they may have born additional cusps. The tenth and eleventh teeth are the largest in the specimen and have seven and five cusps, respectively. Fluting (small grooves) is present directly mesial (toward the front) and distal (toward the back) to the central cusp on these teeth, which is identified as an autapomorphy (unique derived trait) of Eotephradactylus. The twelfth tooth is worn but likely had cusps, as evidenced by the presence of fluting.

== Classification ==
To test the affinities and relationships of Eotephradactylus, Kligman et al. (2025) scored the taxon in two separate phylogenetic datasets, both modified from the description of the early Argentinian pterosaurs Yelaphomte and Pachagnathus by Martínez et al. (2022). The first dataset, taken from Ezcurra et al. (2020), broadly samples reptile diversity. This phylogenetic analysis confirmed that the fossils belonged to a pterosaur, and not another unrelated Triassic reptile. The analysis placed Eotephradactylus as the sister taxon to Eudimorphodon. However, Kligman et al. noted that, since this analysis only contained a limited number of pterosaur taxa and pterosaur-specific characters, the results were less likely to accurately indicate the precise affinities of the sampled taxa.

The second dataset, taken from the Andres et al. (2014) description of Kryptodrakon, is more directly focused on non-pterodactyloids, thus providing more accurate relationships within the early-diverging Pterosauria. These results recovered Eotephradactylus in a polytomy with Seazzadactylus, a clade including Eudimorphodon and Arcticodactylus, the Raeticodactylidae, and the Macronychoptera (the clade including all other later-diverging pterosaurs). The cladogram below displays these results:

- Pterosauria
  - - Austriadactylus
    - Preondactylus
  - - Peteinosaurus
    - - Eotephradactylus
      - Seazzadactylus
      - - Arcticodactylus
        - - Eudimorphodon
          - Carniadactylus
      - Raeticodactylidae
        - Caviramus
        - - Yelaphomte
          - Raeticodactylus
      - Macronychoptera
        - Dimorphodontia
        - - Herbstosaurus
          - Novialoidea

== Paleoecology ==
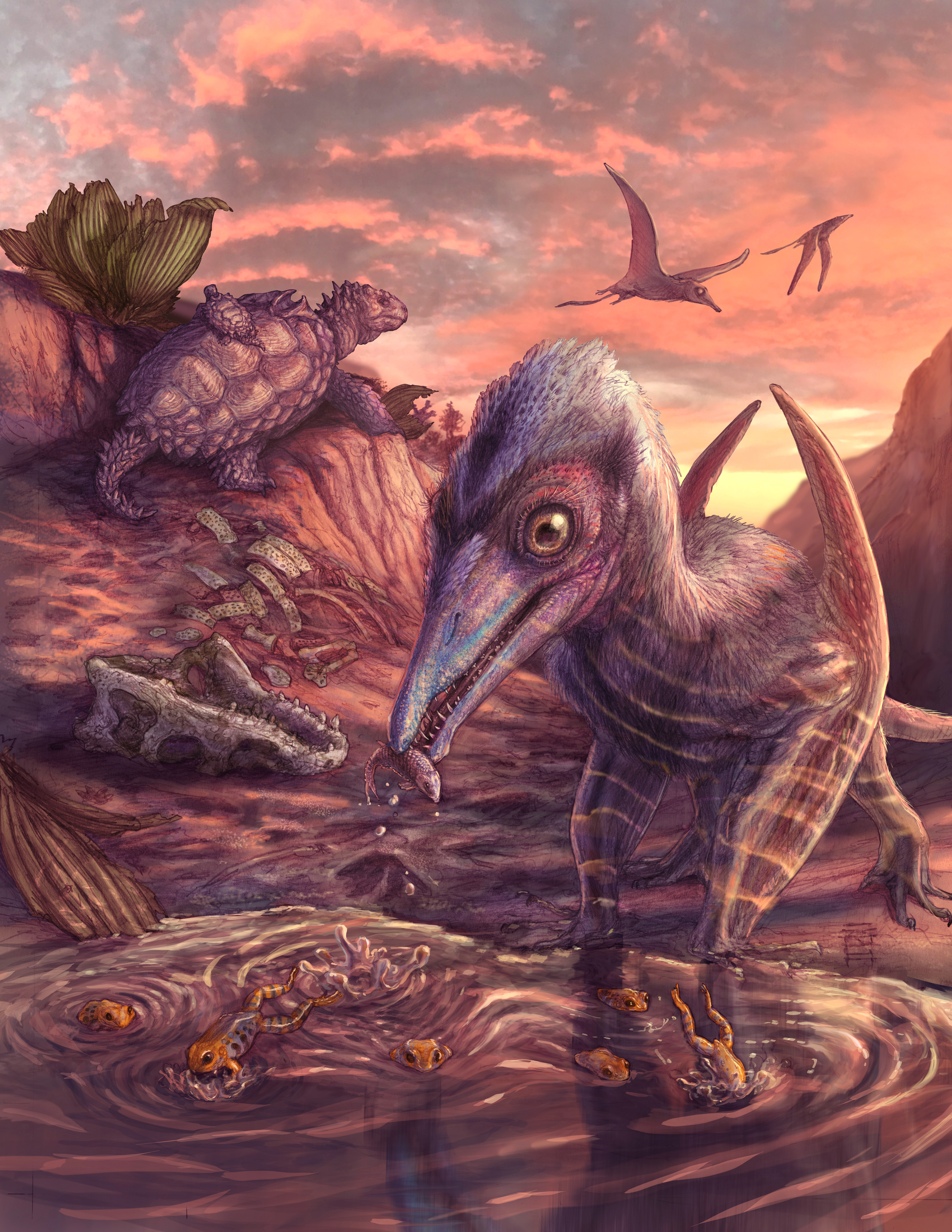
Speculative life restoration of Eotephradactylus catching a fish in the Chinle Formation environment

=== Feeding and diet ===
Most of the Eotephradactylus teeth apices demonstrate extensive wear facets in the enamel, exposing the dentin within, another proposed autapomorphy of the taxon. This may indicate extensive tooth-tooth occlusion or tooth-food contact. Specifically, it may suggest that the diet of Eotephradactylus included arthropods with hardened exoskeletons or paleoniscoid fishes that have scales mineralized with ganoine. Ganoine scales are the most common vertebrate fossil element found in the PFV 393 locality, strengthening this hypothesis.

=== Paleoenvironment ===
Eotephradactylus is known from the lower Owl Rock Member of the Chinle Formation, which dates to the late Norian stage of the late Triassic period. More specifically, the fossil material was found in the PFV 393 assemblage, a bone bed of many vertebrate fossils. Radioisotopic dating using U-Pb zircon crystals indicates an absolute age of 209.187 ± 0.083 Ma for this layer. The geology of this locality consists of a conglomeratic matrix with carbonate clasts, allochthonous rock fragments, and medium to fine sands. The fossil-bearing conglomerates are associated with channels that indicate the depositional environment was a large braided river system that eroded into an underlying floodplain deposit. The poor sorting of the conglomerates suggests there may have been occasional periods of high energy, such as rapid episodes of flash flooding at the time the rock layers were deposited.

Sixteen vertebrates have been identified from the PFV 393 bone bed, including Eotephradactylus. The archosauromorpha fauna is dominated by non-avemetatarsalians (the clade including pterosaurs and dinosaurs). This includes bones of pseudosuchians (Revueltosaurus callenderi and a rauisuchid) proterochampsians (Vancleavea campi and an unnamed doswelliid), a phytosaur, and an unnamed trilophosaurid. Other reptiles include an unnamed sphenodontian (the group including the modern tuatara) and testudinatan (turtle relative). Non-reptilian tetrapods include an unnamed carnivorous synapsid (mammal 'precursor'), a salientian amphibian (species more closely related to frogs than to salamanders), and metoposaurid temnospondyl. Various fish include a hybodont (shark relative), durophagous and piscivorous actinopterygians including palaeoniscoids, and a mawsoniid (a type of coelacanth).

== See also ==
- Caelestiventus
- Paleobiota of the Chinle Formation
- Timeline of pterosaur research
