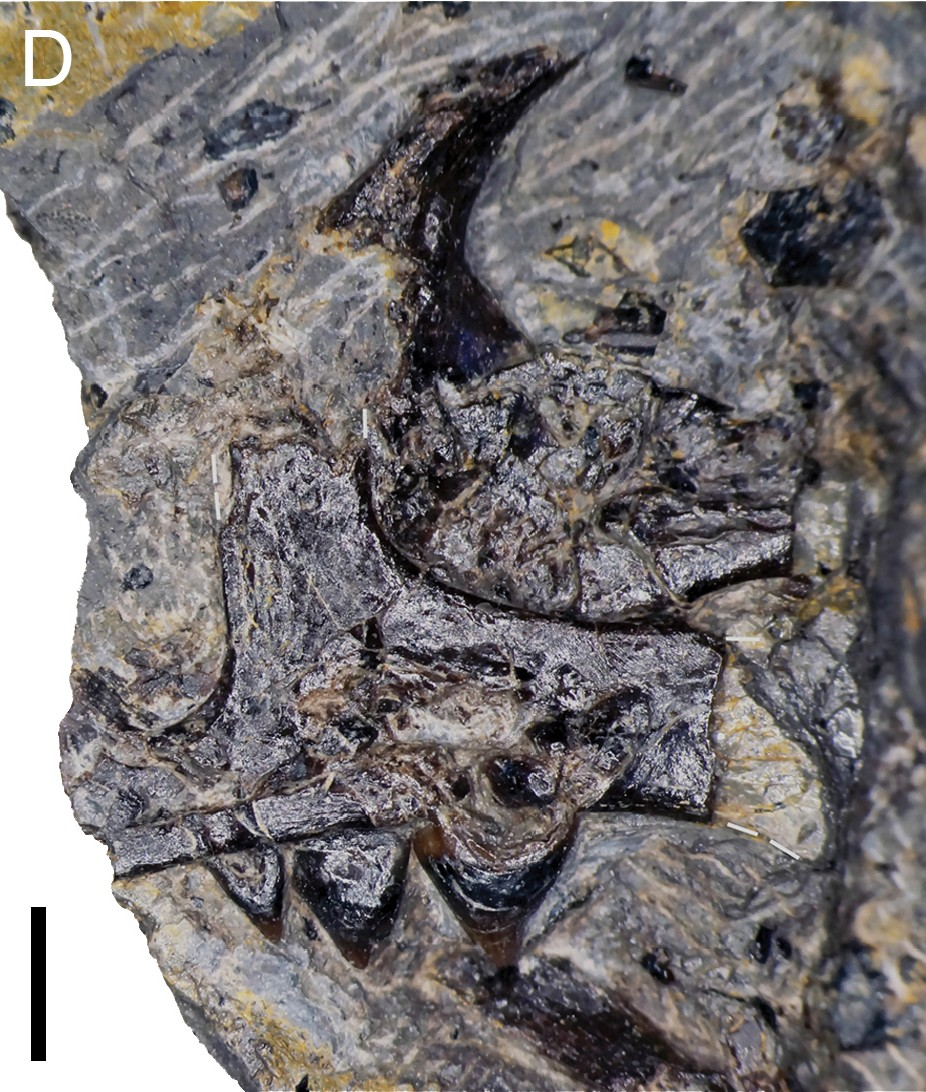
- Partial skull of Quasicolognathus

Scientific classification
- Kingdom: Animalia
- Phylum: Chordata
- Class: Reptilia
- Order: incertae sedis
- Family: †Colognathidae; Sues, Kligman & Schoch, 2022

Type genus
- †Colognathus Case, 1933

Genera
- †Colognathus; †Quasicolognathus

= Colognathidae =

Colognathids Temporal range: Middle–Late Triassic (Ladinian–Norian)

Family of extinct reptiles

Colognathidae is an extinct family of enigmatic reptiles. It contains two genera: Colognathus, known from the Late Triassic of the southwestern United States, and the older Quasicolognathus, known from the Middle Triassic of Germany. Both are known from fragmentary remains, mostly comprising tooth-bearing bones of the skull and isolated teeth. The phylogenetic affinities of these taxa have been historically complicated due to their unique anatomy and fragmentary nature; Colognathus was initially described as a unique fish, with later researchers suggesting possible affinities with procolophonids, lepidosauromorphs, and archosauromorphs. A 2022 review indicated that research on the relationships of colognathids was ongoing, but that affinities with osteichthyan fishes, procolophonids, and lepidosauromorphs were not supported.

Colognathids are characterized by having transversely narrow snouts and unique dental anatomy, exhibiting pleurodont/acrodont implantation. There are only two or three large teeth in the maxilla and dentary (upper and lower tooth-bearing bones), leaving the front of the jaw edentulous (toothless). The posteriormost (further to the back) teeth are greatly enlarged.
