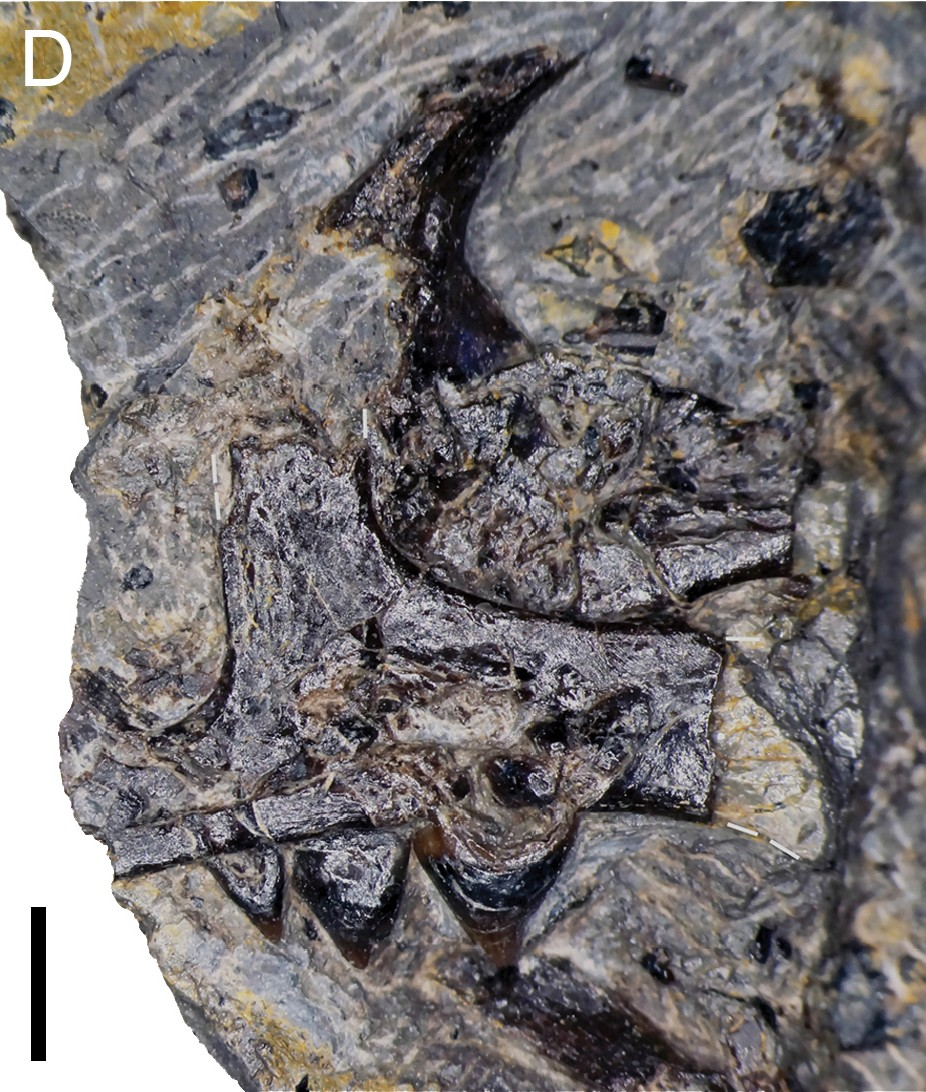
- Holotype partial skull

Scientific classification
- Kingdom: Animalia
- Phylum: Chordata
- Class: Reptilia
- Order: incertae sedis
- Family: †Colognathidae
- Genus: †Quasicolognathus; Sues, Kligman & Schoch, 2022
- Species: †Q. eothen

Binomial name
- †Quasicolognathus eothen Sues, Kligman & Schoch, 2022

= Quasicolognathus =

Quasicolognathus Temporal range: Middle Triassic, Ladinian

Genus of extinct reptiles

Quasicolognathus (lit. 'resembling Colognathus') is an extinct genus of enigmatic reptile known from the Middle Triassic Erfurt Formation of Germany. The genus contains a single species, Quasicolognathus eothen, known from a fragmentary skull and isolated mandibles. These bones exhibit striking similarities to Colognathus obscurus, a species known from the Norian of the United States. The Quasicolognathus lower jaw material was initially described in 2011 as a 'procolophonid-like tetrapod', and later assigned to Colognathus in 2013 before the eventual discovery of additional skull bones. More detailed analyses of the German fossils allowed them to be described as belonging to a distinct taxon in 2022. These two genera are placed in their own family, Colognathidae, which has uncertain relationships to other reptiles.
