= Colognathus =

Colognathus Temporal range: Late Triassic, Norian

Scientific classification
- Kingdom: Animalia
- Phylum: Chordata
- Class: Reptilia
- Family: †Colognathidae
- Genus: †Colognathus; Case, 1933

Type species
- †Xenognathus obscurus Case, 1928

Synonyms
- Xenognathus Case, 1928 (preoccupied)

Genus of extinct reptile

Colognathus is an extinct genus of enigmatic reptile from Late Triassic (Norian age) rocks of the southwestern United States. The genus contains a single species, Colognathus obscurus, described in 1928 by Ermine C. Case based on a jaw fragment. Case interpreted the specimen as belonging to a unique form of fish. Later analyses suggested possible relationships with procolophonid 'parareptiles. Alongside the German Quasicolognathus, it is currently placed in the family Colognathidae, the relationships of which are unclear.

== Distribution ==
Approximately 25 specimens have been found as of 2007. A great many of the reptile's fossils are from the Tecovas Formation of western Texas. Other finds of Colognathus were from places such as the Palo Duro Canyon (in western Texas) and the Santa Rosa Formation (in New Mexico). One tooth is known from the Blue Mesa Member of the Chinle Formation at Petrified Forest National Park, Arizona. Material from the Middle Triassic (Ladinian) Lower Keuper of southern Germany was originally assigned to Colognathus sp., which would extend the temporal range of the form back to the Middle Triassic. In 2022, these remains, in addition to a partial skull, were described as belonging to a new Colognathus-like taxon, Quasicolognathus, together forming the new family Colognathidae.

== Classification ==
Colognathus was originally named Xenognathus by Ermine Cowles Case in 1928, but that name was preoccupied, so Case provided the replacement name Colognathus in 1933. Researchers have classified Colognathus as a reptile, although its lower-level classification remains uncertain, although it may be a procolophonid.
