= Microzemiotes =

Microzemiotes Temporal range: Norian

Scientific classification
- Kingdom: Animalia
- Phylum: Chordata
- Class: Reptilia
- Clade: Diapsida
- Genus: Microzemiotes; Burch et al., 2024
- Species: M. sonselaensis

Binomial name
- Microzemiotes sonselaensis Burch et al., 2024

Extinct genus of reptiles

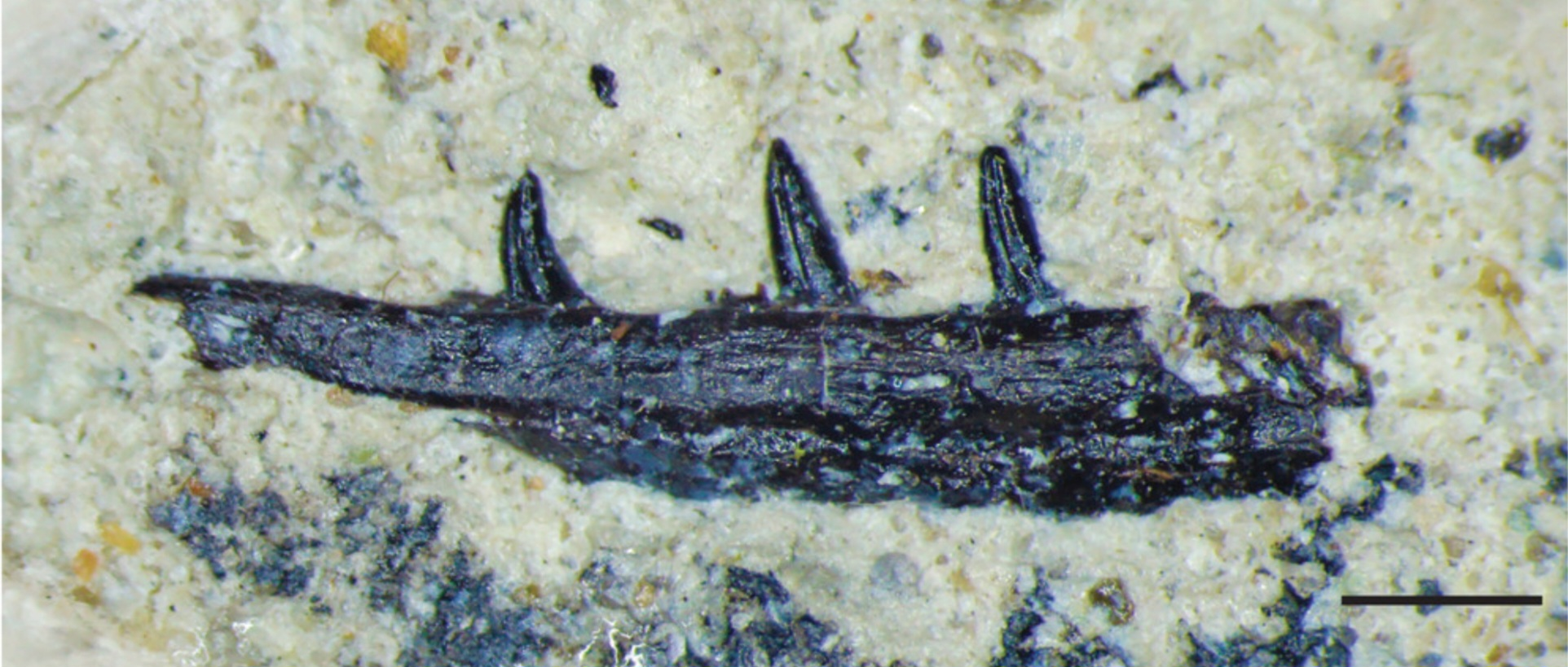
Photograph of the holotype specimen of the Triassic reptile Microzemiotes sonselaensis.

Microzemiotes is an extinct genus of diapsid reptile that inhabited Arizona during the middle Norian stage of the Triassic period. It contains a single species, Microzemiotes sonselaensis. The genus is known from a single partial left dentary (lower jaw bone) bearing three teeth, discovered in the Sonsela Member of the Chinle Formation. Along with Uatchitodon, known only from isolated teeth, it is one of the oldest known reptiles with evidence of a venom delivery system.
