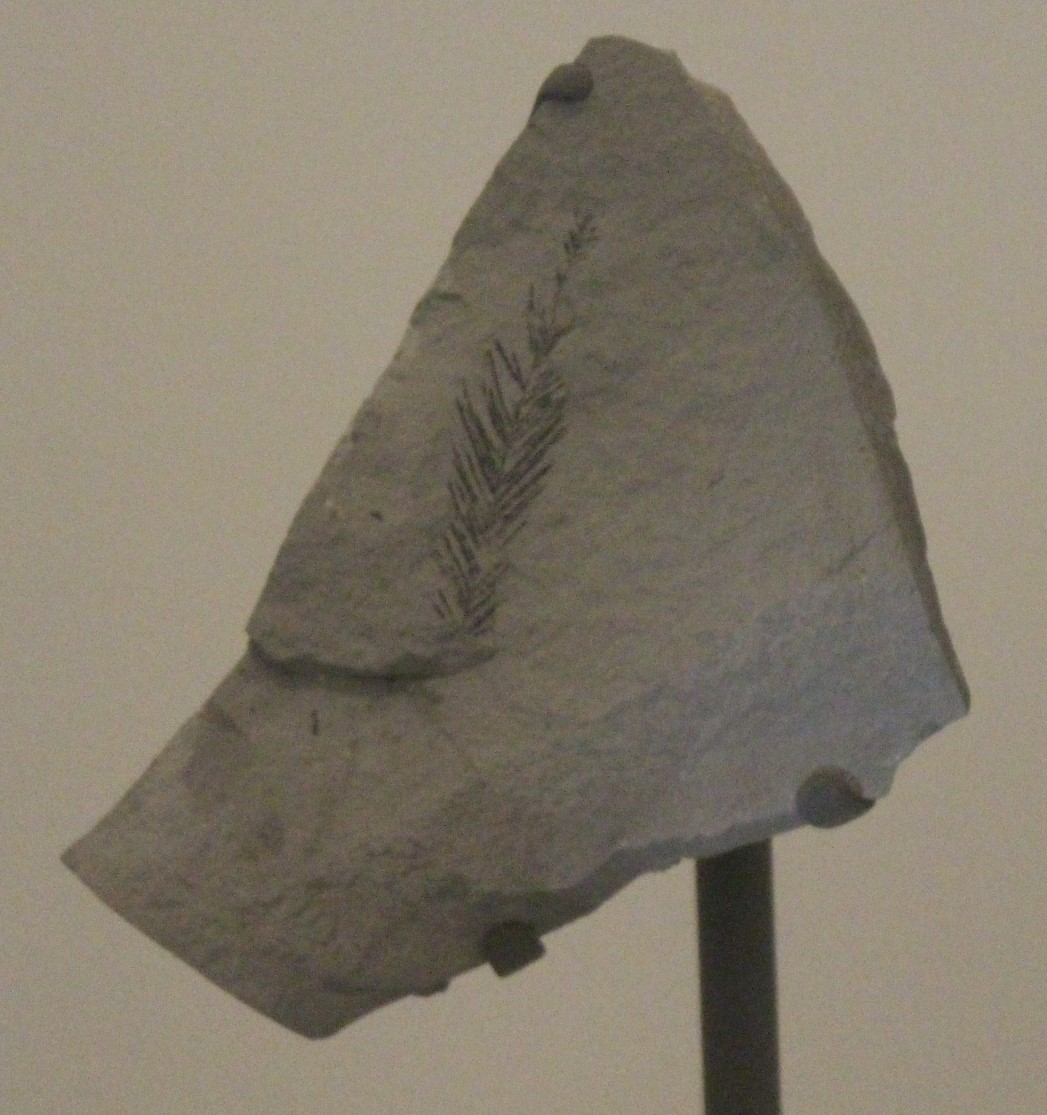
- D. spinosum fossil, National Museum of Natural History

Scientific classification
- Kingdom: Plantae
- Clade: Tracheophytes
- Clade: Gymnospermae
- Division: Gnetophyta
- Genus: †Dinophyton; Ash 1970

Species
- D. spinosum Ash 1970

= Dinophyton =

Dinophyton Temporal range: Late Triassic ~235–221 Ma

Extinct genus of gymnosperm

Dinophyton is an extinct genus of gymnosperm found in late Triassic beds in North America. Its taxonomy is debated, but it may be a gnetophyte with bisaccate pollen.
