= Palacrodon =

Palacrodon Temporal range: Triassic, 251–219 Ma

Scientific classification
- Kingdom: Animalia
- Phylum: Chordata
- Class: Reptilia
- Clade: Parapleurota
- Clade: Neodiapsida
- Genus: †Palacrodon; Broom, 1906

Type species
- †Palacrodon browni Broom, 1906

Other species
- †P. parkeri Jenkins et al., 2024

Synonyms
- P. browni: Fremouwsaurus geludens Gow, 1992

Extinct genus of reptiles

Palacrodon is an extinct genus of Triassic reptile with a widespread distribution. It was initially described from teeth collected in Early Triassic deposits in South Africa, and later reported from the Early Triassic of Antarctica and the Late Triassic of Arizona. Although previously considered an early rhynchocephalian, it is currently considered to be a non-saurian neodiapsid.

== History ==
The type specimen of Palacrodon browni was described from the Early Triassic Cynognathus Assemblage Zone of South Africa by Robert Broom, who classified it in Rhynchocephalia. Malan (1963) questioned the rhynchocephalian placement of Palacrodon, viewing it as either a lizard or procolophonid. A skull collected from the lower part of Fremouw Formation of Antarctica was named Fremouwsaurus geludens by Gow (1992), but that taxon was synonymized with Palacrodon by Gow (1999). Gow also described new material of the genus from South Africa and concluded that Palacrodon itself was not a member of Rhynchocephalia due to its lack of a quadratojugal and the presence of a lacrimal. A later study of the Antarctic specimen showed that much more of the skeleton was present than just the skull.

In 2018, new tooth and jaw material was described from the Adamanian-age Blue Mesa Member of the Chinle Formation in Arizona. This extends the stratigraphic range of the form into the Norian stage of the Late Triassic. In 2024, these specimens were determined to belong to a distinct species and was named P. parkeri. The two species are distinguished by their teeth. P. browni has a pair of parallel ridges on the underside of its tooth crown between its outer and inner edges, gaps beneath where two teeth contact each other, and foramina in the jaw beneath each tooth, while P. parkeri lacks these features. In tetrapods, the pulp cavity of teeth typically matches the shape of the tooth's surface, and the ridges of P. browni are unique amongst tetrapods. The function of these ridges is unclear, but it is hypothesised that they may have provided extra surface area for a soft-tissue attachment to the jaw bone, as Palacrodon has acrodont dentition and so its teeth lack roots. A 2022 paper re-evaluating the Fremouw specimen found it to be closely related to Sauria within the Neodiapsida, and suggested that it may have been arboreal based on the elongated phalanges of the hands.
