= Pelourdea =

Pelourdea Temporal range: Triassic-Middle Jurassic ~252–164 Ma

Scientific classification
- Kingdom: Plantae
- Clade: Embryophytes
- Clade: Tracheophytes
- Clade: Spermatophytes
- Clade: Gymnospermae
- Division: Pinophyta
- Genus: †Pelourdea; Seward 1917

Species
- P. megaphylla P. ploeoensis P. vogesiaca

Extinct genus of conifer

Pelourdea is an extinct genus of conifer. Species belonging to the genus lived from the Triassic to the Middle Jurassic and have been found in Europe and North America.

Members of the genus have long pointed leaves (up to 322 millimeters (12.7 in) long and 32 millimeters (1.3 in) wide) whose base clasps a central shoot. The attachments are spiral. The shoots were 30 to 100 centimeters (12 to 39 in) in height and the plant was likely herbaceous.

The lack of reproductive structures in known fossils have hindered determination of the taxonomy.
