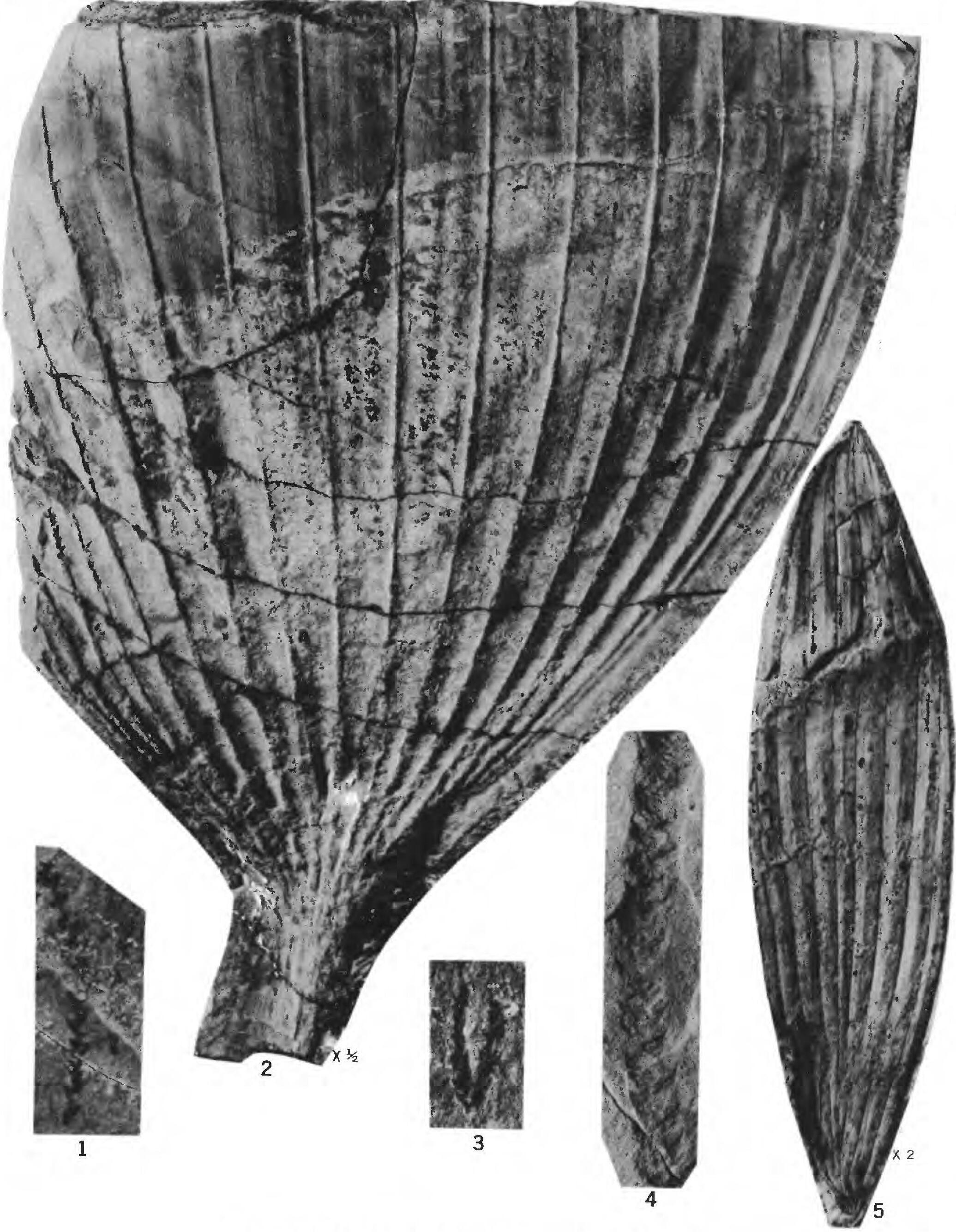
- Plate from the protologue of the genus

Scientific classification
- Kingdom: Plantae
- Clade: Tracheophytes
- Clade: Angiosperms (?)
- Genus: †Sanmiguelia; R.W. Br. (1956)
- Species: †S. lewisii

Binomial name
- †Sanmiguelia lewisii R.W. Br. (1956)

= Sanmiguelia =

Sanmiguelia Temporal range: Norian to Hettangian 227–199.3 Ma

Species of plant

Sanmiguelia is an extinct plant genus, probably of flowering plants. The genus and the species Sanmiguelia lewisii were first described in 1956 from the Late Triassic Chinle Formation in Colorado, and later in Lower Jurassic Moenave Formation in Utah. The species has been suggested to be one of the more primitive angiosperm fossils.

== Description ==
Since Sanmiguelia was first described in 1956, other specimens have been discovered. These suggest that plants were about 60 cm (2 ft) tall, and consisted of a conical stem with helically arranged leaves. The leaves were broadly elliptical, with a pointed apex and a base that clasped the stem. The stems were woody and contained secondary xylem composed of tracheids. Reproductive organs found in the same beds are believed to have belonged to Sanmiguelia. The pollen-bearing organs consist of an axis with many helically arranged microsporophylls, each with a pair of pollen sacs. The ovule-bearing organs consist of an axis bearing structures interpreted as carpels. Pollination is thought to have been carried out by insects.

== Taxonomy ==
The affinities of Sanmiguelia have proved controversial. When first described, the leaves of Sanmiguelia were described as palm-like. Later an affinity with monocots, in particular Veratrum, was suggested. Others questioned this interpretation and suggested that Sanmiguelia was a cycad. When fossil reproductive structures were assigned to Sanmiguelia, it was considered to be a primitive angiosperm that combined features of both monocots and dicots.
