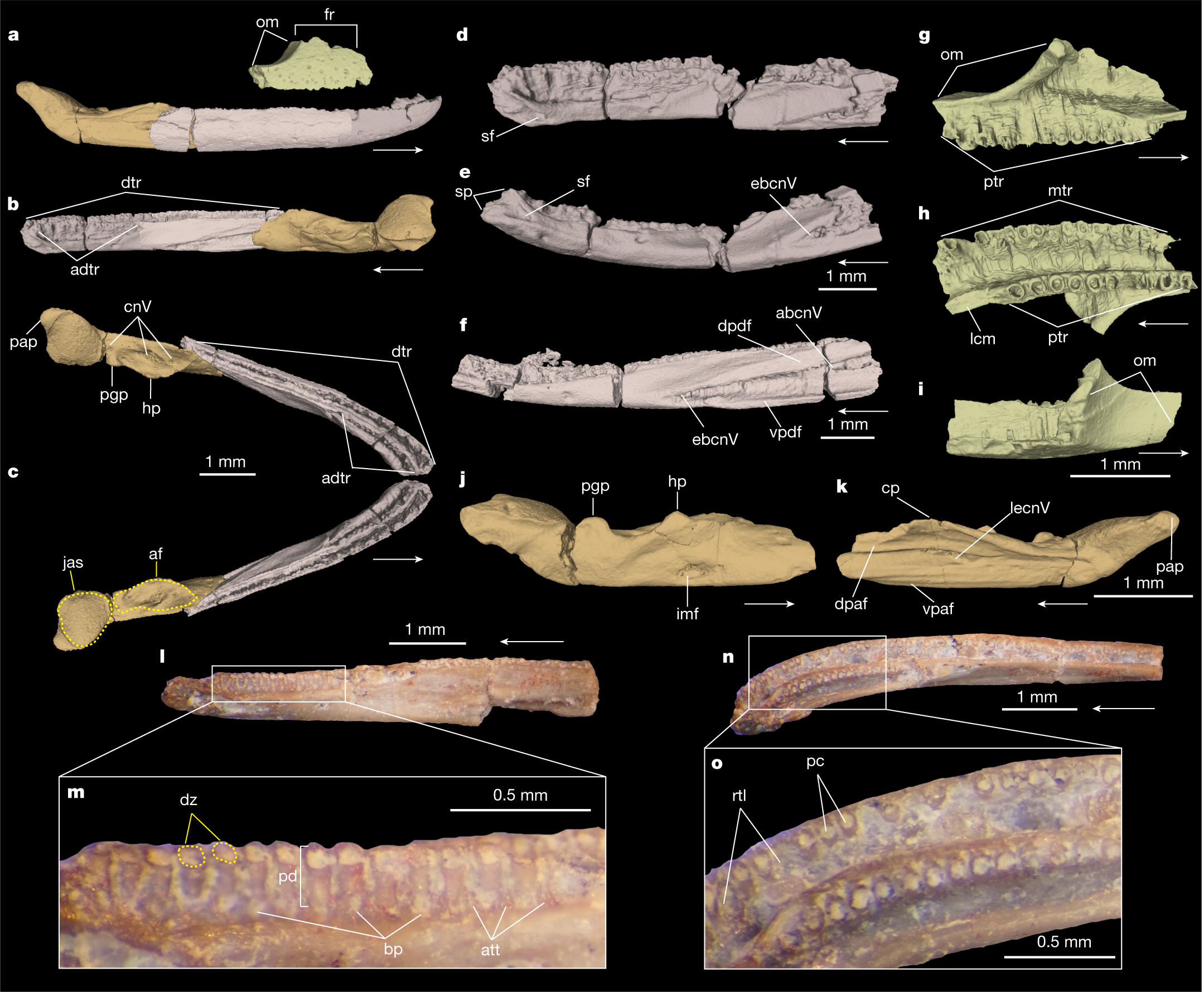
- Holotype and paratype specimens
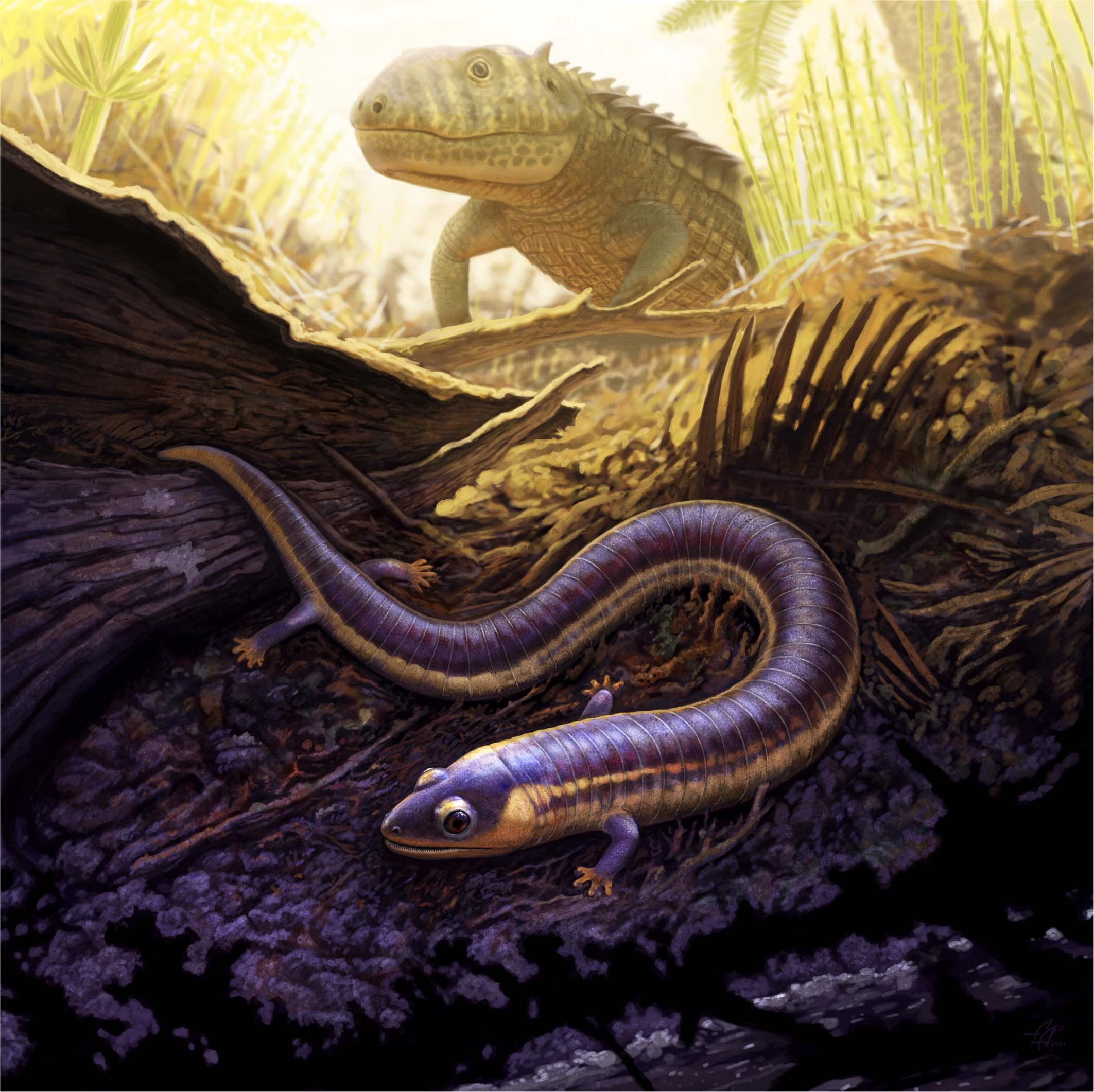
- Life restoration (foreground) with Acaenasuchus (background)

Scientific classification
- Kingdom: Animalia
- Phylum: Chordata
- Class: Amphibia
- Order: Gymnophiona
- Genus: †Funcusvermis; Kligman et al., 2023
- Species: †F. gilmorei

Binomial name
- †Funcusvermis gilmorei Kligman et al., 2023

= Funcusvermis =

Funcusvermis Temporal range: Late Triassic, Norian 223–218 Ma

Extinct genus of amphibians

Funcusvermis is an extinct genus of stem-caecilian from the Late Triassic of Arizona. It is based on a large sample of jaws and other skull and postcranial fragments, discovered in an approximately 220 million years old layer of rock in the Blue Mesa Member of the Chinle Formation at Petrified Forest National Park. There is a single species, called Funcusvermis gilmorei.

The identity of Funcusvermis as a gymnophionan amphibian is supported by a range of traits, including a long additional tooth row in the jaw, a fused maxillopalatine bone in the skull, and a modified jaw with a pseudodentary and pseudoangular. Small femora (thigh bones) indicate that legs were still present in Funcusvermis, despite its modern relatives being completely legless. Funcusvermis is the oldest known gymnophionan, and has the largest known sample of fossils referred to the group. Previously, both records were held by Eocaecilia micropodia, an amphibian from the Early Jurassic Kayenta Formation of Arizona.

The discovery of Funcusvermis provides a strong link between caecilians and other lissamphibians (frogs and salamanders), as well as extinct dissorophoid temnospondyls such as Gerobatrachus. It supports the consensus hypothesis for lissamphibian evolution, with Lissamphibia as a monophyletic group with a single common ancestor among the dissorophoids. Consequently, the anatomy of Funcusvermis helps to compare and contrast alternative hypotheses for lissamphibian origins. For example, a 2017 study proposed that caecilians were related to Chinlestegophis, a stereospondyl from strata of the Chinle Formation in Colorado. This study was scrutinized and its conclusions were rejected by the description of Funcusvermis.

The genus name translates to "funky worm", in reference to the funk song of the same name by the Ohio Players. The species name honors collections manager Ned Gilmore of the Academy of Natural Sciences of Drexel University in Philadelphia, Pennsylvania, United States.

== Classification ==
The following cladogram represents the results of Kligman et al. (2023):

- Dissorophoidea
  - - †Dissorophus multicinctus
    - †Cacops aspidephorus
    - †Broiliellus texensis
    - - †Acheloma cumminsi
      - †Phonerpeton pricei
  - - - †Micromelerpeton credneri
      - †Apateon pedestris
    - - †Micropholis stowi
      - - †Platyrhinops lyelli
        - - †Doleserpeton annectens
          - †Amphibamus grandiceps
          - - †Gerobatrachus hottoni
            - Lissamphibia
              - †Celtedens ibericus
              - Batrachia
              - Gymnophiona
                - †Funcusvermis gilmorei
                - - †Eocaecilia micropodia
                  - - Ichthyophis bannanicus
                    - Epicrionops bicolor
