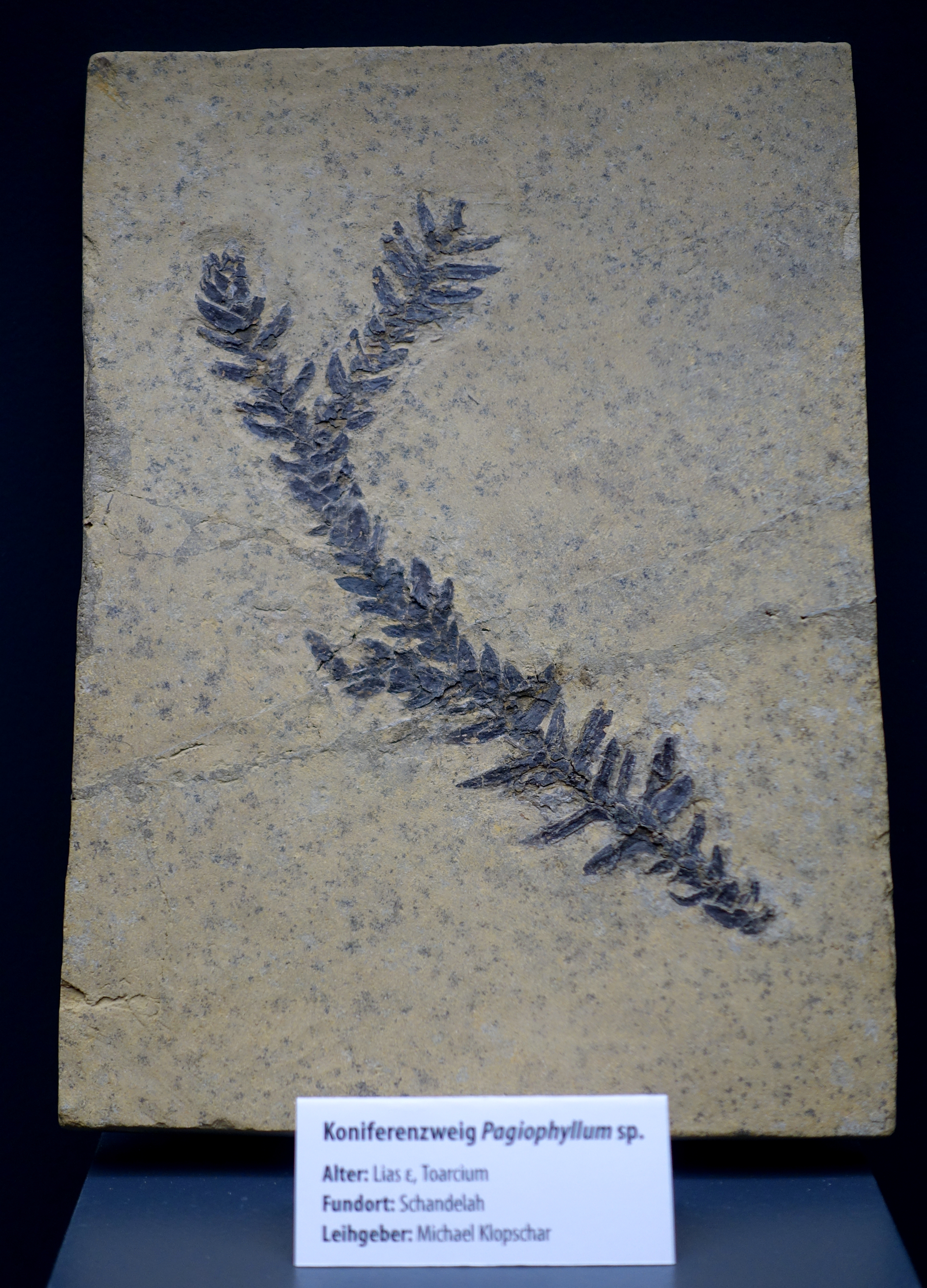
- Pagiophyllum sp. fossil

Scientific classification
- Kingdom: Plantae
- Clade: Tracheophytes
- Clade: Gymnospermae
- Division: Pinophyta
- Class: Pinopsida
- Order: Araucariales
- Family: Araucariaceae
- Genus: †Pagiophyllum; Heer

Species
- P. astrachanense †; P. dubium †; P. foetterlei †; P. sandbergii †; P. sternergianum †; P. steenstrupi †

= Pagiophyllum =

Pagiophyllum Temporal range: Carboniferous–Late Cretaceous

Extinct genus of conifers

Pagiophyllum is a form genus of fossil coniferous plant foliage. Plants of the genus have been variously assigned to several different conifer groups including Araucariaceae and Cheirolepidiaceae. They were found around the globe during the Carboniferous to the Cretaceous period.

== Location of palaeontological sites ==
- In Paleorrota geopark in Brazil. Upper Triassic period, the Santa Maria Formation.
