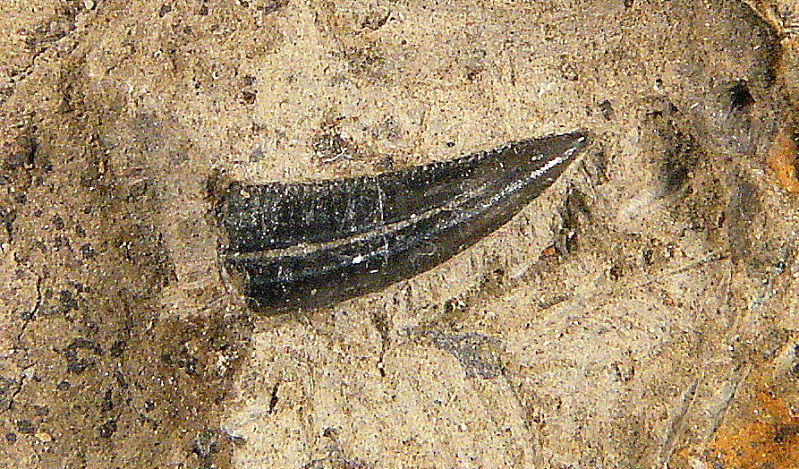

Scientific classification
- Kingdom: Animalia
- Phylum: Chordata
- Class: Reptilia
- Clade: Archosauriformes
- Genus: †Uatchitodon; Sues, 1991

Species
- †U. kroehleri Sues, 1991 (type); †U. schneideri Mitchell et al., 2010

= Uatchitodon =

Uatchitodon Temporal range: Late Triassic Carnian–Norian

Extinct genus of reptiles

Uatchitodon is an extinct genus of Late Triassic reptile known only from isolated teeth. Based on the structure of the teeth, Uatchitodon was probably a carnivorous archosauromorph. Folded grooves on the teeth indicate that the animal was likely venomous, with the grooves being channels for salivary venom. The teeth are similar to those of living venomous squamates such as Heloderma and venomous snakes. Uatchitodon and Microzemiotes are the earliest known potentially venomous reptiles.

== Description and species ==
The genus was first named with the description of the type species U. kroehleri by Hans-Dieter Sues in the journal Nature in 1991. U. kroehleri is known from several teeth found from the early middle Carnian Turkey Branch Formation of the Newark Supergroup in Virginia, uncovered from the Tomahawk locality. The teeth average around 10 mm in length. The tooth crown is strongly labiolingually compressed, recurved, and serrated along both the anterior and posterior edges. The serrations are formed from individual denticles, each of which is further denticulated. On both the labial (outer) and lingual (inner) surfaces of the tooth, there is a deep central groove running longitudinally. The grooves form deep invaginations that constrict the inner pulp cavity of the tooth. The grooves do not reach the tip of the tooth.

A single tooth from the Petrified Forest Formation of the Late Triassic Chinle Group, found at the Placerias Quarry at St. Johns, Arizona, has been identified as one of Uatchitodon. It is slightly younger than the teeth of U. kroehleri found in Virginia. Venom-conducting teeth were first noted from the Placerias Quarry in the 1980s, but they were not interpreted as belonging to Uatchitodon until 1992. The tooth, known as MNA V3680, differs from those of U. kroehleri in that the grooves are fully enclosed and form tubes within the teeth. There are faint furrows at the sutures that enclose these tubes. The tubes, which are presumably venom canals, end at discharge orifices near the tip of the crown. MNA V3680 is the earliest example of a tetrapod with completely enclosed tooth canals for the delivery of oral toxins, which are seen today in elapid snakes.

MNA V3680, along with several other teeth from the Cumnock Formation near Raleigh, North Carolina, represent a second species of Uatchitodon, U. schneideri. This species, although recognized since 1996, remained unnamed until 2010. U. schneideri was named in honor of Vince Schneider of the North Carolina Museum of Natural Sciences. The holotype tooth, known as NCSM 24753, was found from a locality referred to as NCPALEO 1906, along with many other teeth and uncatalogued fragments. NCPALEO 1906, better known as the Moncure microvertebrate locality, was discovered and excavated by Schneider.

The teeth from the Moncure locality are similar to MNA V3680 in that they all have enclosed venom canals that open at the ends of the teeth. The teeth of U. schneideri can be distinguished from those of U. kroehleri by enclosure of the canals as well as a lesser degree of labiolingual compression.

== Paleobiology ==
The tubular venom canals of U. schneideri are similar to those found in the teeth of venomous snakes, while the grooved teeth of U. kroehleri are similar to those of living gila monsters. The teeth of U. kroehleri in the Tomahawk locality are older than those of U. schneideri in the Moncure locality and Placerias quarry, suggesting that the grooved teeth of U. kroehleri developed into the tubular fangs of U. schneideri. A similar transition is thought to have occurred in snakes. The earliest venomous snakes appeared in the Miocene epoch with fully formed tubular fangs, but there is no fossil evidence of earlier snakes with grooved teeth. In the development of living venomous snakes, however, the fangs have open grooves before erupting. One they emerge from the gum line, the fangs have enclosed canals.

The grooves of U. kroehleri may indicate that it had a lifestyle similar to the living gila monster, chewing prey to pass venom into it. With enclosed canals, U. schneideri may have been able to inject venom in a similar way to venomous snakes. Like venomous snakes, it may have been able to pump venom into its prey through venom glands and compressor muscles. However, as the jaws of U. schneideri are not known, there is no evidence for such glands or muscles.
