= Blue Mesa Member =

- Stratigraphic range: Late Triassic, early Norian 223–218 Ma
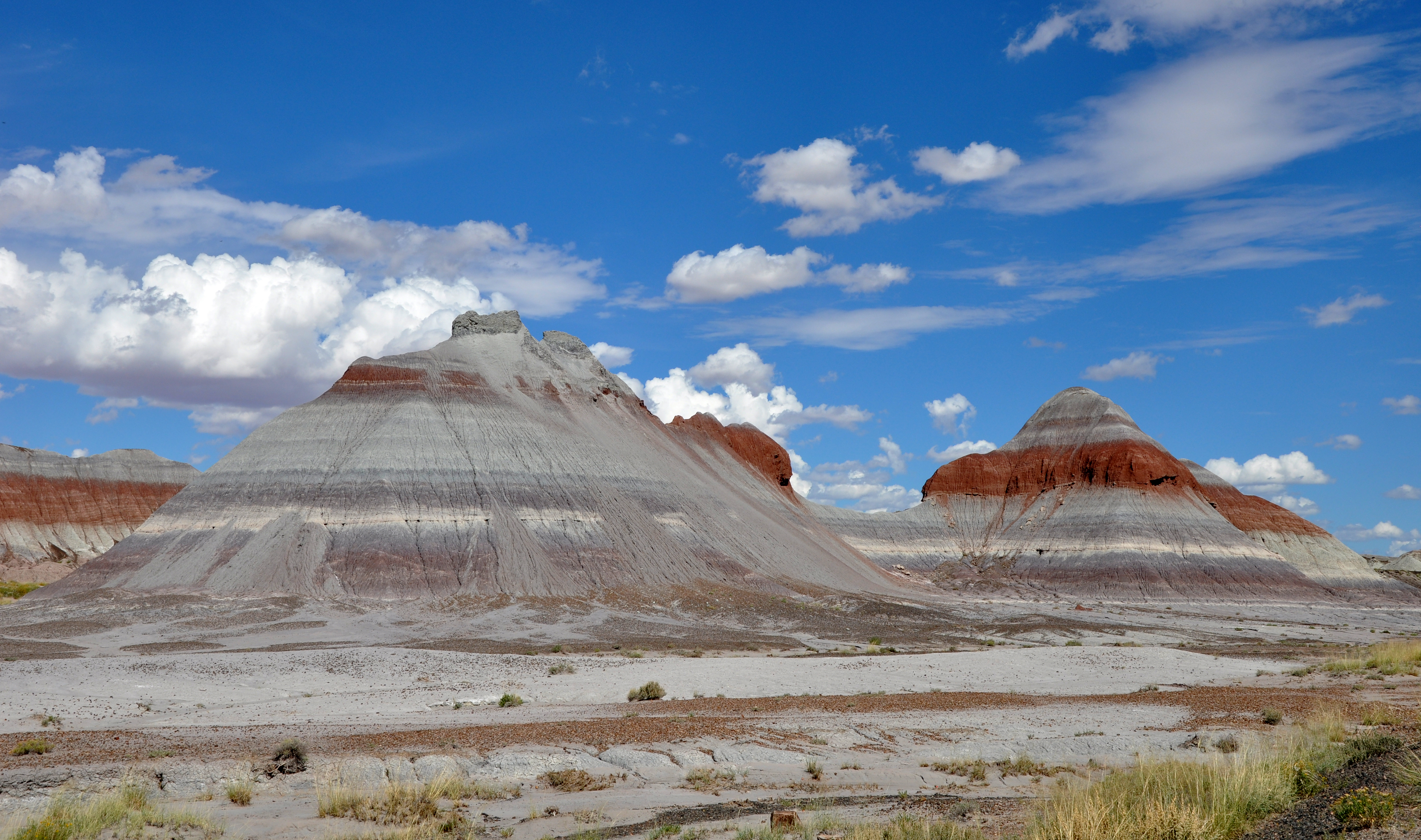
- The Tepees, Petrified Forest National Park
- Type: member
- Unit of: Chinle Formation

Lithology
- Primary: mudstone, sandstone

Location
- Region: Colorado Plateau
- Extent: Arizona, Utah

The Blue Mesa Member is a member of the Chinle Formation. It is located in the Petrified Forest National Park of northeast Arizona.

== Geology ==
The colorful bands of mudstone and sandstone were laid down during the Triassic, when the area was part of a huge tropical floodplain.

== Gallery ==
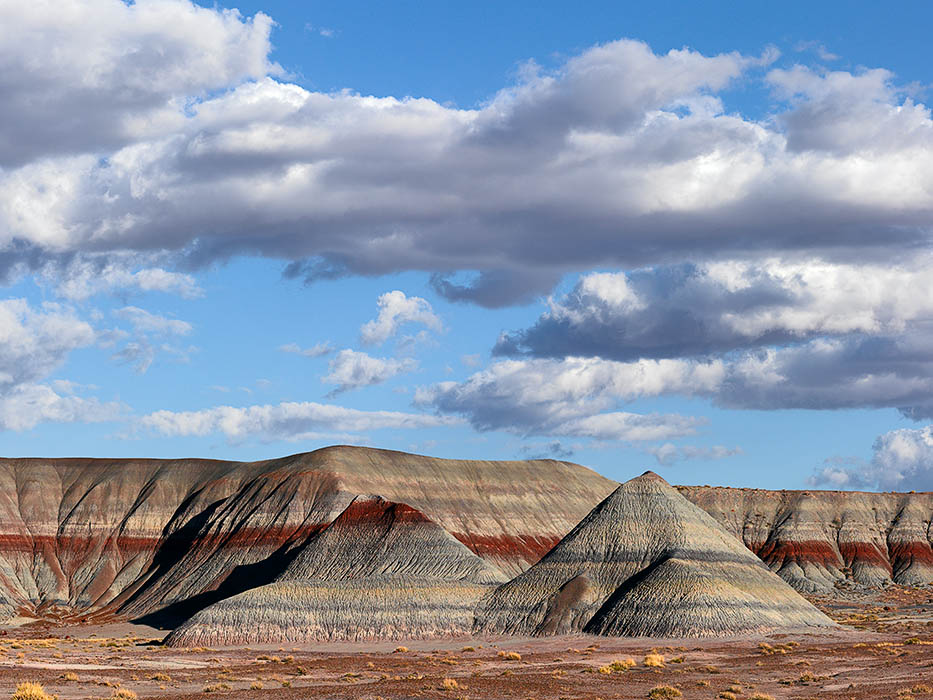
The Tepees

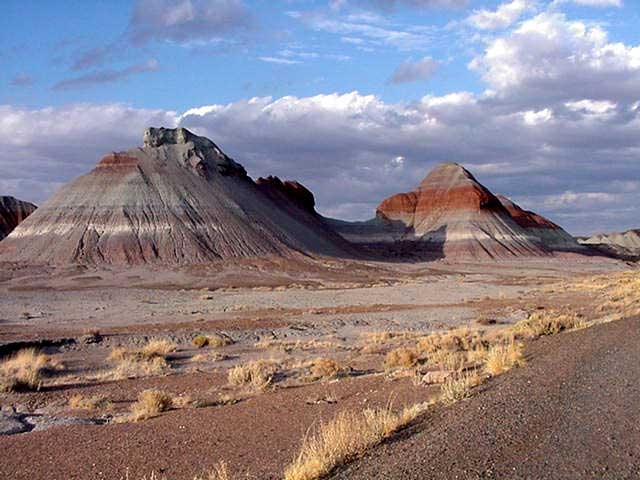
The Tepees

== See also ==
- Chinle Formation

== Literature ==
- Blakey, and Ranney, 2008. Ancient Landscapes of the Colorado Plateau, Ron Blakey, Wayne Ranney, c 2008, Grand Canyon Association (publisher), 176 pages, with Appendix, Glossary, Index. Contains approximately 75 shaded topographic maps, for geology, etc., with 54 (23 pairs, (46)) for Colorado Plateau specifically; others are global, or North American.
- Utah DeLorme Atlas & Gazetteer, 7th Edition, c. 2010, 64 pages, pp. 24, 32.
