= Mauritanichthys =

Mauritanichthys Temporal range: Late Triassic, 237 –227.3 Ma

Scientific classification
- Kingdom: Animalia
- Phylum: Chordata
- Class: Actinopterygii
- Order: †Redfieldiiformes
- Family: †Redfieldiidae
- Genus: †Mauritanichthys; Martin, 1980
- Species: †M. rugosus

Binomial name
- †Mauritanichthys rugosus Martin, 1980

Extinct genus of fish

Mauritanichthys is an extinct genus of palaeoniscoid redfieldiid ray-finned fish from Morocco. It is only known from the Timezgadiouine Formation location within the Atlas Mountains. The deposits date back to the Late Triassic, more specifically the Carnian. It was a small, fusiform fish with a reduced postrostral very similar in morphology to another member of the family Lasalichthys. There is only a single known species being M. rugosus.

== History and naming ==
Though the exact time of the collection of the specimens isn't known, Mauritanichthys was described in 1980 by Michel Martin and is known by multiple specimens including the holotype, ALM 312. These specimens were found at locality 11 of the Timezgadiouine Formation. This locality is a part of the base member of the Irohalene Member (also referred to as "T5") and has yield both body and ichnofossils of a large amount of animals. The name Mauritanichthys derives from both Ancient Greek and Latin; being a combination between mauritanicus, Latin for "from Morocco" and ichthys, a word derived from the Ancient Greek word for fish. The species name "rugosus" is derived from the Latin word for rough or wrinkled.

== Description ==
Mauritanichthys was a small, fusiform fish though it was much larger than other members of the group, measuring to a total of 15 cm (5.9 in.).

=== Skull ===
Mauritanichthys had a skull similar to other redfieldiiforms with rectangular dermosphenotic and dermopterotic bones with the dermosphenotic and multiple infraorbitals making up parts of the orbit. Along with those bones, the adnasal forms the front of the orbits. The postrostral is small is flanked by the nasal bones. Like a number of other redfieldiiforms, Mauritanichthys had a number of tubercles on the front of the skull. The maxilla slender though increases in height below the preopercle and contains a set of large teeth. The opercular region is made up of the operculum and suboperculum with these bones being a little taller than they are wide. Just like other members of the group, the branchiostegal elements are reduced with only one being present.

=== Postcrania ===
Mauritanichthys had a tall body, with the tallest section being right behind the head. The squamation was made of at least 40 rows, made up of 16-17 scales each depending on the part of the body. The pectoral fins were made up of seven to eight unsegmented rays and a pair of fringing fulcra. The only other fin to be preserved would be the pelvic fins which were made up of seven to eight rays that, unlike the pectoral fins, were segmented.

== Classification ==
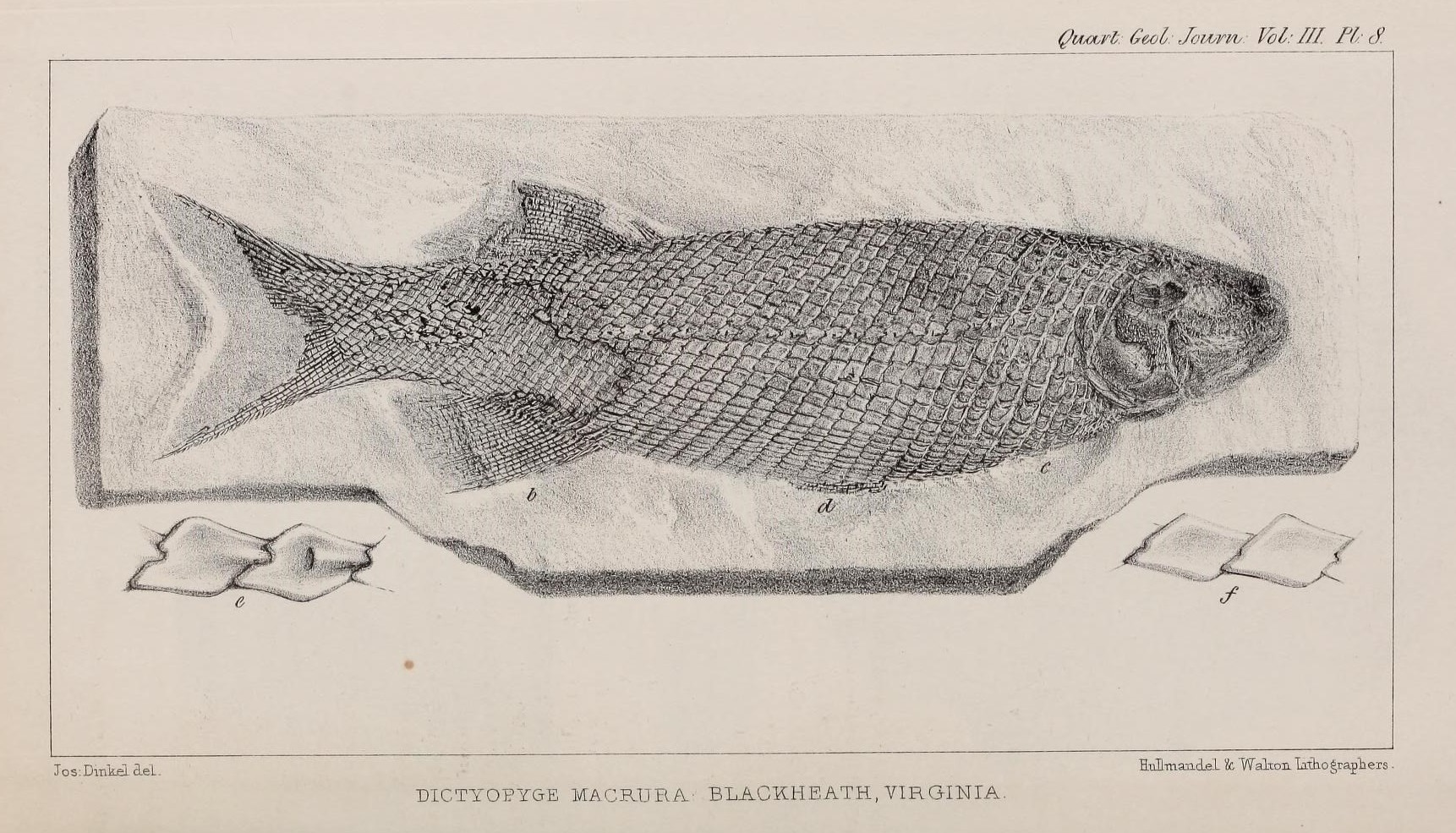
Dictyopyge, another genus of redfieldiiform

The relationship between Mauritanichthys and Lasalichthys had been suggested from the original description due to the extreme similarities in the skulls. Even with this, the interrelationships of the group were not expanded upon until Schaffer (1984) where this relationship was confirmed along with their relation to other members of the group described at the time. Shown below is the phylogenic tree from said paper.

- - Atopocephala
  - Schizurichthys
  - - Ischiolepis
    - - Brookvalia
      - Phlycloenichthys
  - - Helichthys
    - - - Geitonichthys
        - Molybdichthys
      - - Daedalichthys
        - - - Cionichthys
            - Dictyopyge
            - Redfieldius
          - - Mauritanichthys
            - - Lasalichthys
              - Synorichthys

== Paleoenvironment ==
Like all other known redfieldiiformes, Mauritanichthys would have lived in freshwater environments with the base part of the Irohalene Member representing the alluvial plain. This plain would have been made up of a large amount of meandering rivers and large floodplains. The humid area would have had a warm, seasonal climate which would have flooded at certain points of the year. Younger strata show a gradual decrease in borrows and other ichnofossils, with it representing a change to more arid conditions. A large diversity of vertebrates have been found in the represented strata including dicynodonts, archosaurs, and temnospondyls. Some of the more notable members of this paleobiota including the metoposaurid Dutuitosaurus and the silesaur Diodorus.
