= Buettneria =

Buettneria can refer to:

- Koskinonodon, an extinct genus of large temnospondyl amphibian, originally described as Buettneria, a name later found to be preoccupied, before being synonymized with Anaschisma
- Buettnererpeton, an extinct genus of large temnospondyl amphibian, originally described as Buettneria bakeri
- Tecovaserpeton, an extinct genus of large temnospondyl amphibian, originally described as Buettneria perfecta
- Buettneria (katydid), a genus of bush crickets or katydids in the family Tettigoniidae, subfamily Phaneropterinae
- Buettneria (gastropod), a genus of land snails in the family Urocyclidae
