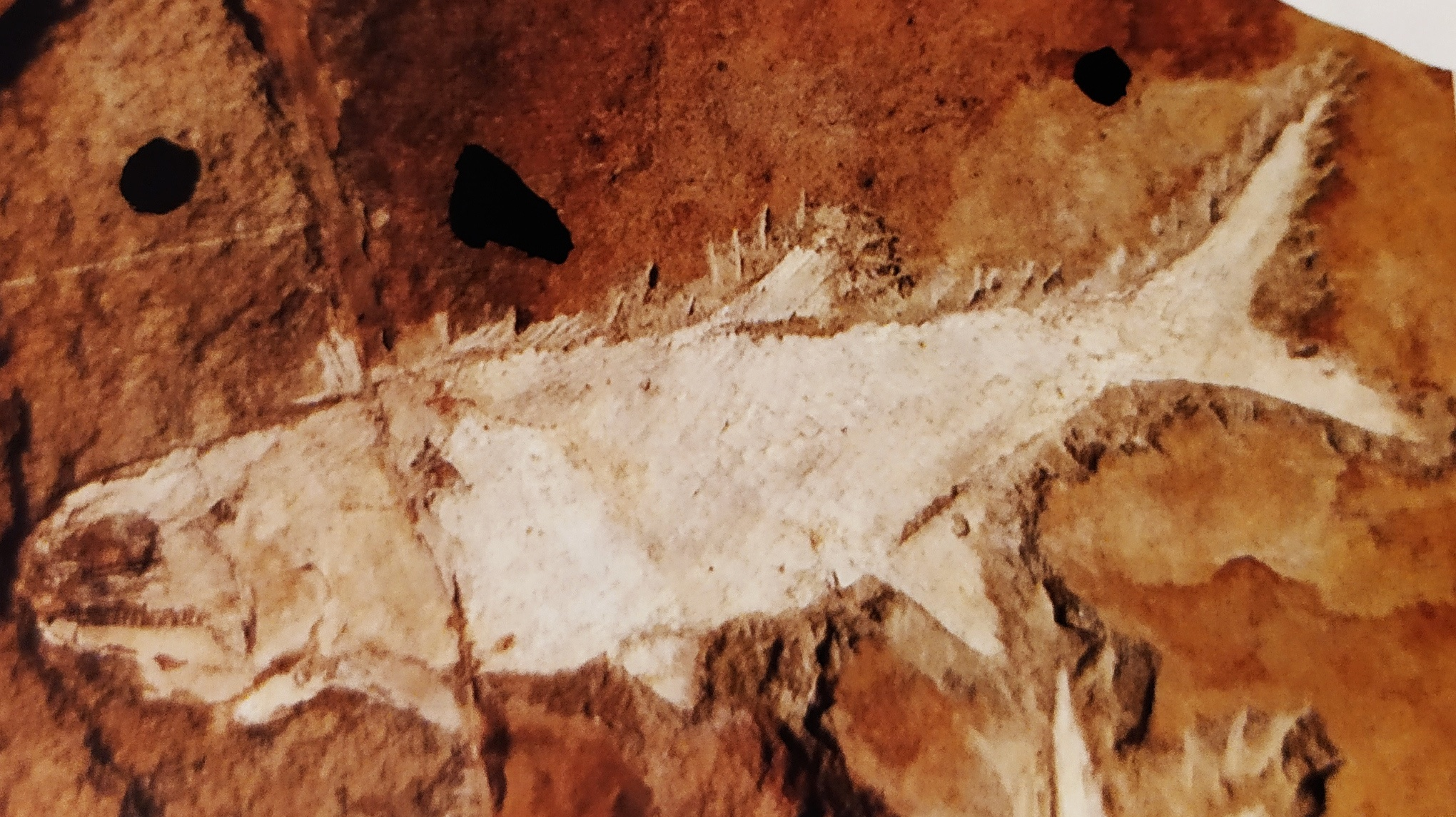
- Dicellopyge draperi fossil

Scientific classification
- Kingdom: Animalia
- Phylum: Chordata
- Class: Actinopterygii
- Family: †Dicellopygidae; Romer, 1945
- Genus: †Dicellopyge; Brough, 1931

Type species
- Dicellopyge macrodentata Brough, 1931

Species
- D. draperi (Woodward, 1931) (=D. macrodentata Brough, 1931); D. lissocephalus Brough, 1931; ?D. tenuis Broom, 1909

Synonyms
- Dicellopygae Brough, 1931

= Dicellopyge =

Dicellopyge Temporal range: Anisian

Extinct genus of fishes

Dicellopyge is an extinct genus of freshwater ray-finned fish that lived during the early Anisian age of the Middle Triassic epoch in what is now South Africa. It was originally named "Dicellopygae" by James Brough but the name was later corrected to Dicellopyge by Peter Hutchinson.

Dicellopyge is known from the lower Cynognathus Assemblage Zone, where it coexisted with fish such as Lissodus, Elonichthys, Ceratodus, Coelacanthus, Helichthys, Meidiichthys, and Atopocephala.

== Classification ==
It is the only member of the family Dicellopygidae. Under a former treatment of an expanded Palaeonisciformes, it has been referred to the Palaeoniscidae as a close relative of Acrolepis, Cornuboniscus, Belichthys, and the Amblypteridae. However, such a classification is now considered paraphyletic.

== Appearance ==
It is characterized by a short, blunt snout and a deeply cleft tail fin. Two species are known, D. draperi (Woodward, 1931) (=D. macrodentata) and D. lissocephalus Brough, 1931, which were contemporaries and differed in scale and tail fin morphology.
