= Doswell Formation =

Geologic formation in the United States

- Stratigraphic range: Upper Triassic, early Carnian
- Type: Formation
- Unit of: Chatham Group
- Sub-units: Stagg Creek Member, Vinita Member, Irishtown Member, Lahaska Creek Member
- Underlies: Stockton Formation
- Overlies: Petersburg Granite, Evangeline Formation
- Thickness: 2,000 ft (610 m)

Location
- Region: Virginia, Pennsylvania

Type section
- Named for: Doswell, Virginia
- Named by: Robert E. Weems

The Doswell Formation (also known as the Doswell Group) is a geologic unit of Upper Triassic age, part of the Newark Supergroup. The Doswell Formation was originally named to refer to a geological sequence which forms the lower part of the sedimentary fill of the Taylorsville Basin in Virginia and Maryland. This sequence was deposited by lakes and rivers in the developing rift basin. A 2016 study argued that several geological layers in Pennsylvania as well as the neighboring Richmond Basin of Virginia also qualified as components of the Doswell Formation.

The most diverse and fossiliferous component of the Doswell formation is the Vinita member, also sometimes known as the Turkey Branch, Tuckahoe, or Falling Creek Formations in earlier publications, and frequently referred to as the Vinita Formation by many authors. The Doswell formation is biostratigraphically characterized by a fauna including the fish Dictyopyge macrurus and the conchostracan Laxitextella multireticulata. The Richmond Basin has several notable fossil sites, such as the Tomahawk site which has hundreds of fossils from the cynodont Boreogomphodon, and the Winterpock site which has an extraordinarily diverse assortment of plants. The Taylorsville Basin is much more restricted in terms of fossil locales, but it was home to the unusual armored reptile Doswellia.

The Doswell Formation is among the oldest Triassic formations on the east coast of the United States. It is believed to belong to the early Carnian (Cordevolian) age of the Triassic based on its fauna and flora, which is distinctly dominated by tetrapods similar to gondwanan groups, as well as a high diversity of humidity-loving plants such as ferns and cycads. This gives it a distinct disconnect from the younger formations of the Newark Supergroup, which typically have a fauna similar to the Triassic formations of the western United States and a flora including elements such as conifer trees, which are better adapted for drier conditions.

== History and stratigraphy ==
=== Weems (1980)'s interpretation ===
The Doswell Formation was originally described by USGS paleontologist Robert E. Weems in 1980. He used it to refer to the entire Triassic geological sequence preserved at the Taylorsville basin, overlying the much older Carboniferous "Petersburg granite" which predated the basin, and underlying much younger Cretaceous and Cenozoic gravel. Weems subdivided the formation into several "members". The oldest of these (middle Carnian in age) was the Stagg Creek Member, a fluvial (river) deposit of sandstone and conglomerate. Weems originally described this layer as lacking fossils, although later studies argued otherwise.

Overlying the Stagg Creek Member was what Weems called the Falling Creek Member (late middle Carian). As sediments began to slow down the rivers of the Stagg Creek Member, lacustrine (lake) deposits began to form. Rivers still managed to flow into the now dominant lakes from different directions, depositing a diverse assortment of sediments. This allowed the Falling Creek Member to contain a variety of rock types, including sandstone, shale, siltstone, and occasionally even coal. In addition, it is the most fossiliferous part of the Taylorsville basin, containing the fossils of not only fish and invertebrates, but also reptiles such as the heavily armored Doswellia.

The youngest (early late Carnian) and most geographically extensive member was the Newfound Member, named after the Newfound river. Outcrops belonging to this member either contain coarse sandstone and conglomerate, or much finer sandstone and siltstone. This member is believed to have been formed by a vast alluvial fan or delta created by southeastern-flowing rivers, and Araucarioxylon (petrified wood) is occasionally found within the member.

=== Cornet & Olsen (1990)'s interpretation ===
In 1990, paleontologists Bruce Cornet & Paul Olsen described the Triassic fauna and flora of Virginia in detail. They argued that the Stagg Creek and Falling Creek Members actually coexisted at the same time, based on palynological correlations. In addition, they noted that the Stagg Creek actually preserved a few fossils, mainly of crustaceans and the abundant fish Dictyopyge.

=== LeTourneau (2003)'s interpretation ===
In 2003, Columbia University geologist Peter LeTourneau became the first geologist to argue that the Doswell Formation was not the only Triassic geological layer in the Taylorsville Basin. He recognized the existence of a younger layer, which he called the King George Group. The King George Group was an extensive geological interval dominated by sandstone and conglomerate. LeTourneau also elevated the ranking of the Doswell Formation, renaming it to the Doswell Group. In conjunction with this, he also elevated the Falling Creek, and Newfound Members to formations. However, he also placed the Newfound Formation outside of the Doswell Group, instead placing it as the oldest unit of the King George Group.

LeTourneau also evaluated Cornet & Olsen's claim that the Stagg Creek member coexisted with the Falling Creek Formation. He found that there were actually several distinct units grouped as part of the Stagg Creek unit. The original Stagg creek site which Weems (1980) based the member off of was found to belong to the middle portion of the Falling Creek Formation, therefore making the Stagg Creek Member part of that Formation. The portion of the Falling Creek Formation which was younger than the Stagg Creek Member was designated the Poor Farm Member, while the older portion was designated the Deer Creek Member. LeTourneau also added an additional formation to the Doswell Group, the South Anna Formation. This formation, the oldest section in the group, was very similar to the Stagg Creek Member in terms of its geological appearance and thickness, and as such South Anna outcroppings were originally considered to belong to the Stagg Creek Member according to Weems (1980). LeTournea differentiated the two based on their age, as determined by palynological dating.

=== Weems, Tanner, & Lucas (2016)'s interpretation ===
In 2016, several paleontologists and geologists cooperated in a project which meant to correlate the individual Triassic basins of the Newark Supergroup with each other. They found that the Richmond and Taylorsville basins were likely deposited at the same time, a suspicion voiced earlier by Cornet & Olsen (1990). In light of this revelation, they set out to link the formations and members of the Richmond Basin with those of the Taylorsville. They deranked the Doswell Group back to the Doswell Formation, and also found that the differences between the South Anna Formation and the Stagg Creek Member were not statistically significant. As a result, they abandoned the designation of the South Anna Formation, synonymizing it with the Stagg Creek Member as originally considered in 1980. They additionally found that the "barren beds" of the Richmond Basin (and several thinner slivers of strata in other basins) were also synonymous with the Stagg Creek Member.

The Falling Creek Formation was more thoroughly deconstructed. Weems, Tanner, & Lucas found that this formation was basically identical to the Vinita Member (or "Vinita beds") of the Richmond basin. As the Vinita member was named approximately 70 years earlier than the Falling Creek Formation, it was considered to take priority in naming. The Poor Farm and Deer Creek members of the Falling Creek Formation were also abandoned due to being poorly defined by LeTourneau.

These authors not only found the Doswell Formation to extend to the Richmond basin, but also to several other Triassic basins in Eastern Pennsylvania. For example, the "Irishtown beds" at the base of the Gettysburg basin were found to be a young layer of the Doswell Formation (the Irishtown Member) due to conchostracan dating. Lastly, an unusually old section of the Stockton Formation was also found to be a young part of the Doswell Formation (as the Lahaska Creek Member) due to preserving fossils of Calamops, a temnospondyl amphibian which lived at the same time as the Doswell Formation.

== Paleobiota ==
=== Tetrapods ===
Genus	Species	Sub-unit	Basin	Abundance	Notes	Images
Boreogomphodon	B. jeffersoni	Vinita member (Tomahawk assemblage)	Richmond	"hundreds of specimens"	A traversodontid cynodont	
Calamops	C. paludosis	Lahaska Creek member	Newark		A temnospondyl	
Doswellia	D. kaltenbachi	Vinita member	Taylorsville, Richmond?	Partial skeleton, isolated bones	An archosauriform	
Euscolosuchus	E. olseni	Vinita member (Tomahawk assemblage)	Richmond	Armor scutes, vertebrae, and ribs	An archosauriform, possibly related to Crocodyliformes	
Gomphiosauridion	G. baileyae	Vinita member (Tomahawk assemblage)	Richmond	skull fragments	A procolophonid	
Idiosaura	I. virginiensis	Vinita Formation (Tomahawk assemblage)	Richmond	Partial dentaries	A kuehneosaurid-like lepidosauromorph with pleurodont dentition.	
Lacertilia indet.?		Vinita member (Tomahawk assemblage)	Richmond			
Lissamphibia indet.?		Vinita member	Richmond	jaw fragment		
Microconodon	M. tenuirostris	Vinita member (Tomahawk assemblage)	Richmond	Teeth and jaw bones	A cynodont	
Micromenodon	M. pitti	Vinita Formation (Tomahawk assemblage)	Richmond	Partial maxilla	An early sphenodont lepidosaur with acrodont dentition.	
Phytosauria indet.		Vinita member	Richmond, Taylorsville	teeth		
Poposaurus	P. gracilis	Vinita member	Taylorsville	vertebrae, partial humerus	A bipedal poposaurid suchian. Initially considered an indeterminate rauisuchid by Weems (1980).	
Rhynchocephalia indet.		Vinita member (Tomahawk assemblage)	Richmond	skull fragments		
Uatchitodon	U. kroehleri	Vinita member (Tomahawk assemblage)	Richmond	teeth	A venomous reptile	
Vinitasaura	V. lizae	Vinita Formation (Tomahawk assemblage)	Richmond	Jaws	A deep-jawed lepidosauromorph with subthecodont dentition.	
Xenodiphyodon	X. petraios	Vinita member (Tomahawk assemblage)	Richmond	partial jaw with teeth	A possible procolophonian	

=== Fish ===
Genus	Species	Sub-unit	Basin	Abundance	Notes	Images
Cionichthys	C. meekeri	Vinita member	Richmond, Taylorsville		A redfieldiid	
Coelacanthiformes indet.		Vinita member	Richmond			
Dictyopyge	D. macrurus	Stagg Creek member, Vinita member	Richmond, Taylorsville	Abundant	A redfieldiid	
Lissodus	L. sp.	Vinita member (Tomahawk assemblage)	Richmond	teeth	A hybodont shark	
Tanaocrossus	T. sp.	Vinita member	Richmond		A palaeonisciform	

=== Invertebrates ===
Genus	Species	Sub-unit	Basin	Abundance	Notes	Images
Darwinula		Vinita member, Stagg Creek member	Richmond, Taylorsville		Ostracods	
Gastropoda indet.		Vinita member	Richmond, Taylorsville		Snails	
Laxitextella	L. multireticulata	Stagg Creek member, Vinita member, Irishtown member	Richmond, Taylorsville, Gettysburg	Abundant	A conchostracan (clam shrimp)	
Unionidae indet.		Vinita member	Taylorsville		Clams	

=== Pteridophytes (spore-bearing plants) ===
Genus	Species	Sub-unit	Basin	Abundance	Notes	Images
Auriculophora	A. acrostichoides	Vinita member (Winterpock assemblage)	Richmond		A marattialean fern	
Cladophlebis	C. auriculata, C. mexicana	Vinita member	Richmond		A filicalean fern	
Clathropteris	C. meniscoides	Vinita member (Winterpock assemblage)	Richmond		A dipterid fern	
Cyathocaulis	C. carolinensis	Vinita member (Winterpock assemblage)	Richmond		A cyatheaceaen tree fern	
Cyathoforma (Asterotheca, Asterocarpus)	C. carolinensis, C. minuta, C. penticarpa	Stagg Creek member, Vinita member	Richmond, Taylorsville	common	A large tree fern	
Danaeopsis	D. virginiensis	Vinita member (Winterpock assemblage)	Richmond		A marattialean fern	
Dicranopteris	D. sp.	Vinita member (Winterpock assemblage)	Richmond		A forked fern	
Equisetites	E. richmondensis, E. rogersii	Stagg Creek member, Vinita member	Richmond, Taylorsville	common	A horsetail	
Gleichenites	G. distans	Vinita member (Winterpock assemblage)	Richmond	common	A forked fern	
Isoetodendron	I. striata	Vinita member (Winterpock assemblage)	Richmond		A quillwort	
Leptocyclotes	L. americana	Vinita member (Winterpock assemblage)	Richmond		A quillwort	
Lonchopteris	L. oblonga	Vinita member (Winterpock assemblage)	Richmond		A fern	
Mertensides	M. bullatus	Vinita member (Winterpock assemblage)	Richmond	common	A fern	
Neocalamites	N. virginiensis,N. delawarensis	Stagg Creek member, Vinita member	Richmond, Taylorsville	common	A horsetail	
Osmundites	O. winterpockensis	Vinita member (Winterpock assemblage)	Richmond		An osmunadcean fern	
Pecopteris	P. rarinervis	Vinita member	Richmond		A type of leaf referable to several types of plants	
Phlebopteris	P. smithii	Stagg Creek member	Taylorsville		A matoniacean fern	
Pteridocaulis	P. rhombiformis, P. facialis	Vinita member (Winterpock assemblage)	Richmond		Stem of a tree fern	
Todites (Acrostichites)	T. linnaeaefolius	Stagg Creek member, Vinita member	Richmond, Taylorsville	common	A fern	

=== Gymnosperms ===
Genus	Species	Sub-unit	Basin	Abundance	Notes	Images
Macrotaeniopteris	M. crassinervis, M. magnifolia	Stagg Creek member, Vinita member	Richmond, Taylorsville	common	A cycad	
Plicarizamites	P. lanceolatus	Vinita member (Winterpock assemblage)	Richmond			
Podozamites	P. lanceolatus, P. tenuistriatus	Stagg Creek member, Vinita member	Richmond, Taylorsville		A type of leaf referable to conifers	
Primaraucaria	P. wielandii	Vinita member	Richmond	fairly common	An araucariacean conifer	
Pterophyllum	P. affinae, P. braunianum, P. inaequale, P. giganteum, P. grandifolium, P. taxinum, P. tenuinervis	Stagg Creek member, Vinita member	Richmond, Taylorsville	Very common	A cycadeoid bennetitalean	
Sagenopteris	S. rhoifolia	Vinita member (Winterpock assemblage)	Richmond		A seed fern	
Sphenobaiera	S. striata	Stagg Creek member, Vinita member	Richmond, Taylorsville	common	A ginkgophyte	
Sphenopteris	S. sitholeyi	Stagg Creek member, Vinita member	Richmond, Taylorsville	common	A seed fern	
Sphenozamites	S. rogersianus	Stagg Creek member, Vinita member	Richmond, Taylorsville	common	A cycad	
Stangerites	S. obliqua, S. planus	Vinita member (Winterpock assemblage)	Richmond		A cycad	
Taeniopteris	T. diminuta	Vinita member (Winterpock assemblage)	Richmond	common	Leaves of a Pentoxylon-like plant	
Triassiflorites	T. grandiflora	Vinita member (Winterpock assemblage)	Richmond		A cone, possibly from a bennetitalean	
Zamiostrobus	Z. lissocardius	Vinita member (Winterpock assemblage)	Richmond		A cone from a cycad or conifer	
Zamites	Z. powellii	Stagg Creek member	Taylorsville		A cycadeoid bennetitalean	
