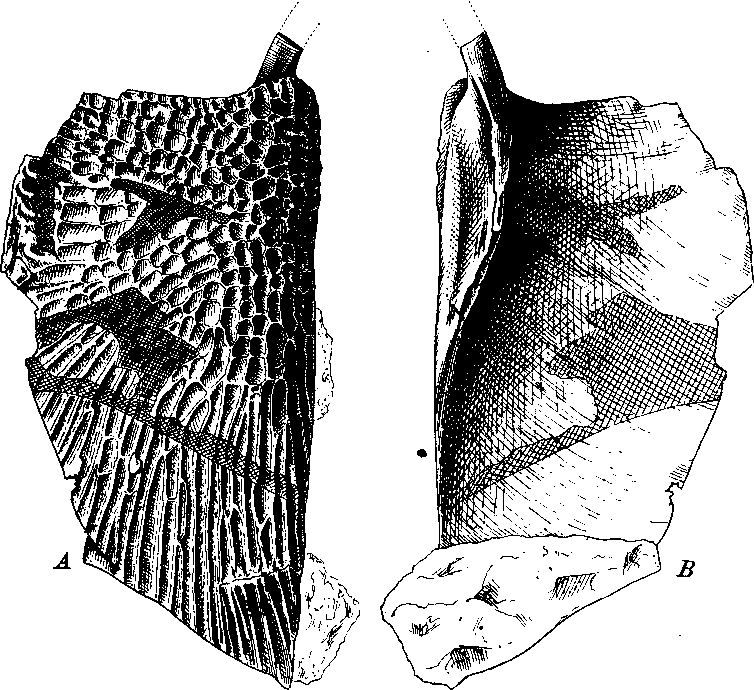
- Left clavicular plate of ?Eupelor durus seen from the outer aspect (left) and the inner aspect (right)

Scientific classification
- Kingdom: Animalia
- Phylum: Chordata
- Clade: Tetrapoda
- Order: †Temnospondyli
- Suborder: †Stereospondyli
- Family: †Metoposauridae
- Genus: †Eupelor; Cope, 1868

Type species
- †Eupelor durus Cope, 1868

Synonyms
- Calamops paludosus? Sinclair, 1917; Mastodonsaurus durus Cope, 1866; Metoposaurus (Metopias) durus Cope, 1866

= Eupelor =

Eupelor Temporal range: Late Triassic, 221.5–205.6 Ma

Genus of temnospondyl amphibian (fossil)

Eupelor is a Latin verb that means "to feast" or " to fine sumptuously". It is a dubious genus of prehistoric amphibian belonging to the temnospondyl family Metoposauridae. Fossils have been found in present-day Pennsylvania, within the Newark Supergroup, dating to the Late Triassic (Norian).

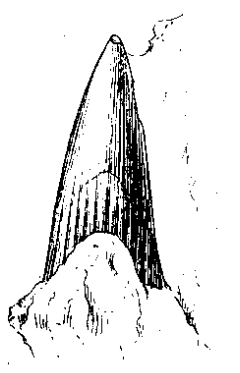
Possible tooth AMNH 2333

== Taxonomy ==
The Eupelor type species, E. durus, was named Mastodonsaurus durus by Edward Drinker Cope in 1866 on the basis of AMNH 3927, a number of clavicles and the tooth AMNH 2333 (which could have belonged to a different temnospondyl apart from Eupelor), from the Lockatong Formation (Phoenixville Tunnel site) of Phoenixville, Pennsylvania. In 1868 Cope allocated the species to its own genus, Eupelor, based on differences from Metoposaurus (then known as Metopias).

Colbert and Imbrie (1956) reviewed all Triassic metoposaurids and concluded that Eupelor should be used for all metoposaurids from North America, especially Koskinonodon (now known as Anaschisma). The authors considered the trematosaur Calamops a possible synonym of Eupelor. Later, Chowdbury (1965) subsumed Eupelor into Metoposaurus along with other North American metoposaurids. Hunt (1993), however, treated Eupelor as a dubious genus of metoposaurid due to its non-diagnostic nature.
