= Panthasaurus =

Panthasaurus Temporal range: Norian, 227–220 Ma

Scientific classification
- Domain: Eukaryota
- Kingdom: Animalia
- Phylum: Chordata
- Order: †Temnospondyli
- Suborder: †Stereospondyli
- Family: †Metoposauridae
- Genus: †Panthasaurus; Chakravorti and Sengupta, 2018
- Species: †P. maleriensis

Binomial name
- †Panthasaurus maleriensis (Chowdbury, 1965)

Synonyms
- Buettneria maleriensis (Chowdbury, 1965); Metoposaurus maleriensis Chowdbury, 1965

Extinct genus of temnospondyls

Panthasaurus is an extinct genus of large temnospondyl belonging to the family Metoposauridae that lived in India during the Late Triassic (Norian) of central India. It contains one species, Panthasaurus maleriensis from the Lower Maleri Formation of India.

== Taxonomy ==
Metoposaurus maleriensis was coined by Chowdbury (1965) for metoposaurid remains from the Maleri Formation in the Pranhita–Godavari Basin of eastern India. Later, Hunt (1993) transferred the species to the genus Buettneria, which was followed by Sulej (2002).

In a paper published in 2018, Chakravorti and Sengupta concluded that specimens of Metoposaurus maleriensis formed a morphospace and morphotype distinct from metoposaurids found in Laurasia. They erected a new genus, Panthasaurus, for M. maleriensis.

== See also ==
- Triassic–Jurassic extinction event
- Timeline of paleontology
