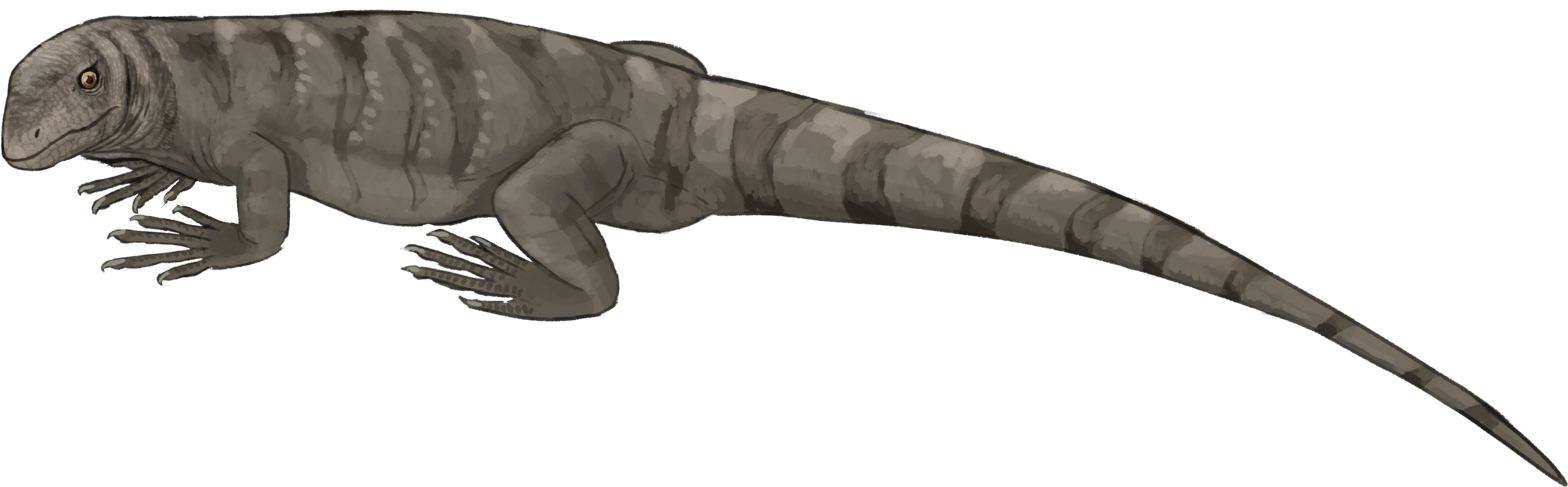

Scientific classification
- Kingdom: Animalia
- Phylum: Chordata
- Class: Reptilia
- Clade: Lepidosauromorpha
- Genus: †Vinitasaura; Sues & Kligman, 2021

Type species
- †Vinitasaura lizae Sues & Kligman, 2021

= Vinitasaura =

Vinitasaura Temporal range: Late Triassic Carnian

Extinct genus of reptiles

Vinitasaura is an extinct genus of lepidosauromorph from the Late Triassic of Virginia. It contains a single species, Vinitasaura lizae, which is based on a complete jaw and jaw fragment from the Carnian-age Vinita Formation of the Richmond Basin. Vinitasaura lived alongside several other lepidosauromorphs, including the sphenodontian Micromenodon and an undescribed pleurodont taxon. The Vinita Formation has the oldest lepidosauromorph assemblage found in North America, shedding light on the early diversification and dispersal of this reptile group.
