= Johann Christian Cuno =

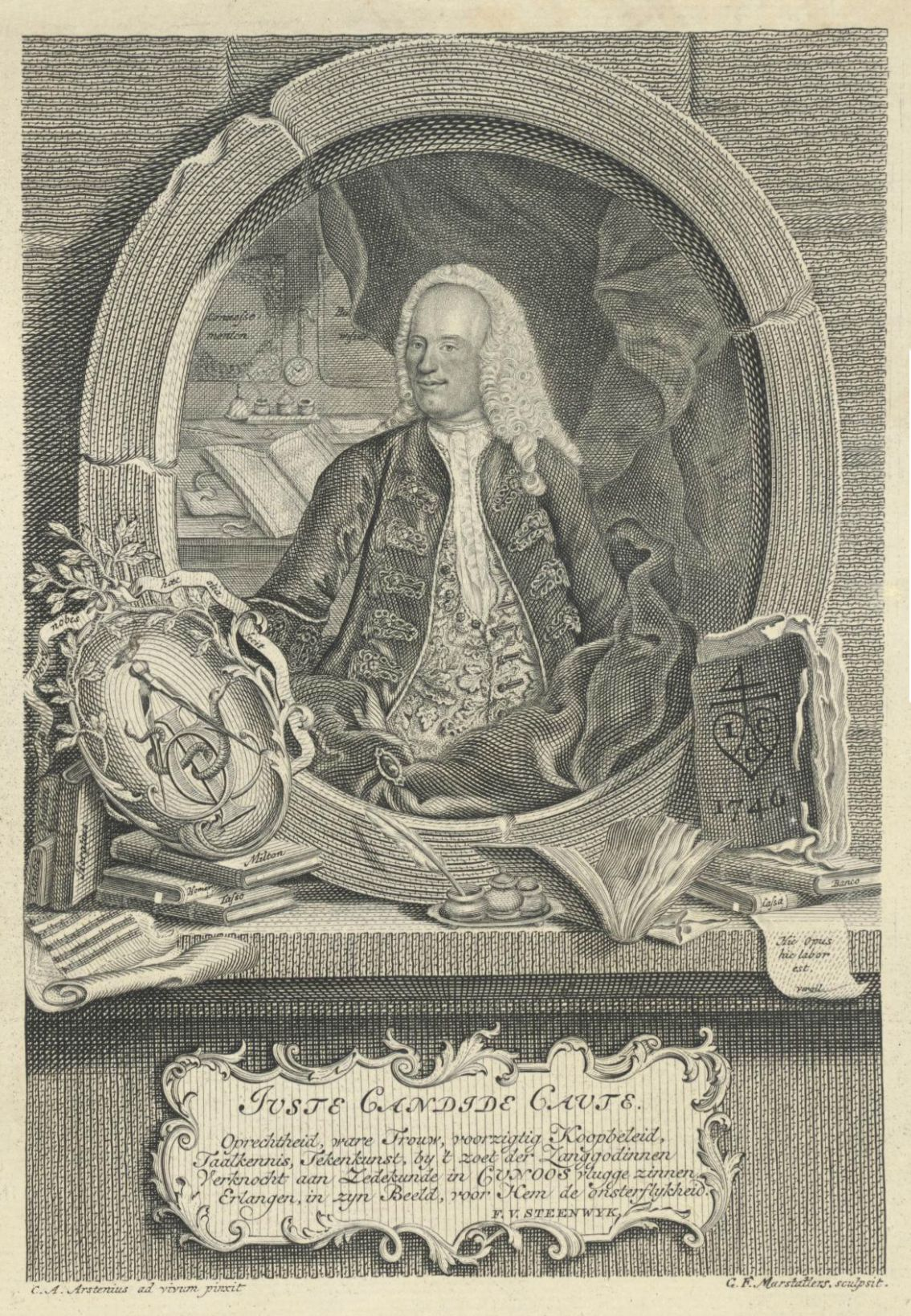
Johann Christian Cuno (1746)

Johann Christian Cuno (3 April 1708 in Berlin – 1783 in Durlach) was a German poet, writer, botanist and merchant, and was the son of a postal official in Berlin. He was also known under the names of Joan Christian Cuno, Johannes Christian Cuno and Johann Christ Cuno.

He was tutored at home, among others by the Silesian poet Johann Christian Günther. Despite wanting to enrol at Halle University, he was conscripted in 1724, but managed in 1727 to obtain Royal permission to study, not theology, as he had hoped, but law. After a year he was obliged to rejoin his regiment as a common soldier. Promoted to sergeant in 1731, he travelled to Croatia, Slavonia, Hungary and Italy as recruiting officer, taking up 10 years of his life.

During his military service he never lost his love for the sciences, but only met up with scholars again in 1740 in Rome. From Rome he went to Amsterdam, arriving destitute and facing a harsh winter. There he supported himself by proofreading for a bookseller, as well as giving lessons in languages and in music. In 1741 he made the acquaintance of and married a widow Völkers, whose husband had been a merchant. He restored the business to its former efficiency, and consequently had time to return to the sciences and his love of poetry. Cuno counted many Dutch poets amongst his friends and translated a number of their works into German or 'High Dutch' as it was then known. On a property outside Amsterdam he started a botanical garden and grew exotic plants, which were listed as a supplement by Büttner to Cuno's "Ode über seinen Garten" (1749). Cuno corresponded with Linnaeus, who honoured him by creating the plant genus Cunonia.

David Sigismundus Augustus Büttner (1724-1768), commemorated in Buettneria, was a Hungarian botanist, professor of medicine and botany at the Collegium medico-chirurgicum Berlin, and later professor of botany and zoology at the University of Göttingen.

After Cuno's wife died in 1761, he entered the service of the Dutch East India Company. One of Cuno's friends in Amsterdam was the philosopher and mystic Emanuel Swedenborg. Cuno had heard about Swedenborg and wanted to meet him, but was hesitant and doubted his respectability. Even so, Cuno wrote that he first met the Swede by chance in a bookshop toward the end of 1768. He found that Swedenborg spoke both French and German, though haltingly, and that despite his wealth he boarded with a young couple and lived a spartan life. Cuno thought of introducing him to his card-playing friends, but the Swede's strict bedtime and inability to converse in Dutch, made the idea unworkable.

Cuno finally retired to Weingarten near Durlach.

Amongst his writings that deserve mention were the poem "Versuch eines moralischen Briefes an seinen Enkel und Pflegesohn", as well as his 1762 "Messiah" in twelve cantos. Although not a great poet his works were read with pleasure, as is shown by the numerous editions published, and by his being elected a fellow of the Deutschen Gesellschaft in Göttingen.

His motto Juste, Candide, Caute (Justice, Sincerity, Caution), the Latin initials echoing his own, appears below his engraved portrait.

== Publications ==
- Aufzeichnungen Eines Amsterdamer Burgers Uber Swedenborg: Nebst Nachrichten Uber Den Verfasser (1858) - Johann Christian Cuno, Auguste Scheler
- Neue Holländische Grammatica, oder Hinlängliche (1741) - Johann Christian Cuno

== Bibliography ==
- Nederlands voor Duitsers in de achttiende eeuw Nadere gegevens over Matthias Kramer en J.C. Cuno - Jan Knol, 1982
