= Cionichthys =

Cionichthys Temporal range: Carnian–Rhaetian

Scientific classification
- Kingdom: Animalia
- Phylum: Chordata
- Class: Actinopterygii
- Order: †Redfieldiiformes
- Family: †Redfieldiidae
- Genus: †Cionichthys; Schaeffer, 1967

Species
- †C. dunklei Schaeffer, 1967; †C. greeni Schaeffer, 1967; †?C. meekeri (Schaeffer & McDonald, 1978)

Extinct genus of fishes

Cionichthys (Ancient Greek for "pillar fish", referring to Big Indian Rock, a rock formation near its type locality) is an extinct genus of freshwater ray-finned fish that inhabited southwestern and eastern North America during the Late Triassic period. It was a member of the Redfieldiiformes, an order of fishes widespread throughout freshwater habitats at this time, especially in North America.

The following species are known:

- †C. dunklei Schaeffer, 1967 - Carnian of Colorado, USA (Chinle Formation)
- †C. greeni Schaeffer, 1967 - Norian of Texas, USA (Dockum Group)
- †?C. meekeri (Schaeffer & McDonald, 1978) - Carnian of Virginia, USA (Doswell Formation) (alternatively placed in Dictyopyge)

In addition, indeterminate Cionichthys remains are known from the Carnian to the Norian of the eastern United States, in the formations of the Newark Supergroup. Specimens are known from the Doswell Formation of Virginia, the Lockatong Formation of Pennsylvania & New Jersey (previously placed in Redfieldius obrai), and the Cumnock & Cow Branch Formations of North Carolina. In the west, indeterminate remains are known from the Norian to Rhaetian-aged Chinle Formation of Arizona & Utah, while specimens tentatively assigned to C. greeni are known from the Norian-aged Redonda Formation of New Mexico.
