= Daedalichthys =

Daedalichthys Temporal range: Early Triassic (Olenekian)

Scientific classification
- Kingdom: Animalia
- Phylum: Chordata
- Class: Actinopterygii
- Order: †Redfieldiiformes
- Family: †Redfieldiidae
- Genus: †Daedalichthys; Brough, 1931
- Species: †D. formosa

Binomial name
- †Daedalichthys formosa (Broom, 1909)

Synonyms
- †Dictyopyge formosa Broom, 1909; †Daedalichthys higginsi Brough, 1931

Extinct genus of fishes

Daedalichthys is an extinct genus of prehistoric freshwater ray-finned fish that lived during the Early Triassic epoch. It contains a single species, D. formosa (=D. higginsi Warren, 1936) from the Olenekian-aged Cynognathus Assemblage Zone of South Africa. It was previously classified in Dictyopyge.

It was a member of the redfieldiiforms, a group of presumed basal neopterygians that were widespread during the Triassic.

== See also ==
- Prehistoric fish
- List of prehistoric bony fish
