= Paranaschisma =

Paranaschisma Temporal range: Late Triassic, Carnian
- Lectotype partial skull

Scientific classification
- Kingdom: Animalia
- Phylum: Chordata
- Clade: Tetrapoda
- Order: †Temnospondyli
- Suborder: †Stereospondyli
- Family: †Metoposauridae
- Genus: †Paranaschisma; Kufner, 2026
- Species: †P. howardensis

Binomial name
- †Paranaschisma howardensis (Sawin, 1944)

Extinct genus of temnospondyls

Paranaschisma ("near Anaschisma") is an extinct genus of temnospondyls. It is assigned to the family Metoposauridae, which filled the crocodile-like predatory niches in the late Triassic.

== Taxonomy ==
Paranaschisma was originally named as a new species of Buettneria, B. howardensis, by Sawin in 1944, on the basis of a number of skulls from Otis Chalk Quarry 3 in Howard County, Texas. A number of later authors variously synonymized B. howardensis with Metoposaurus fraasi or M. jonesi. Long and Murry (1995) synonymized B. howardensis with Buettneria perfecta. In 2026, howardensis was found to be distinct from Tecovaserpeton and given a new genus name, Paranaschisma.
