= Apachesaurus =

Apachesaurus Temporal range: Late Triassic
- Holotype cranium

Scientific classification
- Kingdom: Animalia
- Phylum: Chordata
- Clade: Tetrapoda
- Order: †Temnospondyli
- Suborder: †Stereospondyli
- Family: †Metoposauridae
- Genus: †Apachesaurus

Species
- †A. gregorii

Extinct genus of temnospondyls

Apachesaurus is an extinct genus of metoposaurid temnospondyls from western North America.

== Description and taxonomy ==
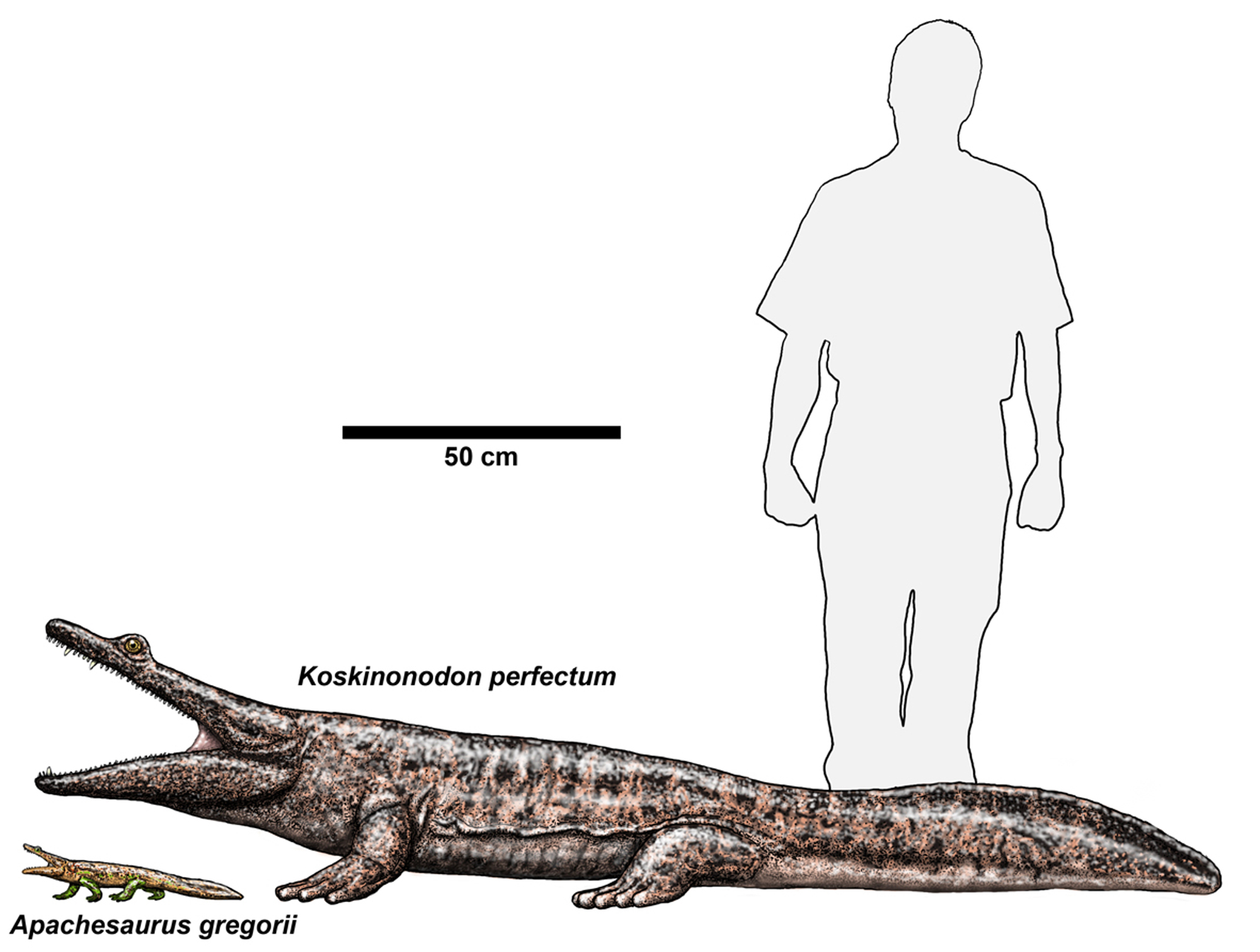
Tecovaserpeton and Apachesaurus compared to a human

Apachesaurus was described from the Upper Triassic (late Norian-Rhaetian) Redonda Formation of eastern New Mexico as a small, diminutive genus of metoposaurid. The small elongate centra were used by Hunt (1993) to consider Apachesaurus a small species of metoposaurid. However, Gee et al. (2017) and Gee and Parker (2018) demonstrated that centra referred to Apachesaurus are juveniles rather than small adults, concluding that Apachesaurus specimens are juveniles, though they cautioned they could not determine whether these are Anaschisma or a distinct taxon in its own right.
