= Pacorichthys =

Pacorichthys Temporal range: Late Ladinian, 239.51 Ma

Scientific classification
- Kingdom: Animalia
- Phylum: Chordata
- Class: Actinopterygii
- Genus: †Pacorichthys; Lombardo, 2013
- Species: †P. sangiorgii

Binomial name
- †Pacorichthys sangiorgii Lombardo, 2013

Extinct genus of fish

Pacorichthys ("Pacor fish") is an extinct genus of palaeoniscoid ray-finned fish from Switzerland. It is currently only known from the Meride Limestone, a part of the Monte San Giorgio palaeontological Lagerstatten, located in Canton Ticino. This deposit dates to the Middle Triassic, specifically the Late Ladinian. It was a small, fusiform fish similar to a large amount of other paleonisciformes though it possessed an expanded, fixed maxillary along with its suboperculum being larger than its operculum. Though not fitting with the paleoenvironments seen in the rest of the group, a Redfieldiiform affinity has been suggested for the genus. There is only a single species in the genus being P. sangiorgii.

== History and naming ==
Pacorichthys is only known from the holotype, MCSNL 5036, being a natural cast and its counterpart found at Val Mara D, a locality northwest of Meride. The studied layers of the site contain a variety of both vertebrate and invertebrate remains with some being only found at the site among the Kalkschieferzone member of the limestone. The name Pacorichthys derives from Ancient Greek and translates to "Pacor fish" in honor of the discoverer of the holotype, Enrico Pacor. The species name "sangiorgii" is a reference to where the holotype was found, being the Monte San Giorgio palaeontological Lagerstätte.

== Description ==
Pacorichthys was a small, fusiform fish with elongate jaws that had total height of 4.5 centimeters with most of the skeleton along with the scales known.

=== Skull ===
Pacorichthys had a large, smooth postrostral with a single row of pores that made up the supraorbital canal. It made contact with the ventral regions of the deep, narrow antorbitals along with its small rostral bone. that made up the front part of the orbit. These were flanked by the nasals which were long and s-shaped with pores for the infraorbital canal being present over their entire length. The parietals are barely present in the specimen though they seemed to have been triangular and would have met in the midline of the skull in a short suture. The opercular region was large and had a subtriangular shape, the suboperculum being much larger than the operculum.

The size of the expanded maxilla and narrow dentary allowed Pacorichthys to have a wide gape with very small teeth present on the both elements. Weak ridges of ganoine are present on the front of the maxilla with the tissue also being present in small patches on the post-temporals and supracleithrum. There is a notch on the bone near where the lateral line reaches the scales of the midline ridge.

=== Postcrania ===
The squamation of Pacorichthys was made up of small, thin scales rectangular and leaf-shaped that make up 36 transversal rows across the body. On the antero-lateral region, the scales possess a marked denticulation, with the rest being more simple on the other parts of the body. The scales become more homogeneous as they move down the body with the scales having denticulations only on the antero-lateral areas. Scales on the lateral line possess notches with ones towards the back of the body also having small, round openings.

Though incomplete, the pectoral fins of Pacorichthys are made up of ten rays with the first ray being behind a set of fringing fulcra. Just like the pectorals, the pelvic fins aren't completely known so the amount of rays is unknown. Both the dorsal and anal fins have a large scute in front of them along with another set of fringing fulcra. These fins are made up of 12 and 20 rays respectively. The caudal fin is made up of 30 rays that each branch at least twice and have a base longer than the distal elements. There are fringing fulcra positioned along the fish few rays along with a set of 6 strong fulcra being present on the edges of the axial body lobe.

== Classification ==
Pacorichthys shows a large amount of features characteristic of redfieldiiforms with one example being the enlarged and reduced branchiostegal elements. Even with these traits being present in the animal, the preservation of the holotype doesn't allow for a confident assignment to the group. Even with this being the case, multiple subsequent papers such as Gibson (2018) and Kim et al. (2020) refer to Pacorichthys as a member of the group.

== Paleoenvironment ==
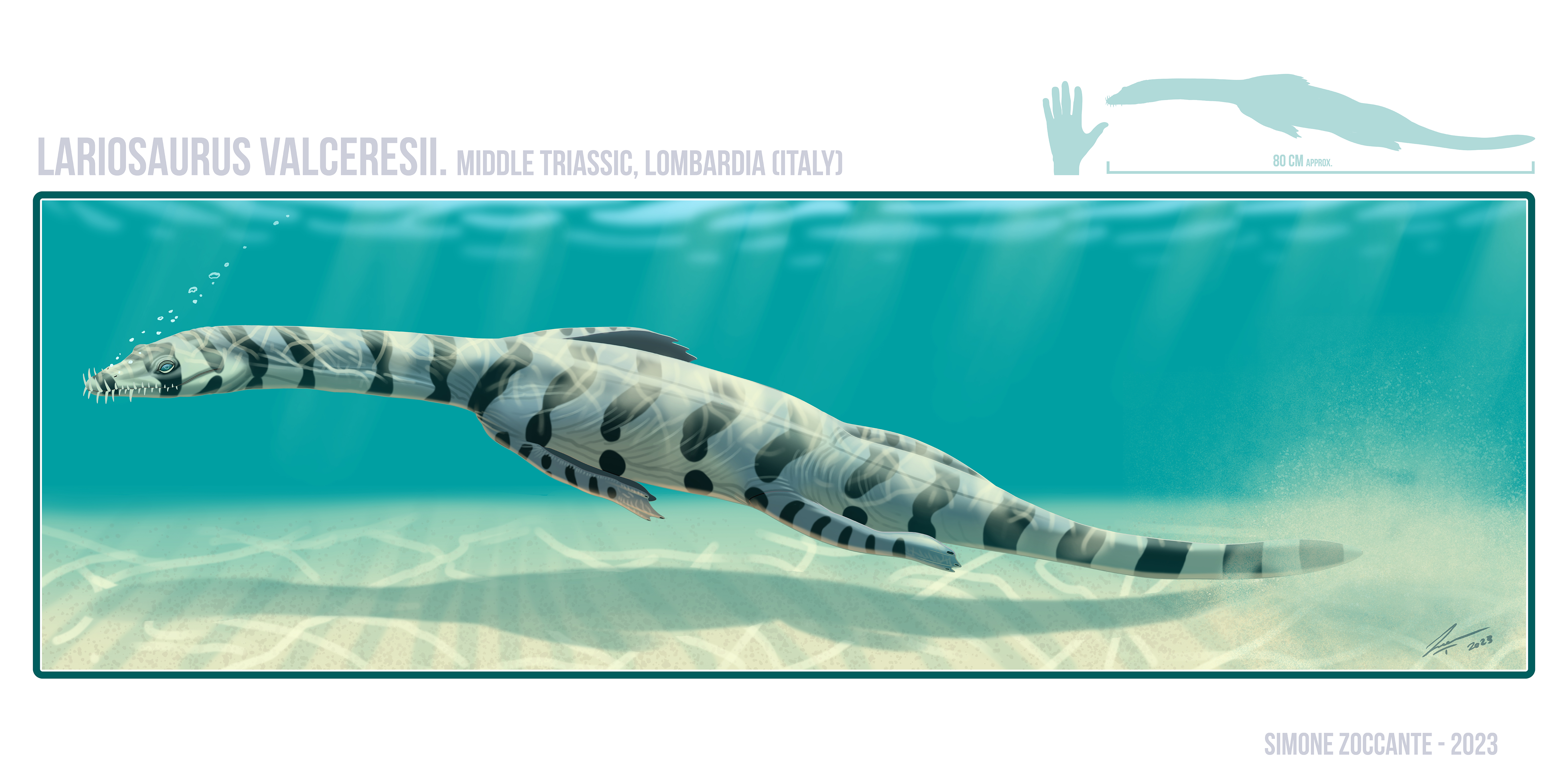
Lariosaurus valceresii, a nothosaur from the fauna

Though all other redfieldiiforms described are from freshwater environments, the Kalkschieferzone member represents a lagoon environment. It would have been positioned between the latitudes of 15° and 18° north of the equator and would have received an inflow from nearby monsoons during the wet seasons. During the dry seasons, the lagoon would have been hypersaline and would have a comparatively low water level which would have been in contrast to the brackish to freshwater conditions during the wet seasons. This has been suggested due to the presence of freshwater crustaceans that could have lived in nearby temporary lakes, only to be swept into the lagoon during floods along with the presence of clay in the strata that make up the Kalkschieferzone member. The remains of Pacorichthys was suggested to have gotten to the deposit in a similar way. This potential mix of brackish, marine and freshwater faunas contain a large amount of vertebrate fauna along with a small amount of invertebrate fauna. Some of the most notable being the nothosaur Lariosaurus and the widespread fish Saurichthys.
