= Sakamenichthys =

Sakamenichthys Temporal range: Early Triassic

Scientific classification
- Kingdom: Animalia
- Phylum: Chordata
- Class: Actinopterygii
- Order: †Redfieldiiformes
- Genus: †Sakamenichthys; Lehman, Château, Laurain et Nauche, 1959
- Species: †S. germaini

Binomial name
- †Sakamenichthys germaini Lehman, Château, Laurain et Nauche, 1959

Extinct genus of fishes

Sakamenichthys is an extinct genus of prehistoric bony fish that lived during the Early Triassic epoch in what is now Madagascar. Fossils were recovered from beds of the Middle Sakamena Formation of the Beroroha basin in the southern part of the island.

Sakamenichthys was first assigned to the family Catopteridae, but was later tentatively referred to the order Redfieldiiformes.

== See also ==
- Prehistoric fish
- List of prehistoric bony fish
