= Taylorsville Basin =

General location of the Taylorsville Basin

The Taylorsville Basin is an early Mesozoic rift basin that either outcrops, or is present beneath younger deposits, in Virginia and Maryland. It is part of the chain of rift basins along the eastern part of North America that formed during the break-up of the Pangaea supercontinent. It is filled by a fluvial and lacustrine sedimentary sequence of the Newark Supergroup.

== Extent ==
The Taylorsville Basin extends for about 175 km (109 mi) from just southeast of Richmond, Virginia to near Clinton, Maryland. At its broadest it is about 40 km (25 mi) wide. Some of its boundaries are poorly defined due to burial by younger Coastal Plain deposits.

== Stratigraphy ==
The sequence is broken down into two tectonostratigraphic intervals, thought to reflect two distinct rift phases. The lower unit is the Doswell Group, which has a more restricted extent, and comprises two formations, the South Anna Formation and the Falling Creek Formation. The upper unit, which is separated from the underlying Doswell Group by an unconformity, is the King George Group, which comprises three formations, the Newfound Formation, the Port Royal Formation and the Leedstown Formation.

== Structure ==
The Taylorsville Basin is a half-graben, with the main controlling fault forming the northwestern boundary of the basin. Subsurface data from boreholes and seismic reflection profiles, indicate that the basin was originally a series of smaller half-graben at the time of the deposition of the Doswell Group. The unconformity at the base of the overlying King George Group marks a reorganization of the rift geometry with further extension being accommodated on a single basin-bounding fault zone, giving a simple NW-thickening wedge in this upper interval. The basin was inverted during the Early Jurassic, soon after the rifting stopped, forming NE-trending folds over intrabasinal normal faults.
