= Anaschisma =

Anaschisma Temporal range: Late Triassic, Carnian–Norian
- Holotype cranium of A. browni

Scientific classification
- Kingdom: Animalia
- Phylum: Chordata
- Clade: Tetrapoda
- Order: †Temnospondyli
- Suborder: †Stereospondyli
- Family: †Metoposauridae
- Genus: †Anaschisma; Branson, 1905

Type species
- †Anaschisma browni Branson, 1905

Synonyms
- Genus synonymy: Borborophagus Branson & Mehl, 1929; Buettneria Case 1922 (preoccupied); Koskinonodon Branson & Mehl, 1929; Species synonymy: Anaschisma brachygnatha Branson, 1905; Borborophagus wyomingensis Branson & Mehl, 1929; Koskinonodon princeps Branson & Mehl, 1929

Extinct genus of temnospondyls

Anaschisma ("ripped up") is an extinct genus of large temnospondyls. These animals were part of the family called Metoposauridae, which filled the crocodile-like predatory niches in the late Triassic. It had a large skull about 62 centimetres (24 in) long, and possibly reached 3 metres (9.8 ft) long. It was an ambush hunter, snapping up anything small enough to fit in its huge jaws. It was very common during the Late Triassic (Carnian-Norian age) in what is now the American Southwest.

== History of discovery ==
Holotype cranium of “A. brachygnatha”, now a synonym of A. browni

Anaschisma was erected by Branson (1905) from two metoposaurid skulls from the Popo Agie Formation (Carnian) of Wyoming. The generic name Anaschisma ("ripped up") was not explained but would derive from Ancient Greek ἀνασχίζω [anaskhizo] "rip up, rend", likely alluding to the fragmented state of the original fossils noted by Branson: "The skulls were incased in a hard matrix of arenaceous shale, and had been broken in many pieces." The type species, A. browni, was coined for the skull UC 447, while a second nominal species, A. brachygnatha, was erected for the skull UC 448. Moodie (1908) considered A. brachygnatha a junior synonym of A. browni, although Branson and Mehl (1929) retained the two species as distinct. Colbert and Imbrie (1956) synonymized Anaschisma with the Newark Supergroup genus Eupelor but retained it as a valid Eupelor species endemic to the Popo Agie Formation. Chowdhury (1965) synonymized Anaschisma with Metoposaurus and sunk all North American metoposaurids from the Chinle and Dockum into browni.

Hunt (1989) recovered Anaschisma as an advanced or highly derived form. Some specimens attributed to Anaschisma from the Redonda Formation were renamed Apachesaurus by Hunt (1993).

=== Koskinonodon ===
Geographic and stratigraphic distribution of metoposaurids in North America; D is . browni, E-G are junior synonyms

The genus Koskinonodon was formerly named Buettneria by Case in 1922, but in 2007, B.D. Mueller realized that the name Buettneria had already been given to a bush cricket from the Republic of Congo by Karsch (1889), so he made the genus Koskinonodon the earliest available unpreoccupied name for the temnospondyl. Lucas et al. (2007), however, petitioned the ICZN to suppress Karsch's name in favor of Case's name, citing evidence that the amphibian name is much more well known and widely used (the authors cited 75 uses of the name in scientific literature and books over the last 85 years), and that the bush cricket name had been seldom used in technical literature. However, ICZN Opinion 2255 issued in 2010 rejected the petition.

Known Koskinonodon fossils have been found in the United States, especially the Chinle Formation of Petrified Forest National Park and the Placerias Quarry in Arizona, the Garita Creek Formation of central New Mexico (the quarry at Lamy), the Petrified Forest Member of northern New Mexico, the Bluewater Creek Formation of western New Mexico, the New Oxford Formation of Pennsylvania, the Tecovas Formation of western Texas, and the Popo Agie Formation of the Chugwater Group of Wyoming.

Synonymy of Koskinonodon with Anaschisma started when Romer (1947) proposed that Anaschisma was a senior synonym of Buettneria, Koskinonodon, and Borborophagus. This was followed by Gee et al. (2019), where they redescribed the holotypes of the two nominal Anaschisma species, and then synonymized Koskinonodon, Buettneria and Borborophagus with Anaschisma. The species B. bakeri which has long been assigned to the various synonyms of Anaschisma, was moved to its own genus, Buettnererpeton, in 2022.

== Description ==
Holotype skull in side view

The skull of Anaschisma differs from the skulls of other closely related organisms in a few key ways. It is wider overall and features eye sockets that are very anterior and forward oriented, more so than its contemporaries. Also, the skull has prominent slime canals, which are used for transporting mucus, as well as large external nares. In addition, the upper jaw is relatively weak and thin, used only for holding teeth. Their large jaws could have held many teeth at once, maybe even over 100 on each side of the upper and lower jaws, but the actual number varies constantly over the animal's lifetime due to natural causes such as fighting, eating, disease, etc. The sheer size of the skull is one of the most defining traits for the genus Anaschisma.

Other more minor skull traits characterize Anaschisma as well: elongation of the lacrimal, shortening of the prefrontal, reduction of the interclavicle, and the most characteristic is the center lachrymal entering margin of the orbit. While the shortened prefrontal is a characteristic of the family Metoposauridae, it is shorted even more in Anaschisma. The interclavicle is reduced in the way that it has many hexagonal pits as well as grooves and ridges. The skull of Anaschisma is also covered in this reticulate ornamentation. Some researchers believe that Anaschisma has a shorter posterior process of the interclavicle, which may discriminate it from other closely related species, while others believe that there is not enough information to make that distinction. Anaschisma also has ossified opisthotics, the more posterior of the bones surrounding the inner ear.

Anaschisma had sharp, pointy teeth for catching and killing prey. They had marginal teeth as well as larger teeth on the palate, specifically palatine and ectopterygoid teeth. They had two basic types: large with shallow grooves and small with deeper grooves. These grooves run lengthwise down the teeth and aided the animals in catching prey. The teeth are elongated labio-lingually at their base and opposite, mesiodistally, at their tip. In the middle, they are not elongated either way but instead circular. These dental adaptations enhanced the ability of Anaschisma to capture prey; the teeth are optimized for piercing prey and not allowing it to escape, resisting the bending force applied by the struggling organism, and propagating cracks in the hard parts of the object, such as bone, allowing for easier eating and digestion.

Anaschisma had a wide, wedge-shaped, powerful tail to assist it with swimming, hunting and likely defense. It was not long like the crocodiles of today, but more likely short and strong to enable it to quickly spring up from hiding and capture prey before it escapes. The legs of Anaschisma display a sprawling stance and short legs with 4-digits on the front and 5 on the back limbs. Anaschisma likely spent a lot of time motionless, waiting for prey, which these short legs were likely an adaptation to.

== Paleobiology ==
Holotype cranium of “Koskinonodon princeps”, a synonym of A. browni

The hunting style of Anaschisma involved lying at the bottom of a shallow swamp, waiting for a fish, crustacean, smaller amphibian, or even a young phytosaur to wander by. When it spotted prey, it used its huge jaws to engulf and consume them. A few particular adaptations suggest Koskinonodon had this aquatic lifestyle. First, they had lateral lines formed by the sensory sulci. These are useful for detecting changes in water pressure made by the swimming motions of nearby organisms. Their sprawling limbs were also adapted for water. They would not move quickly or efficiently on land, although they may have done it to find another water pool with more food or other resource. Mass graves have been found, thought to be a result of a group of these animals gathering together in a withering water pool during a drought and all perishing because the water was never replenished.

== Paleoecology ==
They lived mostly in the late Triassic; by the time the Jurassic began, most temnospondyls, Anaschisma included, were gone. It is likely that they went extinct during the Triassic-Jurassic extinction event, along with the majority of other large amphibians, the class of Conodonts and 34% of all marine genera. It is unknown what caused this mass extinction; hypotheses include huge volcanic eruptions (the Central Atlantic magmatic province is a prime example), climate change, oceanic acidification, or an asteroid impact. It is known, however, that over half of the species living on Earth at that time went extinct from this event. It lived alongside many other smaller amphibians, and its fossils are also commonly found with phytosaur fossils. It was named in 1931 by Case. The best conditions for fossilization occur in river valleys or floodplains where deposition is occurring, and this animal likely lived in similar shallow, swampy habitats. As it follows, Anaschisma is famous for having extremely well preserved fossils, and they are often found in groups.

== See also ==
- Prehistoric amphibian
- List of prehistoric amphibians
