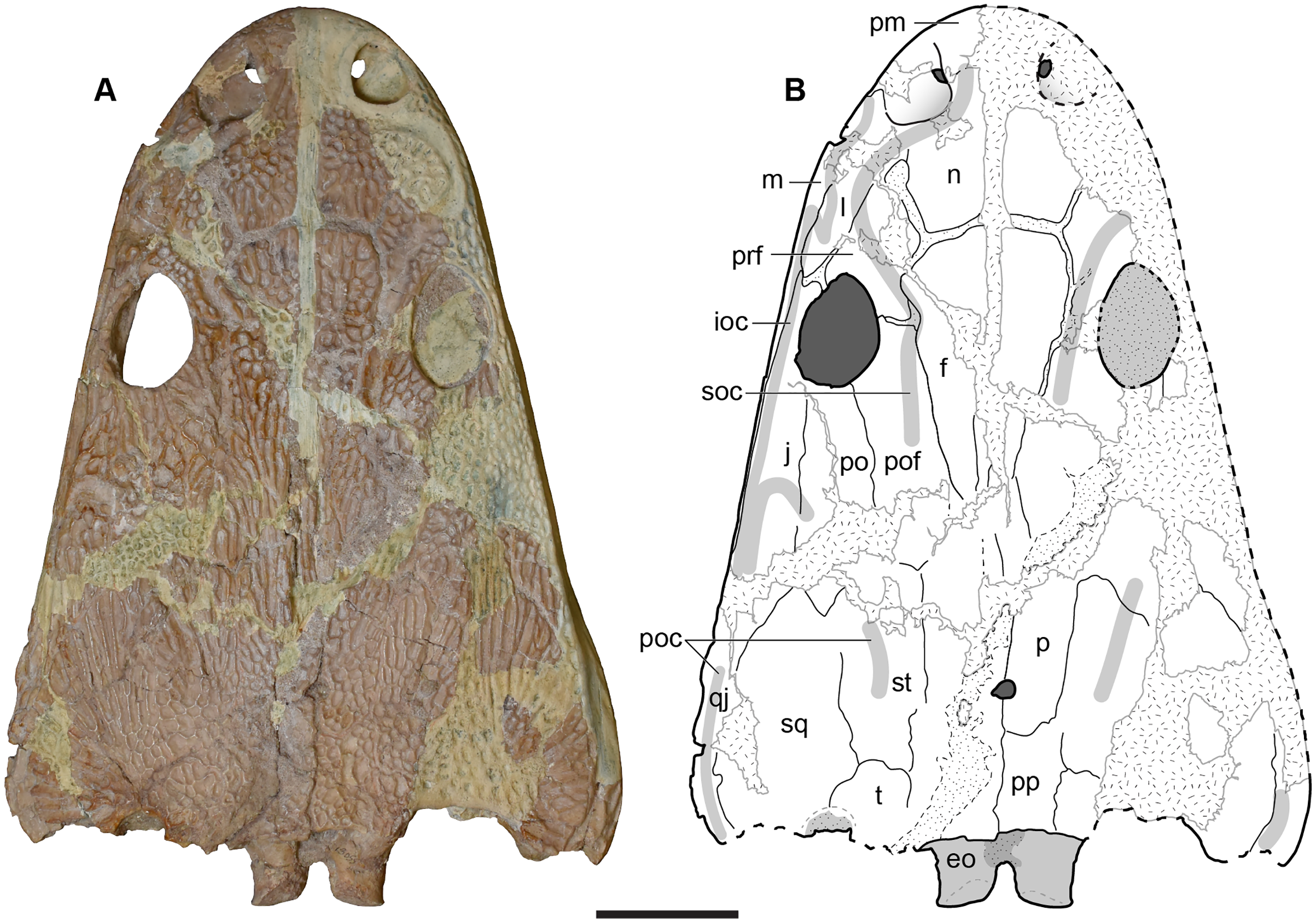
- Holotype skull
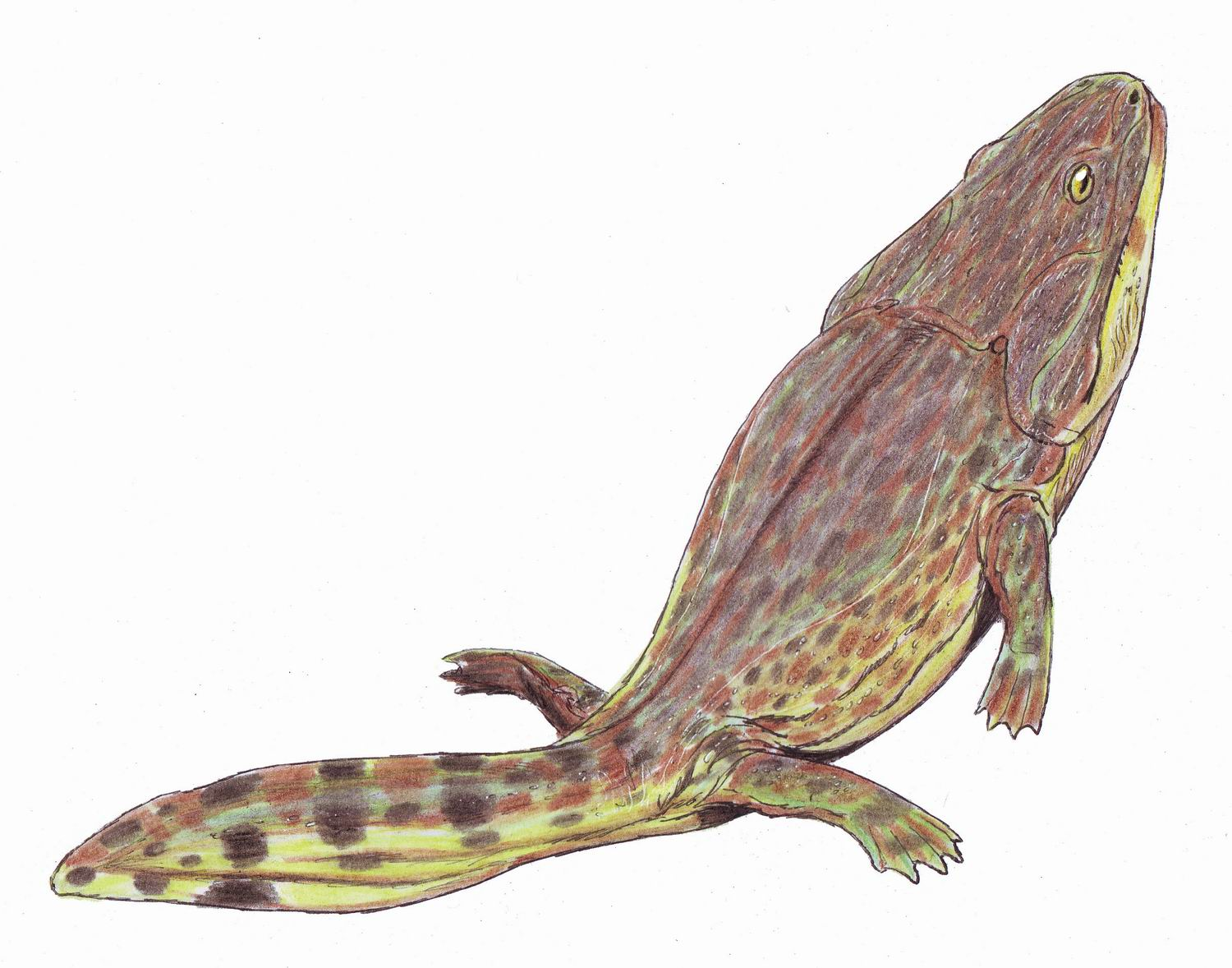
- Life restoration

Scientific classification
- Kingdom: Animalia
- Phylum: Chordata
- Clade: Tetrapoda
- Order: †Temnospondyli
- Suborder: †Stereospondyli
- Family: †Metoposauridae
- Genus: †Buettnererpeton; Gee & Kufner, 2022

Type species
- †Buettnererpeton bakeri Case, 1931

Synonyms
- List: Buettneria bakeri Case, 1931; Metoposaurus bakeri Hunt, 1993; Koskinonodon bakeri Brusatte et al., 2015

= Buettnererpeton =

Buettnererpeton Temporal range: Late Triassic

Extinct genus of temnospondyls

Buettnererpeton is an extinct genus of large temnospondyls known from the Late Triassic Dockum Group in Texas. The type species, B. bakeri, was long classified as part of other genera, such as Metoposaurus and Koskinonodon, but was placed in its own genus in 2022.
