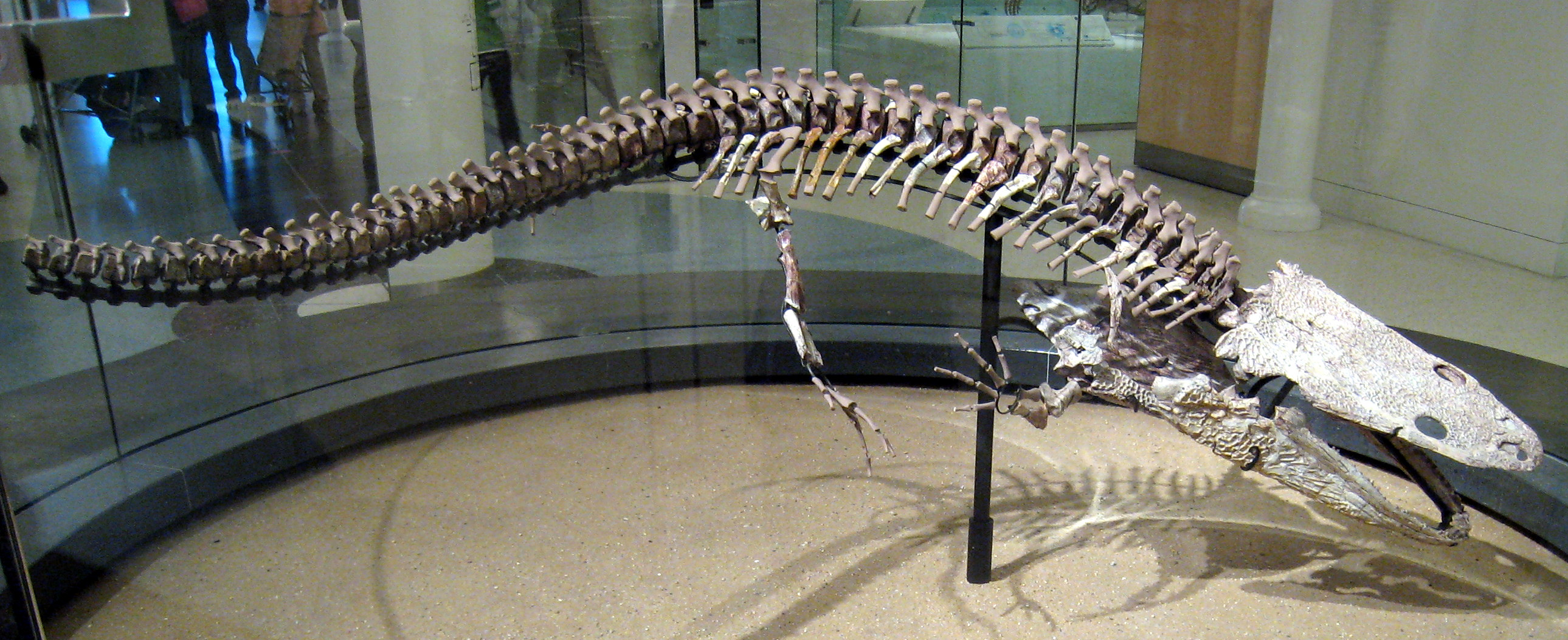
- Skeleton of Tecovaserpeton at the AMNH

Scientific classification
- Kingdom: Animalia
- Phylum: Chordata
- Clade: Tetrapoda
- Order: †Temnospondyli
- Suborder: †Stereospondyli
- Family: †Metoposauridae
- Genus: †Tecovaserpeton; Kufner, 2026

Type species
- †Tecovaserpeton perfectum Case, 1922

Synonyms
- Genus synonymy: Buettneria Case 1922 (preoccupied); Species synonymy: Buettneria perfecta Case, 1922; Koskinonodon perfectus (Case, 1922)

= Tecovaserpeton =

Tecovaserpeton Temporal range: Late Triassic, Carnian–Norian

Extinct genus of temnospondyls

Tecovaserpeton ("creeping thing from the Tecovas Formation") is an extinct genus of large temnospondyls. These animals were part of the family called Metoposauridae, which filled the crocodile-like predatory niches in the late Triassic. It had a large skull about 62 centimetres (24 in) long, and possibly reached 3 metres (9.8 ft) long. It was an ambush hunter, snapping up anything small enough to fit in its huge jaws. It was very common during the Late Triassic (Carnian-Norian age) in what is now the American Southwest.

== History of discovery ==
Holotype skull

The species Tecovaserpeton perfectum was originally named Buettneria perfecta by Ermin Cowles Case in 1922 on the basis of UMMP 7475, a skull from the Tecovas Formation of the Sand Creek breaks in Crosby County, Texas. However, in 2007, B.D. Mueller realized that the name Buettneria had already been given to a bush cricket from the Republic of Congo by Karsch (1889), so he made the genus Koskinonodon the earliest available unpreoccupied name for the temnospondyl. Lucas et al. (2007), however, petitioned the ICZN to suppress Karsch's name in favor of Case's name, citing evidence that the amphibian name is much more well known and widely used (the authors cited 75 uses of the name in scientific literature and books over the last 85 years), and that the bush cricket name had been seldom used in technical literature. However, ICZN Opinion 2255 issued in 2010 rejected the petition. Kufner (2026) coined Tecovaserpeton as a replacement name for Buettneria.

== See also ==
- Prehistoric amphibian
- List of prehistoric amphibians
