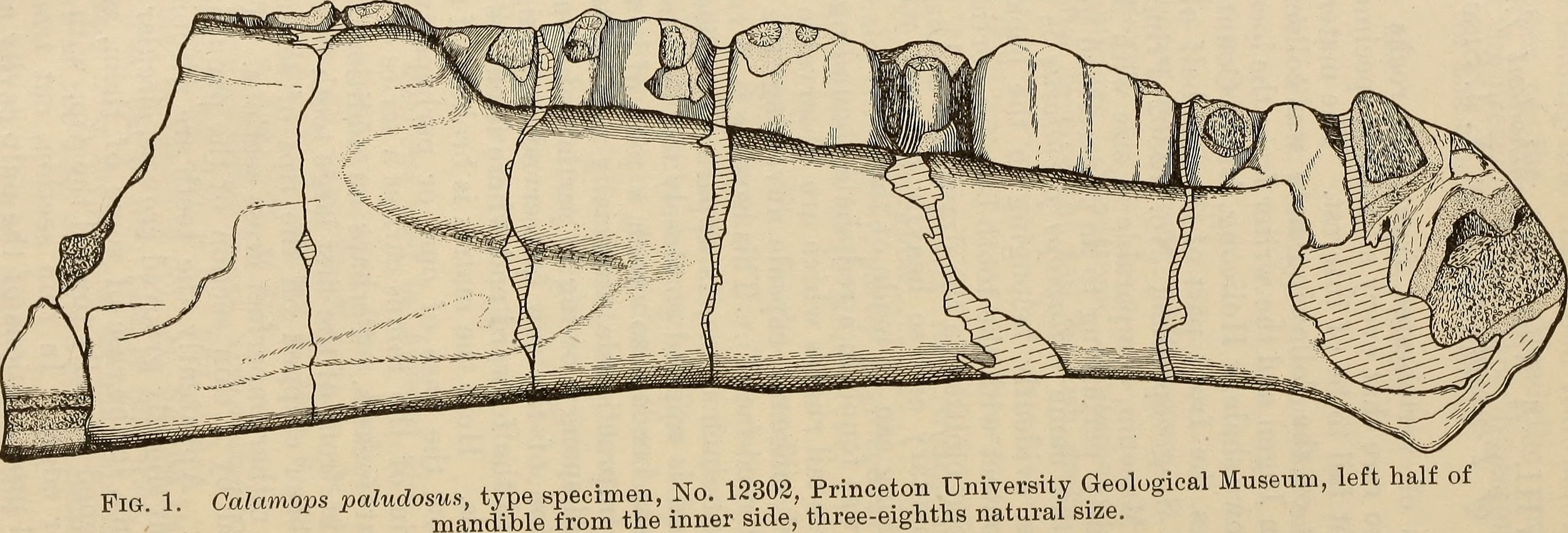
- Type mandible

Scientific classification
- Domain: Eukaryota
- Kingdom: Animalia
- Phylum: Chordata
- Order: †Temnospondyli
- Suborder: †Stereospondyli
- Superfamily: †Trematosauroidea
- Genus: †Calamops; Sinclair, 1917

Type species
- †Calamops paludosus Sinclair, 1917

= Calamops =

Calamops Temporal range: Late Triassic, 221.5–205.6 Ma

Extinct genus of amphibians

Calamops is an extinct genus of large temnospondyl amphibian known from the base of the Solebury Member of the Late Triassic Newark Supergroup of Pennsylvania, United States. Calamops was first named by Sinclair in 1917 and the type species is Calamops paludosus. It was usually thought to be a metoposaurid of questionable validity as its holotype and only known specimen, which comprises three pieces of a left mandibular ramus, had never been prepared. Following a preparation and casting of the specimen, Hans-Dieter Sues and Rainer R. Schoch found in 2013 Calamops to represent a valid taxon of trematosauroid temnospondyls that can be diagnosed by several autapomorphies. It represents one of the geologically youngest known long-snouted trematosaurs and the first record of these temnospondyls from the Late Triassic of North America. It is also the oldest known tetrapod fossil from the Triassic of the Newark basin.
