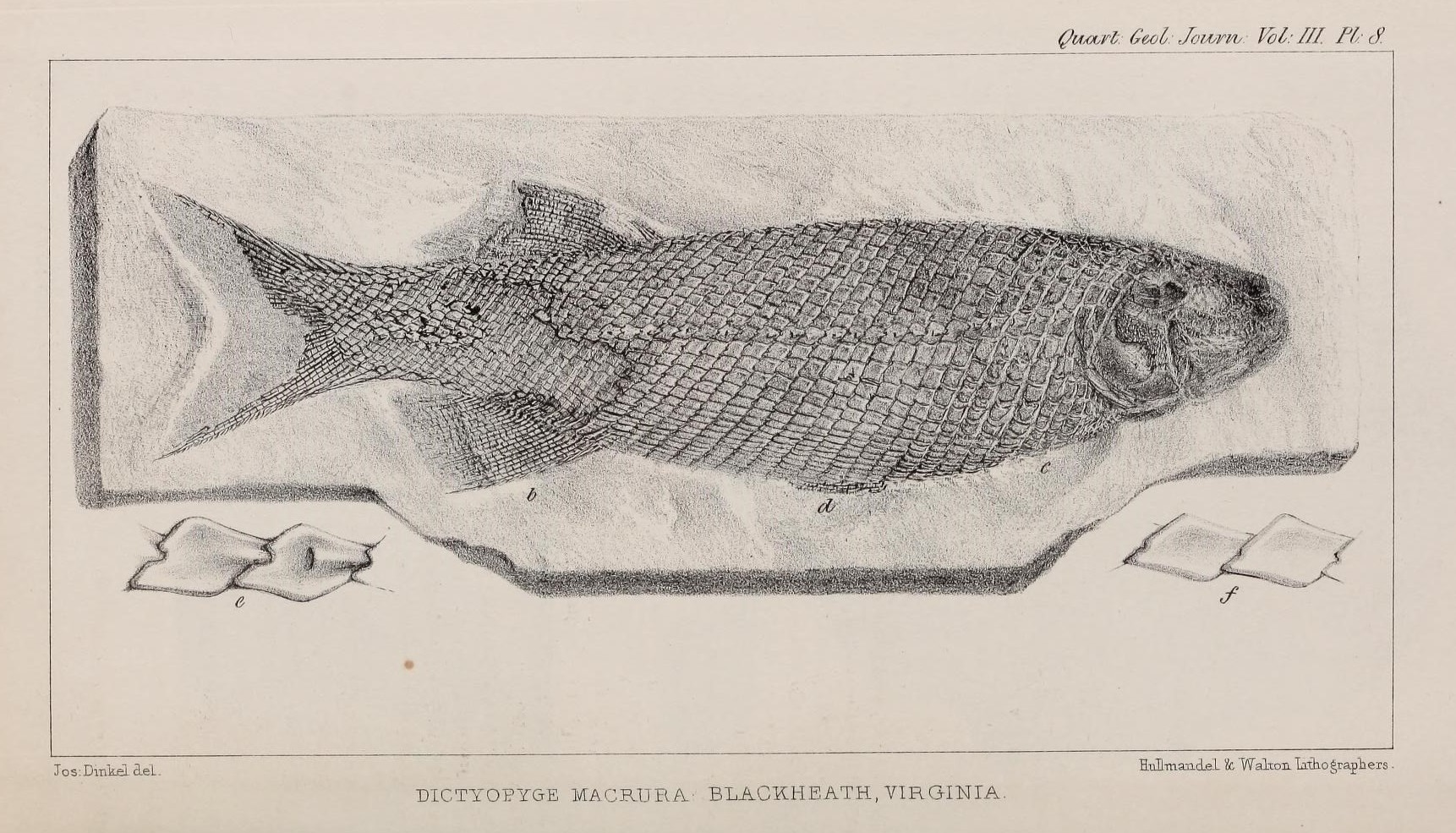
- Dictyopyge macrurus from the Late Triassic of Virginia

Scientific classification
- Kingdom: Animalia
- Phylum: Chordata
- Class: Actinopterygii
- Subclass: Neopterygii (?)
- Order: †Redfieldiiformes; Berg, 1940

Type genus
- †Redfieldius Hay, 1899

Families
- Brookvaliidae; Redfieldiidae

= Redfieldiiformes =

Redfieldiiformes Temporal range: Induan–Sinemurian

Extinct order of ray-finned fishes

Redfieldiiformes is an extinct order of ray-finned fish (actinopterygians) which lived from the Early Triassic to Early Jurassic. Redfieldiiforms were fairly typical Triassic fish in overall anatomy. They had a fusiform (streamlined, tuna-like) body shape with thick, ganoine-covered scales. The dorsal and anal fins were large, positioned opposite from each other, and shifted back, close to the tail. The caudal fin was hemiheterocercal, with the vertebral column and body scales extending into an upper lobe equal in size and shape to the lower lobe. They also had several characteristic skeletal traits, such as a hatchet-shaped preopercle, a series of fulcra (thin spiny scales) fringing the fins, a reduced number of branchiostegal rays (typically just one), and a snout ornamented with tubercles.

The maxilla has small teeth and is strongly connected to the preopercle; this would have allowed a deep gape to assist in ram feeding. The function of the snout tubercles is uncertain; some authors have suggested that they attached to a fleshy upper lip, while others argue that they could have held sensory organs akin to the tubercles of siluriforms (catfish).

Redfieldiiforms were fairly primitive 'subholostean' fish (more primitive than holosteans such as gars or the bowfin), with uncertain relations to neopterygians. Some studies draw comparisons to 'perleidiforms' or ptycholepids, while others consider redfieldiiforms to be early neopterygians related to pholidopleuriforms. Redfieldiiforms were exclusively freshwater fish which became prominent in southern Gondwana (Argentina, Australia, southern Africa) during the Middle Triassic. By the Late Triassic they had become a major component of freshwater ecosystems in western Laurasia (North America and Morocco). However, they were much rarer further east (South Korea, possibly Switzerland). The last member of the order, Redfieldius, lived in the Early Jurassic of eastern North America.

== Taxonomy ==
The following families and genera are known:

- Order Redfieldiiformes
  - Genus Calaichthys
  - Genus Denwoodichthys?
  - Genus Helichthys
  - Genus Hiascoactinus
  - Genus Pacorichthys?
  - Genus Sakamenichthys?
  - Genus Sinkiangichthys (nomen dubium)?
  - Family Brookvaliidae
    - Genus Atopocephala
    - Genus Brookvalia
    - Genus Ischnolepis
    - Genus Phlyctaenichthys
    - Genus Schizurichthys (formerly placed in the family Schizurichthyidae)
  - Family Redfieldiidae
    - Genus Cionichthys
    - Genus Endemichthys?
    - Genus Daedalichthys
    - Genus Dictyopyge
    - Genus Geitonichthys
    - Genus Lasalichthys (=Synorichthys)
    - Genus Mauritanichthys
    - Genus Molybdichthys
    - Genus Redfieldius
