= Micromenodon =

Micromenodon Temporal range: Late Triassic, Carnian

Scientific classification
- Domain: Eukaryota
- Kingdom: Animalia
- Phylum: Chordata
- Class: Reptilia
- Order: Rhynchocephalia
- Suborder: Sphenodontia
- Genus: †Micromenodon; Sues & Schoch, 2021

Type species
- †Micromenodon pitti Sues & Schoch, 2021

Extinct genus of reptiles

Micromenodon is an extinct genus of sphenodontian from the Late Triassic Doswell Formation of Virginia. It contains a single species, Micromenodon pitti. The species is only known from a partial maxilla with teeth. It has been placed as a basal member of Sphenodontia.

- Rhynchocephalia
  - Gephyrosaurus
  - - Diphydontosaurus
    - - Micromenodon
      - - Planocephalosaurus
        - - Rebbanasaurus
          - - Sphenocondor
            - Godavarisaurus
        - - Polysphenodon
          - - Clevosaurus+Brachyrhinodon
            - Neosphenodontia
