= Helichthys =

Helichthys Temporal range: Early Triassic

Scientific classification
- Kingdom: Animalia
- Phylum: Chordata
- Class: Actinopterygii
- Order: †Redfieldiiformes
- Family: †Redfieldiidae
- Genus: †Helichthys; Broom, 1909
- Species: †H. browni

Binomial name
- †Helichthys browni Broom, 1909

Extinct genus of fishes

Helichthys is an extinct genus of prehistoric freshwater ray-finned fish that lived during the Early Triassic epoch in what is now South Africa.

Although several species of Helichthys have been erected (H. elegans, H. stegopyge, H. obesus, H. ctenipteryx, H. grandipennis), they were later all synonymized with the type species, H. browni. Fossils were recovered from the Olenekian-aged Lower Cynognathus Assemblage Zone of Bekker's Kraal.

== Synonyms ==
- Helichthys draperi (Woodward, 1893) → Dicellopyge draperi (Woodward, 1893)
- Helichthys tenuis Broom, 1909 → Dicellopyge tenuis (Broom, 1909)

== See also ==
- Prehistoric fish
- List of prehistoric bony fish
