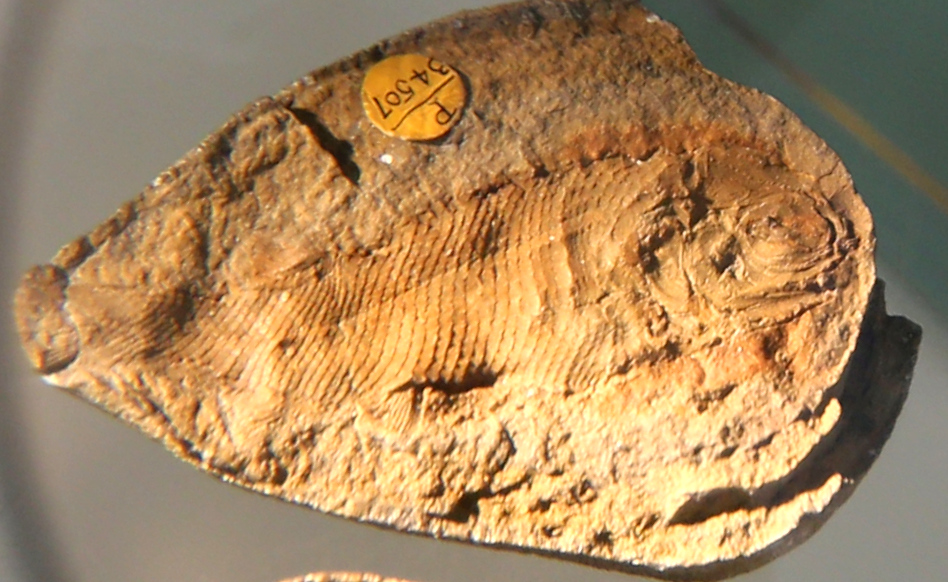
- C. budensis fossil

Scientific classification
- Kingdom: Animalia
- Phylum: Chordata
- Class: Actinopterygii
- Family: †Cornuboniscidae; White, 1939
- Genus: †Cornuboniscus; White, 1939
- Species: †C. budensis

Binomial name
- †Cornuboniscus budensis White, 1939

= Cornuboniscus =

Cornuboniscus Temporal range: Bashkirian

Extinct genus of ray-finned fishes

Cornuboniscus is an extinct genus of freshwater ray-finned fish that lived during the Pennsylvanian epoch (Carboniferous), and the only member of the family Cornuboniscidae. It contains a single species, C. budensis from the Bashkirian/lower Westphalian-aged Culm Measures of what is now Cornwall, England. The genus Cornubonisus was named after the island of Cornubian, and the species name refers to the coastal town of Bude in Cornwall. The type specimen is held in the town's Castle Heritage Centre.

It was initially described as a palaeonisciform, a group of early ray-finned fishes that is now considered to be paraphyletic. On the basis of its paddle-like pectoral fins, it was initially recovered as a descendant of an early group of palaeonisciformes that also gave rise to the Tarrasiiformes and the extant bichirs. A later study instead found it as potentially being sister to the amblypterids and Acrolepis.

Cornuboniscus was a small, sardine-sized fish with an array of razor-sharp teeth likely used to prey on small crustaceans. It inhabited and was likely endemic to Lake Bude, a large, tropical, equatorial lake formed during the Variscan orogeny.
