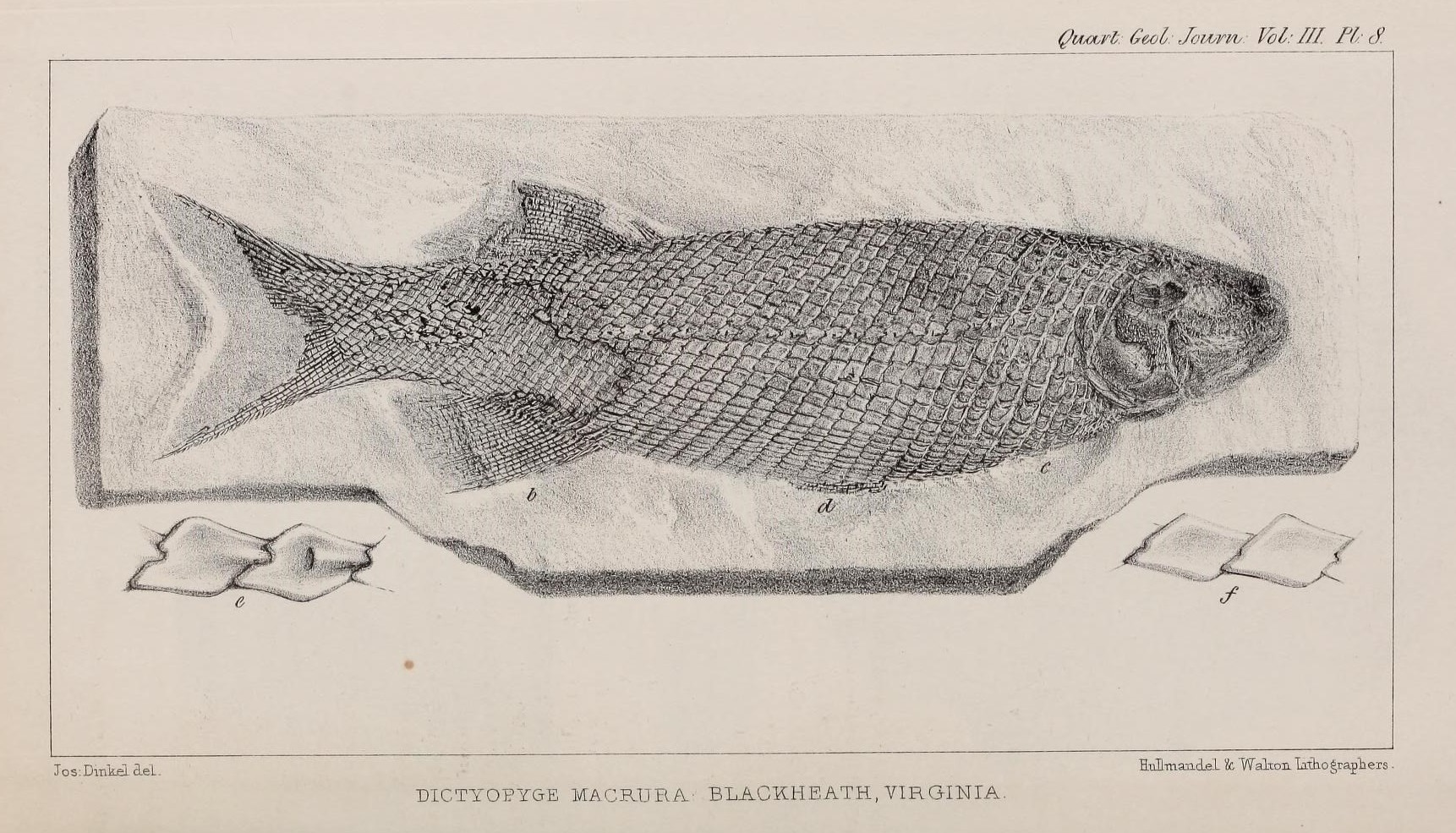
- Specimen of D. macrura

Scientific classification
- Kingdom: Animalia
- Phylum: Chordata
- Class: Actinopterygii
- Order: †Redfieldiiformes
- Family: †Redfieldiidae
- Genus: †Dictyopyge; Egerton, 1847

Species
- Dictyopyge macrurus Redfield, 1841; Dictyopyge meekeri Schaeffer and McDonald, 1978

Synonyms
- Dictopyge; Dictyopype

= Dictyopyge =

Dictyopyge Temporal range: Early Carnian

Extinct genus of fishes

Dictyopyge is an extinct genus of prehistoric freshwater ray-finned fish that inhabited eastern North America during the early part of the Late Triassic. Two species are recognized, both from the early Carnian-aged Doswell Formation in what is now Virginia, United States:

- †D. macrura (Redfield, 1841) - Carnian of Virginia
- †D. meekeri Schafer & McDonald, 1978 - Carnian of Virginia

Both species inhabited the rift lakes of the Newark Supergroup, which formed due to the tectonic changes that were starting to break up Pangaea.

Several possibly unrelated species from the Triassic of Europe are provisionally referred to Dictyopyge ("D." rhenana, "D." socialis, "D." catoptera, "D." superstes), while three species from the Middle Triassic of Australia previously referred to Dictyopyge have been tentatively reallocated to the genus Brookvalia.

== See also ==
- Prehistoric fish
- List of prehistoric bony fish
