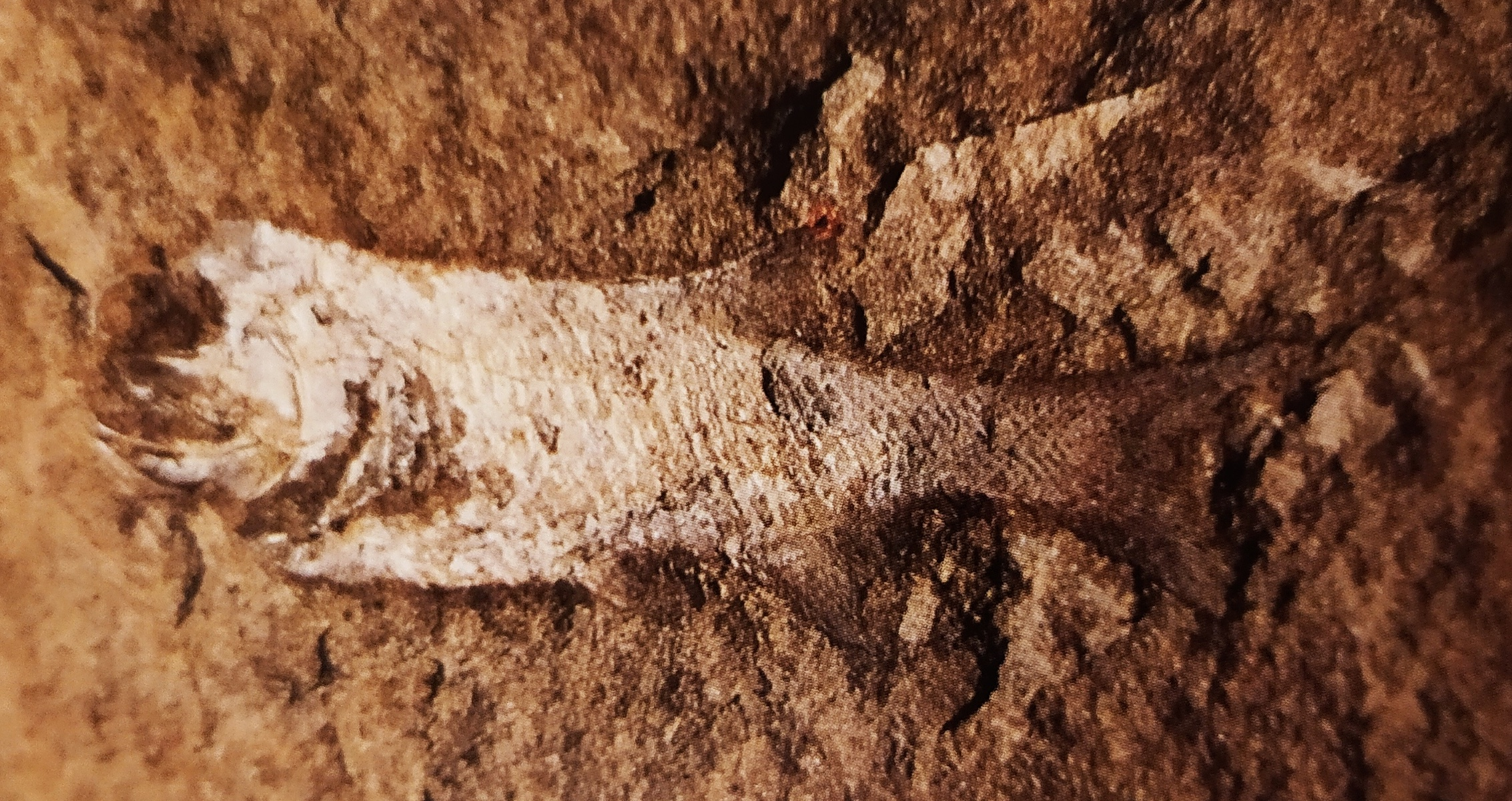
- Specimen of A. watsoni

Scientific classification
- Kingdom: Animalia
- Phylum: Chordata
- Class: Actinopterygii
- Order: †Redfieldiiformes
- Family: †Brookvaliidae
- Genus: †Atopocephala; Brough, 1934
- Species: †A. watsoni

Binomial name
- †Atopocephala watsoni Brough, 1934

= Atopocephala =

Atopocephala Temporal range: Anisian

Extinct genus of fishes

Atopocephala is an extinct genus of prehistoric freshwater ray-finned fish that lived during the Middle Triassic epoch. It contains a single species, A. watsoni from the Karoo Supergroup of South Africa. A potential indeterminate species was known from the Timezgadiouine Formation of Morocco, but is now considered an indeterminate actinopterygian.

== See also ==
- Prehistoric fish
- List of prehistoric bony fish
