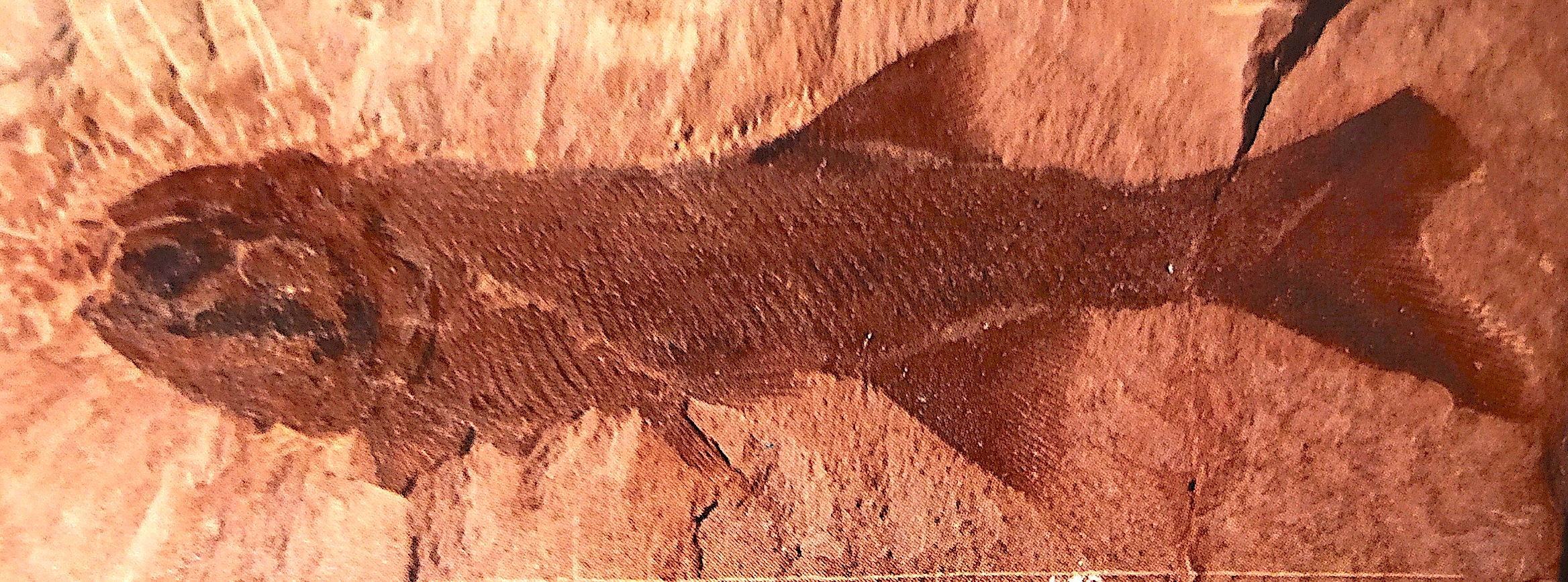
- Specimen of B. gracilis

Scientific classification
- Kingdom: Animalia
- Phylum: Chordata
- Class: Actinopterygii
- Order: †Redfieldiiformes
- Family: †Brookvaliidae
- Genus: †Brookvalia; Wade, 1933

Synonyms
- Beaconia Wade, 1935; Dictyopleurichthys Wade, 1935

= Brookvalia =

Brookvalia Temporal range: Middle Triassic

Extinct genus of fishes

Brookvalia is an extinct genus of prehistoric freshwater ray-finned fish that lived during the Middle Triassic epoch (Anisian stage).

It contains four species, all known from the Hawkesbury Sandstone near Brookvale, New South Wales, Australia.

- †B. gracilis Wade, 1933 (=B. parvisquamata Wade, 1933)
- †B. latipennis (Wade, 1935) (=Dictyopleurichthys latipennis Wade, 1935)
- †B. propennis Wade, 1933
- †B. spinosa (Wade, 1935) (=Beaconia spinosa Wade, 1935)

It was a member of the redfieldiiforms, a group of presumed basal neopterygians that were widespread during the Triassic.

== See also ==
- Prehistoric fish
- List of prehistoric bony fish
