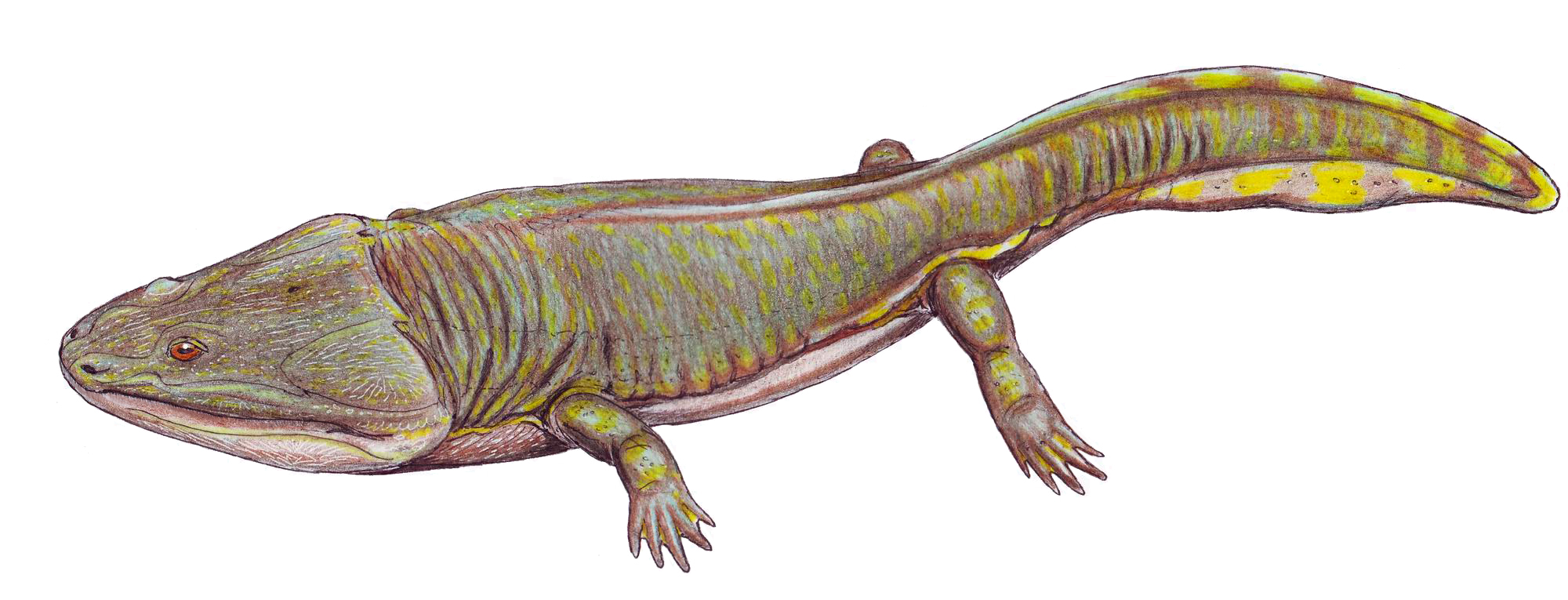
- Metoposaurus

Scientific classification
- Kingdom: Animalia
- Phylum: Chordata
- Clade: Tetrapoda
- Order: †Temnospondyli
- Suborder: †Stereospondyli
- Superfamily: †Metoposauroidea
- Family: †Metoposauridae; Watson, 1919

Genera
- †Anaschisma; †Apachesaurus; †Arganasaurus; †Buettnererpeton; †Dutuitosaurus; †Metoposaurus; †Panthasaurus; †Paranaschisma; †Tecovaserpeton

= Metoposauridae =

Metoposaurids

Extinct family of temnospondyls

Metoposauridae is an extinct family of trematosaurian temnospondyls. The family is known from the Late Triassic period. Most members are large, approximately 1.5 metres (4.9 ft) long and could reach 3 m long. Metoposaurids can be distinguished from most other stereospondyls by the position of their eyes, placed far forward on the snout (the type genus, Metoposaurus, means 'front lizard').

== Geographic distribution ==
Metoposaurids had a wide distribution across Pangea, being known from across the continental United States and Nova Scotia in North America; France, Germany, Italy, Poland, and Portugal in western Europe; India; Morocco; and Madagascar. Material has also been reported from Zimbabwe but was not collected. At least some historic reports of metoposaurid material are likely undiagnostic below Stereospondyli or are referable to other clades.

== History of study ==
Metoposaurids were one of the first clades of temnospondyls to be named on the basis of Metoposaurus diagnosticus from Germany, named in 1842 by German paleontologist Hermann von Meyer. Several additional species of questionable validity were named in the early 20th century from Italy (Metoposaurus santecrucis) and Germany (Metoposaurus stuttgartensis, Metoposaurus heimi). Although metoposaurids are common in Late Triassic deposits of Germany, no bonebeds have been discovered, and the most extensive amount of material comes from the Krasiejow bonebed in Poland. Most recently, a large body of material was recovered from Portugal. Most collecting in North America was conducted in the 20th and 21st centuries, although 'Dictyocephalus elegans,' usually regarded as an indeterminate metoposaurid, was described from the Late Triassic of North Carolina by Joseph Leidy in 1856. The most extensive remains are known from Arizona, New Mexico, Texas, and Wyoming. Collecting efforts in the mid-20th century yielded extensive remains from Morocco and India and more fragmentary remains from Madagascar.

The majority of work on metoposaurids has been descriptive or taxonomic in nature, with a very large number of named taxa, the majority of which have now been synonymized with other taxa or determined to not be diagnostic at the species level. The taxonomy of the clade has undergone significant revision as a result. The commonality of metoposaurid material in some geographic regions and the quality of preservation of many specimens has also permitted additional study that is not as feasible for other temnospondyl clades. The Krasiejow bonebed has been extensively utilized for paleohistological analyses to infer ecological attributes of the local population, with nearly every skeletal element examined.

== Taphonomy ==
Several mass accumulations of dozens of individuals are known from the southwestern United States and Morocco. These have often been interpreted as the result of mass deaths from droughts, although only the deposits in Morocco and Wyoming are interpreted to have preserved the animals where they died; in North America, it is thought that the deposits in Texas and New Mexico results from when the animals aggregated, died, and then were transported. Most skeletons in the latter accumulations are disarticulated, suggesting they were transported by water to the deposition sites. These mass accumulations of metoposaurids are often dominated by one taxa, such as Anaschisma, Buettnerpeton, Dutuitosaurus or Tecovaserpeton. The large gatherings of metoposaurids may have been breeding sites, and were probably common across floodplains in Late Triassic Pangaea.
