= Buettneria maculiceps =

Scientific classification
- Domain: Eukaryota
- Kingdom: Animalia
- Phylum: Arthropoda
- Class: Insecta
- Order: Orthoptera
- Suborder: Ensifera
- Family: Tettigoniidae
- Subfamily: Phaneropterinae
- Tribe: Phlaurocentrini
- Genus: Buettneria; Karsch, 1889
- Species: B. maculiceps

Binomial name
- Buettneria maculiceps Karsch, 1889

Synonyms
- Büttneria maculiceps Karsch, 1889; Stenacropteryx eburneigutta Karsch, 1896

Species of cricket-like animal

Buettneria is a monotypic genus of bush cricket, in the tribe Phlaurocentrini, found in the Democratic Republic of the Congo and Cameroon; the single species is Buettneria maculiceps.
