= Travesser Formation =

Geologic formation in New Mexico, United States

- Stratigraphic range: late Triassic
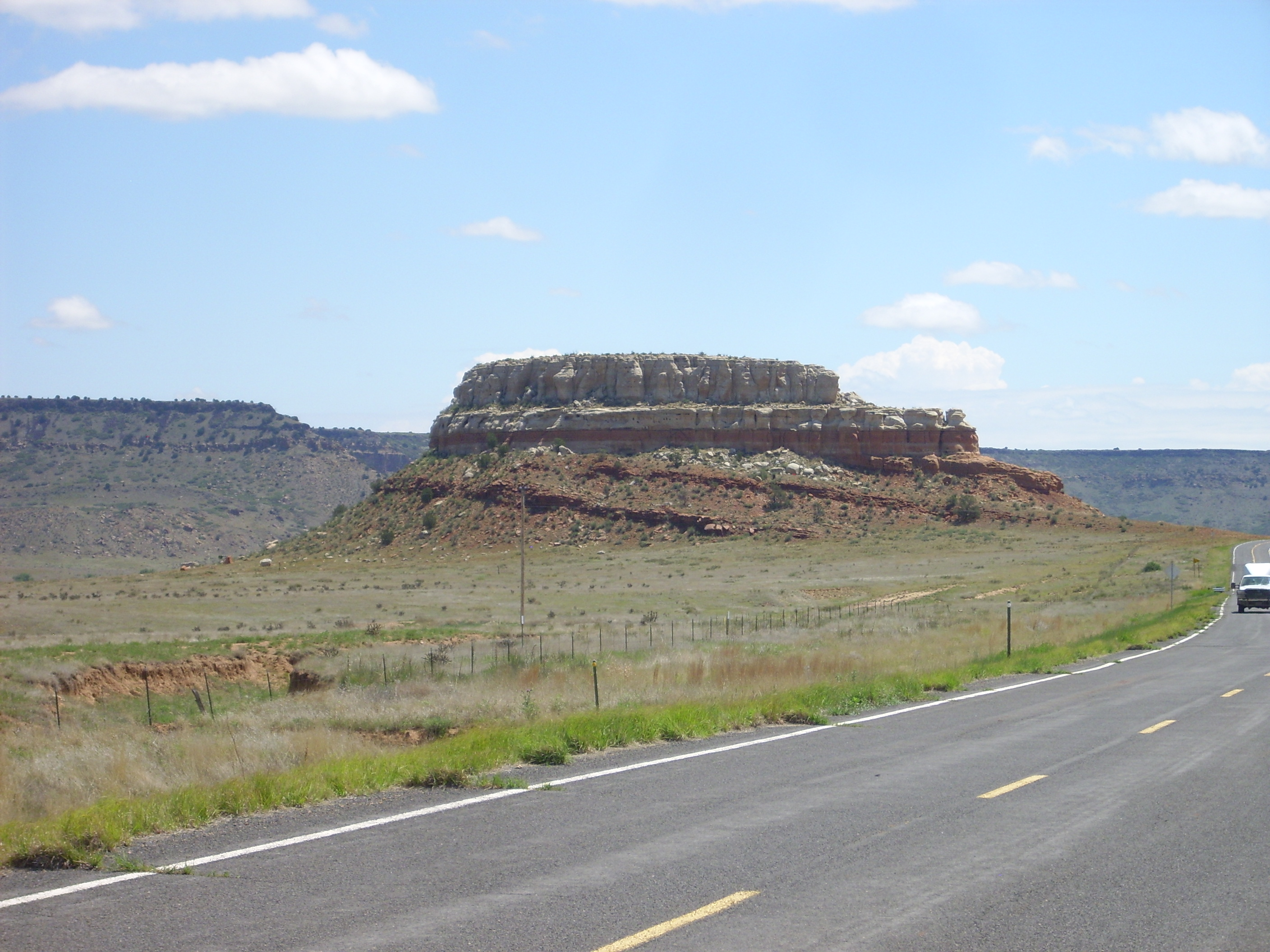
- Steamboat Butte, showing tilted teds of Travesser Formation in its lower half
- Type: Formation
- Unit of: Dockum Group
- Underlies: Sloan Canyon Formation
- Overlies: Baldy Hill Formation
- Thickness: 550 feet (170 m)

Lithology
- Primary: Siltstone, sandstone
- Other: Conglomerate

Location
- Coordinates: 36.93°N 103.48°W
- Region: New Mexico
- Country: United States

Type section
- Named for: Travesser Creek
- Named by: Baldwin and Muelberger
- Year defined: 1959
- Travesser Formation (the United States) Travesser Formation (New Mexico)

The Travesser Formation is a geologic formation in northeastern New Mexico, southeastern Colorado, westernmost Oklahoma, and northwestern Texas, particularly in the Dry Cimarron valley. It preserves fossils dating back to the late Triassic period.

== Description ==
The formation is mostly reddish-brown clay-rich siltstone and fine-grained sandstone, with sandstone beds up to 20 feet (6.1 m) thick. The formation also contains conglomerate lenses up to 20 feet (6.1 m). The total thickness of the formation is 550 feet (170 m). The formation unconformably overlies the Baldy Hill Formation and underlies the Sloan Canyon Formation or locally the Exeter Sandstone.

The formation is usually assigned to the Dockum Group. The proposal of Spencer G. Lucas and his collaborators to abandon the Dockum Group, possibly in favor of the Chinle Group, is highly controversial.

== Fossils ==
A fossil phytosaur skull and metoposaurids have been found in the formation.

== History of investigation ==
The formation was first named by Baldwin and Muelberger in 1959. Lucas et al. rejected the assignment of the formation to the Dockum Group and adjusted the lower contact.

== See also ==
- List of fossiliferous stratigraphic units in New Mexico
- Paleontology in New Mexico
