= Dockum Group =

Geologic group of western Texas and eastern New Mexico

- Stratigraphic range: late Carnian-Rhaetian; ~223–200 Ma
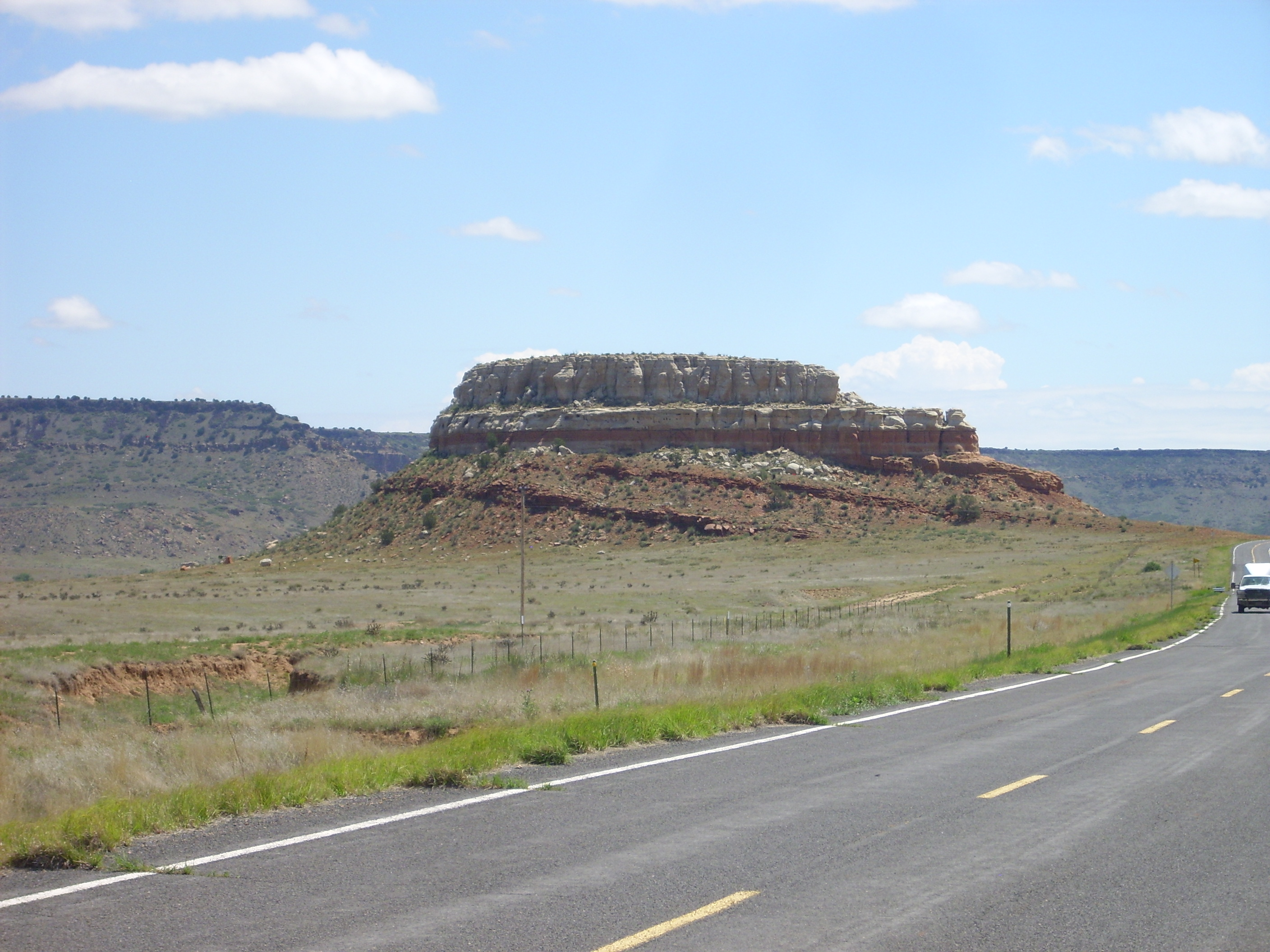
- Steamboat Butte, showing Dockum Group red beds at its base
- Type: Group
- Sub-units: See text
- Underlies: Exeter Sandstone
- Overlies: Anton Chico Formation

Lithology
- Primary: Sandstone
- Other: Siltstone, Mudstone

Location
- Coordinates: 35.356°N 102.910°W
- Country: United States

Type section
- Named for: Town of Dockum, Texas
- Named by: William Fletcher Cummins
- Year defined: 1890

The Dockum is a Late Triassic (approximately early Norian through Rhaetian, or 223–200 Ma) geologic group found primarily on the Llano Estacado of western Texas and eastern New Mexico with minor exposures in southwestern Kansas, eastern Colorado, and Oklahoma panhandle. The Dockum reaches a maximum thickness of slightly over 650 m but is usually much thinner. The Dockum rests on an unconformity over the Anisian (242–234 Ma) aged Anton Chico Formation.

The Dockum and Chinle Formation were deposited roughly at the same time and share many of the same vertebrates and plant fossils. They appear to have very similar paleoenvironments. The two units are approximately separated by the Rio Grande in central New Mexico. This has led to controversy over the stratigraphic nomenclature for the Chinle and Dockum.

== History of investigation ==
There is no designated type locality for this formation. The Dockum was named by William Fletcher Cummins for a good exposure in vicinity of town of Dockum in Dickens County, Texas, in 1890. Lucas included the Dockum Group within the Chinle when he raised the Chinle to group status, but this has not been widely accepted. Dockum was named before the Chinle, and if Lucas is correct, his "Chinle Group" should be named the Dockum Group due to stratigraphic nomenclature rules.

== Stratigraphy ==
Lehman (1994) advocated a simplified stratigraphy of up to five geologic formations. According to his system, the basal unit is the Santa Rosa Sandstone, a braided stream channel-related facies. The Santa Rosa is overlain by the Tecovas Formation (and its New Mexican equivalent, the Garita Creek Formation), which is dominated by overbank (distal floodplain) deposits with lenses of channel-deposits. Minor lacustrine deposits also occur. The Trujillo Sandstone, channel-deposits, and Cooper Canyon Formation (also known as the Bull Canyon Formation), overbank deposits with minor channel and lacustrine deposits, are separated from the Santa Rosa-Tecovas by an unconformity. In eastern New Mexico, the Redonda Formation overlies the Cooper Canyon Formation. The Redonda has gradational eastward transition into the upper Cooper Canyon Formation.

The Santa Rosa-Tecovas sequence has sediments made up of clasts derived from the north, northeast, and east of the Dockum, very similar to clasts found in the lower Chinle. However, the Trujillo-Cooper Canyon sequence's sediments are derived from the Ouachita orogenic belts of the Marathon Uplift.

The Dockum Group in extreme northeastern New Mexico is divided four formations. These are, in ascending stratigraphic order, the Baldy Hill Formation, a mudstone with coarse-grained sandstone lenses; the Travesser Formation, a reddish-brown siltstone and sandstone with some conglomerate lenses; the Sloan Canyon Formation, a red to pale green mudstone with sandstone lenses; and the Sheep Pen Sandstone, a light brown, thinly bedded sandstone. This region is structurally separated from the Dockum Group exposures to the south by the Sierra Grande arch.

The stratigraphy of the Dockum Group was substantially revised by Martz (2026), working off of several decades of more extensive geological mapping and paleontological correlations:

Regional stratigraphic subunits of the Dockum Group
East-central New Mexico		Texas Panhandle		southern Garza County, TX	Howard County, TX	Dry Cimarron Valley (northeast NM, southeast CO, Oklahoma Panhandle)
Redonda Formation				uppermost Cooper Canyon Formation?		Sheep Pen Sandstone
Redonda Formation				uppermost Cooper Canyon Formation?		Sloan Canyon Formation
Redonda Formation				uppermost Cooper Canyon Formation?		Travesser Formation
Bull Canyon Formation				upper Cooper Canyon Formation (= Bull Canyon Member)		
Trujillo Formation				middle Cooper Canyon Formation (= Trujillo Member)		
Garita Creek Formation (= Tecovas Formation)		Tecovas Formation	Magenta beds	lower Cooper Canyon Formation (= Colorado City Member)	Colorado City Formation	Baldy Hill Formation / Cobert Canyon Sandstone? (correlation uncertain)
Santa Rosa Formation	Tres Lagunas Member	Tecovas Formation	Variegated beds	lower Cooper Canyon Formation (= Colorado City Member)	Colorado City Formation	Baldy Hill Formation / Cobert Canyon Sandstone? (correlation uncertain)
Santa Rosa Formation	Los Esteros Member	Tecovas Formation	Variegated beds	lower Cooper Canyon Formation (= Colorado City Member)	Colorado City Formation	Baldy Hill Formation / Cobert Canyon Sandstone? (correlation uncertain)
Santa Rosa Formation	Los Esteros Member	Tecovas Formation	Variegated beds	Boren Ranch Beds (= lowermost Cooper Canyon Formation)	Colorado City Formation	Baldy Hill Formation / Cobert Canyon Sandstone? (correlation uncertain)
Santa Rosa Formation	Tecolotito Member	Camp Springs Conglomerate (= Santa Rosa Formation)				Baldy Hill Formation / Cobert Canyon Sandstone? (correlation uncertain)

== Dockum and Chinle correlation ==
The Land Vertebrate Faunachrons system of Spencer G. Lucas (1998) has been revised and dated more precisely by Martz and Parker (2017) and other studies. The faunachrons are mainly based on first appearances of different phytosaur grades.

Faunachron	Inferred age (Lucas, 1998)	Revised age	Dockum units	Chinle units
Apachean	late Norian toRhaetian	late Norian to Rhaetian (210–202 Ma)	Redonda	Rock Point/Church Rock, "siltstone", upper Owl Rock, upper Painted Desert
Revueltian	early to middle Norian	middle to late Norian (Alaunian to Sevatian, 215–210 Ma)	Bull Canyon, upper Cooper Canyon	lower Owl Rock, lower Painted Desert, upper Sonsela
Adamanian	upper late Carnian	early to middle Norian (Lacian to early Alaunian, 221–215 Ma)	Trujillo, Garita Creek, upper Tecovas, lower-middle Cooper Canyon	lower Sonsela, Blue Mesa, Moss Back, Monitor Butte
Otischalkian	lower late Carnian	latest Carnian to early Norian (earliest Lacian, 229–221 Ma)	Santa Rosa (Tecolotito-Los Esteros members), lowermost Cooper Canyon, lowermost Tecovas?, Colorado City?	Shinarump, Temple Mountain

== See also ==
- List of dinosaur-bearing rock formations
- Chinle Formation
- Triassic land vertebrate faunachrons
