= Contact (geology) =

In geology, a contact is a boundary that separates one rock body from another. A contact can be formed during deposition, by the intrusion of magma, or through faulting or other deformation of rock beds that brings distinct rock bodies into contact.

The geologic subdiscipline of stratigraphy is primarily concerned with depositional contacts, while faults and shear zones are of particular interest in structural geology. Faults and shear zones can be regarded as a form of secondary structure in the rock beds.

== Types of contacts ==
=== Depositional ===
==== Conformable ====
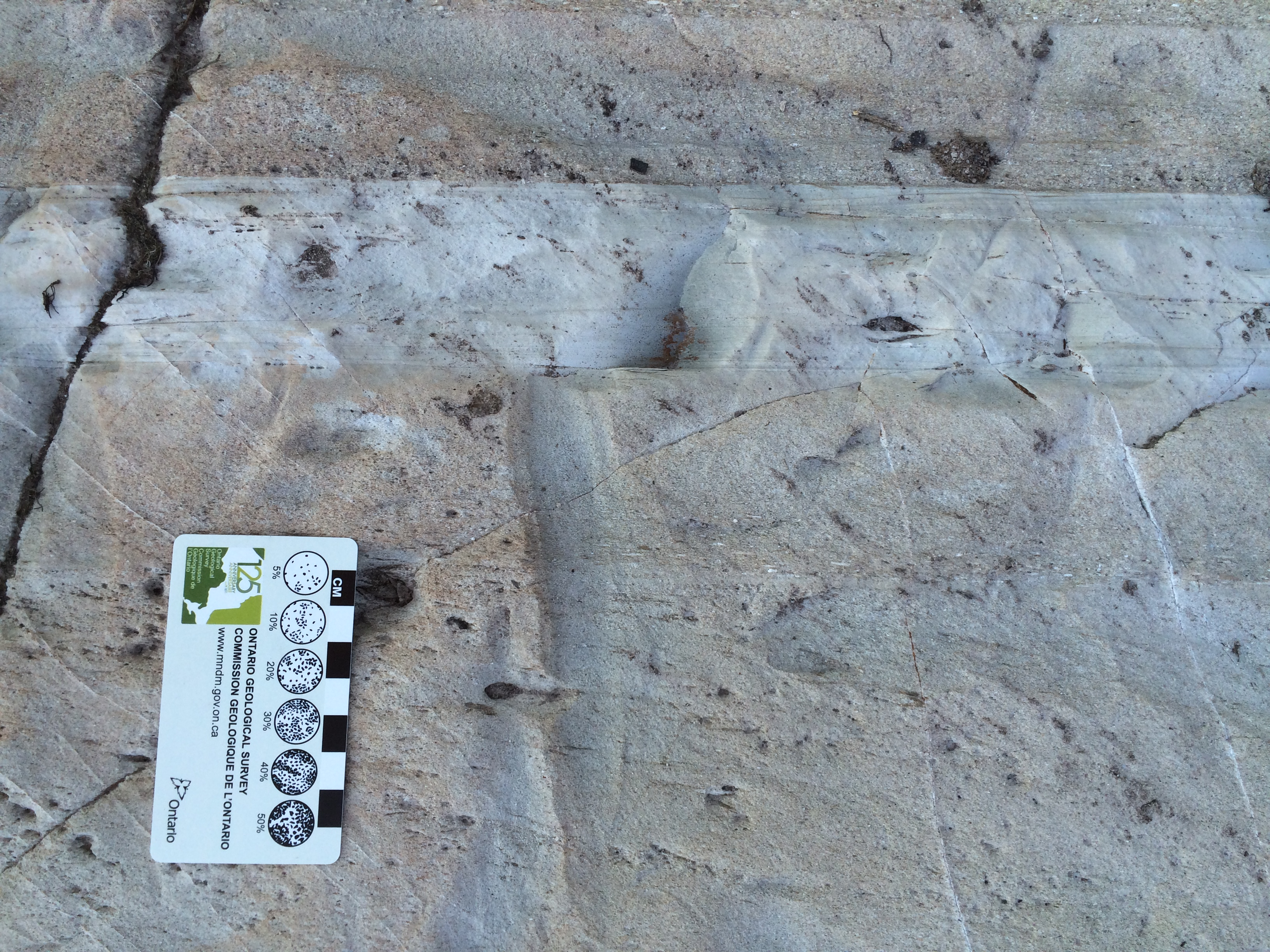
Sharp, conformable sandstone bedding contact, near Terrace Bay, Ontario, Canada

Conformable contacts represent no time gap in the geologic record. They are usually planar, though they may have slightly irregular topography. These contacts represent continual, uninterrupted deposition and accumulation of sedimentary rocks, or represent lava flows.

A conformable contact can be abrupt, where the contact separates beds of distinct lithology. Abrupt contacts coincide with bedding planes and represent a change in depositional environment, but with only a minor hiatus in deposition with no significant erosion. A brief hiatus without erosion is known as a diastem.

Gradational contacts occur where the change in depositional environment takes place over a longer period of time. They are further divided into progressive gradual contacts where the change in lithology is more or less continuous, or intercalated contacts where thin beds of a new lithology appear at the base of the contact zone, become thicker upwards, and completely replaced the old lithology at the top of the contact zone.

Closely related to intercalated contacts is interfingering (also known as intertonguing, interdigitating, or interlocking) of laterally adjacent sedimentary rock bodies. Here the contact breaks down into a series of wedges or tongues that penetrate the adjacent rock body and pinch out individually. These record fluctuations in the location of the boundary between different depositional environments where sediments were simultaneously being laid down.

==== Non-conformable ====
Unconformities are gaps in the geologic record within a stratigraphic unit. These gaps can be caused by periods of non-deposition or by erosion. As a result, two adjacent rock units may have significantly different ages.

=== Intrusive ===
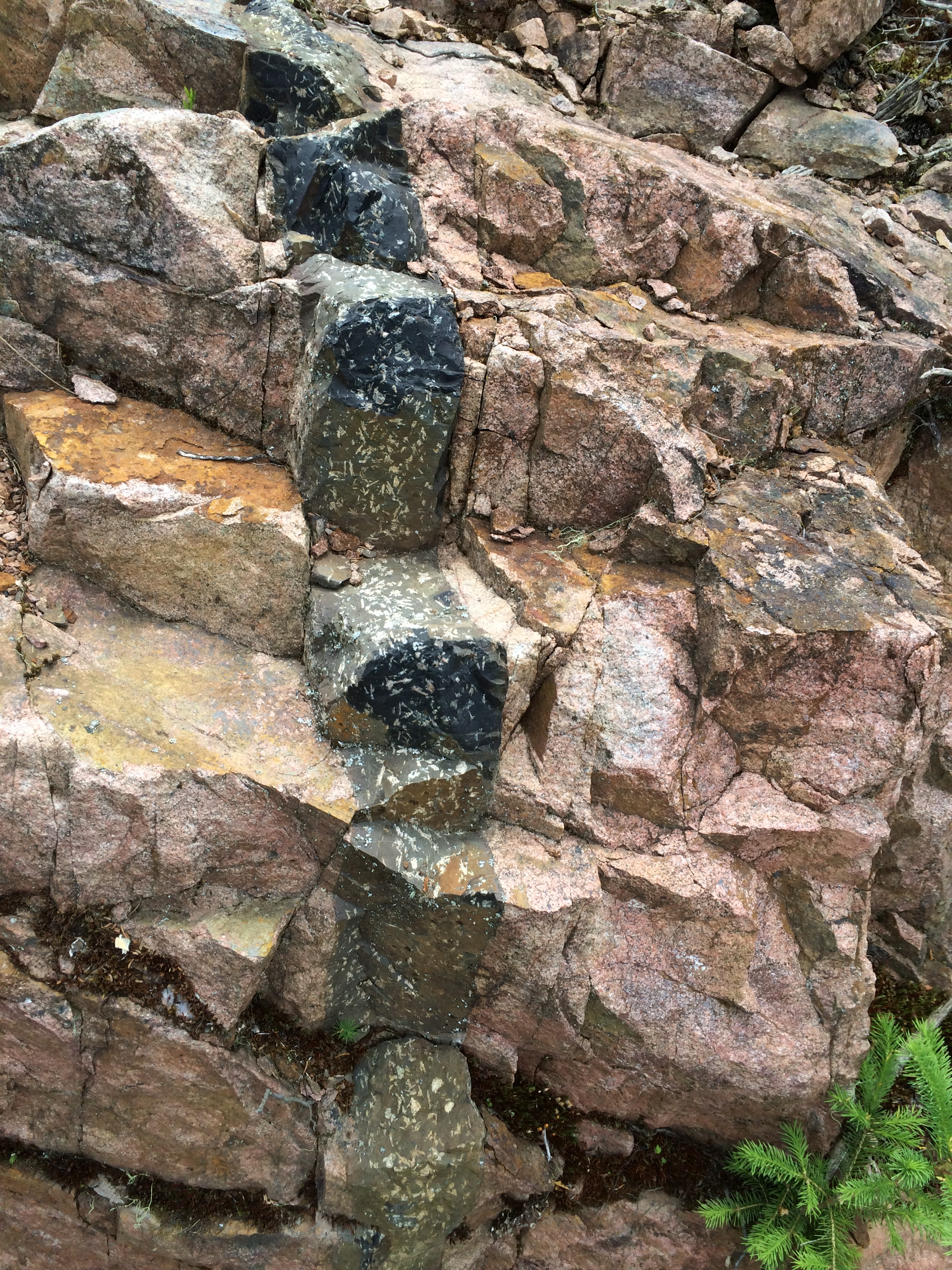
Intrusive dike with chilled margins, near Terrace Bay, Ontario, Canada

Intrusive contacts are the surfaces between host (or country) rock and an intrusive magmatic body. The older country rock is crosscut by a younger magmatic body. The nature of the intruding body depends on its composition and depth. Common examples are igneous dikes, sills, plutons, and batholiths. Depending on the composition of the magma, the intrusive body may have a complex internal structure which can provide insight into its emplacement.

The country rock responds to the immense heat from the intruding body in numerous ways. Chill margins are created if the magma is cooled too quickly to fully crystallise. The result is a distinct boundary of very fine grain igneous rock along the border of the country rock. The surrounding rock may be "baked" through contact metamorphism, resulting in non-foliated metamorphic rocks. Rocks that were originally limestone, quartz sandstone, and shale become marble, quartzite, and hornfels, respectively.

=== Fault ===
Fault and shear zone contacts can be represented by either discrete breaks and discontinuities, or ductile deformation without a physical break in stratigraphy. Fault surface contacts show discrete breaks and have an attitude and position which describes the contact between two formations. These fault surfaces can be polished into slickensided surfaces which depict striations in the direction of the fault movement. Shear zones are different as there is no physical break displayed, but there is displacement.

== Significance and application ==
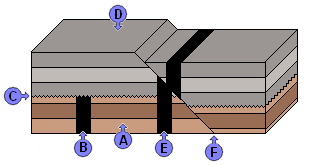
Cross-cutting relationships between contacts and formations can be used to determine the geological history of an area. Events are in order, from oldest to youngest, A to F.

Identifying and understanding the relationship between contacts is important in determining relative ages of rocks and formations. Contacts are a key feature used to create geological maps. Cross-cutting relationships of these contacts can be used to determine the relative geological history of an area or of an outcrop.

== Important geological contacts ==
The golden spikes on geologic timescales represent internationally agreed upon references for the boundaries of the stages in the geologic timescale. These contacts have been identified by the International Commission on Stratigraphy and they are known as GSSPs, or global boundary stratotype section and points. Some of these boundary points are at physical locations, while others are in ice drill core sections, or have been defined chronometrically.

The GSSP for the Danian Stage marks the end of the Cretaceous and the beginning of the Paleocene Series. Located in Tunisia, the contact is described as a reddish layer at the base of a dark clay layer. This reddish layer is the Iridium Anomaly, representative of the fallout of the major impact that resulted in the mass extinction event that ended the Cretaceous.

== See also ==
- Igneous rock – Rock formed through the cooling and solidification of magma or lava
- Metamorphic rock – Rock that was subjected to heat and pressure
- Sedimentary rock – Rock formed by the deposition and cementation of particles
- Structural geology – Science of the description and interpretation of deformation in the Earth's crust
- Law of superposition – Law stating that newer strata stack above older ones
