= Sheep Pen Sandstone =

Geologic formation in New Mexico

- Stratigraphic range: Norian
- Type: Formation
- Unit of: Dockum Group
- Underlies: Exeter Sandstone
- Overlies: Sloan Canyon Formation
- Thickness: 33 meters (108 ft)

Lithology
- Primary: Sandstone

Location
- Coordinates: 36.9714°N 103.1743°W
- Region: Colorado; New Mexico; Oklahoma
- Country: United States

Type section
- Named for: Sheep Pen Canyon
- Named by: B.H. Parker
- Year defined: 1930
- Sheep Pen Sandstone (the United States) Sheep Pen Sandstone (New Mexico)

The Sheep Pen Sandstone is a late Triassic geologic formation exposed in northeastern New Mexico. Fossil theropod tracks have been reported from the formation.

== Description ==
The formation consists of up to 33 meters (108 ft) of thinly bedded light brown sandstone. It with a slight angular unconformity on the Sloan Canyon Formation and is overlain unconformably by the Exeter Sandstone.

The formation is usually assigned to the Dockum Group. The proposal of Spencer G. Lucas and his collaborators to abandon the Dockum Group, possibly in favor of the Chinle Group, is highly controversial.

== Fossils ==
Ichnofossils (track fossils) have been found in thee different locations 10 kilometres (6.2 miles) north of Kenton, Oklahoma. The lower site includes the invertebrates Scoyenia and the dinosauroid Grallator on a scour surface. The traces are numerous but of low diversity. The middle site has at least ten distinct trackways, eight of Grallator and two of Brachychirotherium. The upper site has well-preserved tracks of Grallator and some poorly preserved tracks, possibly of Brachychirotherium. The tracks suggest a stable ecosystem with low diversity, which may be typical of the middle Norian.

== Economic geology ==
The formation has some copper mineralization around the western Oklahoma panhandle. Some 200 mines were in operation from 1884 to 1925. but these likely produced less than 10,000 tons of ore. The ore took the form of chalcocite, malachite, and azurite, deposited both in lenticular beds and in clastic plugs.

== History of investigation ==
The formation was first named by B.H. Parker in 1930.

== See also ==
- List of fossiliferous stratigraphic units in Colorado
- Paleontology in Colorado
