= Baldy Hill Formation =

Geologic formation in New Mexico

- Stratigraphic range: late Triassic
- Type: Formation
- Unit of: Dockum Group
- Underlies: Travesser Formation
- Thickness: Over 35 meters (115 ft)

Lithology
- Primary: Mudstone
- Other: Sandstone

Location
- Coordinates: 36.9708847°N 103.4694368°W
- Region: New Mexico; Oklahoma
- Country: United States

Type section
- Named for: Baldy Hill
- Named by: Baldwin and Muehlberger
- Year defined: 1959
- Baldy Hill Formation (the United States) Baldy Hill Formation (New Mexico)

The Baldy Hill Formation is a geologic formation in northeastern New Mexico and western Oklahoma. It preserves fossils dating back to the late Triassic period.

== Description ==
The Baldy Hill Formation is a dark purple, reddish brown, or greenish gray silty to sandy mudstone with some fine-grained sandstone. Its base is not exposed at the type section, but it is at least 35 meters (115 ft). It is overlain by the Travesser Formation, with the contact marked by the Cobert Canyon Sandstone Bed, a persistent layer of conglomerate beds now assigned to the Baldy Hill Formation or possibly the overlying Travesser Formation (which in turn is sometimes regarded as equivalent to the Chinle Formation.)

The formation may correlate with either the Garita Creek Formation or the Los Esteros Member of the Santa Rosa Formation.

== Fossils ==
Fossils of amphibians and phytosaurs of Carnian to Norian age have been found in the Cobert Canyon Sandstone.

== History of investigation ==
The formation was first named by Baldwin and Muehlberger in 1959, for exposures around Baldy Hill in the valley of the Dry Cimarron.

== See also ==
- List of fossiliferous stratigraphic units in Oklahoma
- Paleontology in Oklahoma
