= Sloan Canyon Formation =

Geologic formation in New Mexico, US

- Stratigraphic range: late Triassic
- Type: Formation
- Unit of: Dockum Group
- Underlies: Sheep Pen Sandstone
- Overlies: Travesser Formation
- Thickness: 38–46 meters (125–151 ft)

Lithology
- Primary: Mudstone
- Other: Siltstone, marl

Location
- Coordinates: 36.9381°N 103.1598°W
- Region: New Mexico
- Country: United States

Type section
- Named for: Sloan Canyon
- Named by: B.H. Parker
- Year defined: 1930
- Sloan Canyon Formation (the United States) Sloan Canyon Formation (New Mexico)

The Sloan Canyon Formation is a late Triassic geologic formation exposed in northeastern New Mexico. Fossil theropod tracks have been reported from the formation.

== Description ==
The Sloan Canyon Formation consists of variegated reddish-brown, purple, and green mudstones, with some beds of siltstone and marl. It rests on the Travesser Formation and is overlain by the Sheep Pen Sandstone. Total thickness is 38–46 meters (125–151 ft).

The formation is usually assigned to the Dockum Group. The proposal of Spencer G. Lucas and his collaborators to abandon the Dockum Group, possibly in favor of the Chinle Group, is highly controversial.

== Fossils ==
A phytosaur skull was found in the Sloan Canyon Formation in 1939, establishing that it was a Triassic formation. The formation is part of one of the largest continuously mapped Triassic vertebrate tracksites, with the earliest studied exposures at Peacock Canyon. Ichnofossils (track fossils) include the archosaurs Brachychirotherium and Chirotherium, a possible therapsid, and the reptile Rhynchosauroides.

== History of investigation ==
The beds now assigned to this unit were previously mistaken for Morrison Formation. The Sloan Canyon Formation was first named by B.H. Parker in 1930.

== See also ==
- List of dinosaur-bearing rock formations
  - List of stratigraphic units with theropod tracks
