= Bell Ranch Formation =

Geologic formation in New Mexico and Oklahoma

- Stratigraphic range: Kimmeridgian; ~155–151 Ma
- Type: Geological formation
- Unit of: San Rafael Group
- Underlies: Morrison Formation
- Overlies: Exeter Sandstone
- Thickness: 66 feet (20 m)

Lithology
- Primary: Sandstone
- Other: Siltstone

Location
- Coordinates: 35.3040°N 103.8867°W
- Approximate paleocoordinates: 31.5°N 49.7°W
- Region: New Mexico; Oklahoma
- Country: United States

Type section
- Named for: Bell Ranch
- Named by: Griggs and Read
- Year defined: 1959
- Bell Ranch Formation (the United States) Bell Ranch Formation (New Mexico)

The Bell Ranch Formation is a Late Jurassic (Kimmeridgian) geologic formation in eastern and northeastern New Mexico and the western Oklahoma panhandle. Fossil theropod tracks have been reported from the formation.

== Description ==
At the type section near Tucumcari, the formation consists of alternating beds of light gray sandstone and brownish red siltstone. Bed thicknesses vary from 2–10 feet (0.61–3.05 m), distinguishing the unit from the massive sandstone of the underlying Exeter Sandstone and poorly bedded sediments of the overlying Morrison Formation. Small gypsum nodules are present in the upper beds. Thickness is up to 66 feet (20 m). Further north, in the valley of the Dry Cimarron, the facies changes to dark mudstone with no cycles and more abundant gypsum. Here the thickness is no more than 8 meters (26 ft).

== Fossil content ==
The formation contains sandy track beds which are "mud-cracked" with finer brownish silty interbeds and an overlying conglomeratic sandstone which fills the mudcracks of the upper bed. Three trackways of large dinosaurs are present.

Ichnofossils

- Grallator (Eubrontes)
- cf. Gypsichnites sp.

== History of investigation ==
The beds making up the unit were originally assigned to the Wanakah Formation, but were renamed by Griggs and Read in 1959 for exposures at Carpenter's Point, 13 miles (21 km) northwest of Tucumcari. The correlation with the Wanakah is uncertain. In 1987, Conrad et al. correlated the "brown-silt member" assigned by Baldwin and Muehlberger to the Morrison Formation in the valley of the Dry Cimarron to the Bell Ranch Formation.

In 1992, Anderson and Lucas advocated abandoning the Bell Ranch Formation in favor of the Summerville Formation. However, this has not been universally accepted.

== See also ==
- List of dinosaur-bearing rock formations
  - List of stratigraphic units with theropod tracks
