= Exeter Sandstone =

Geologic formation in New Mexico, United States

- Stratigraphic range: middle Jurassic
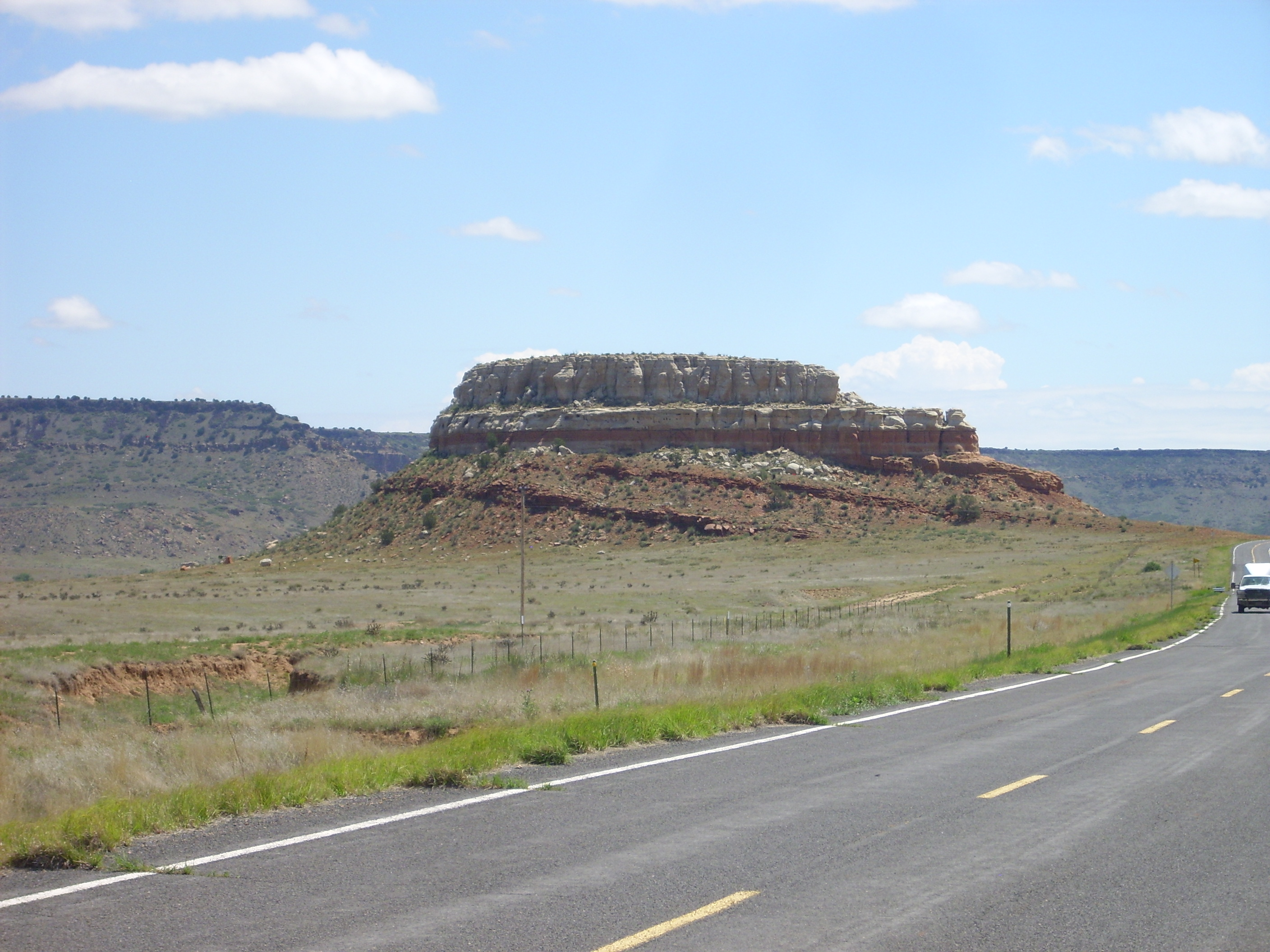
- Exeter Formation capping Steamboat Butte, New Mexico, US
- Type: Formation
- Unit of: Dockum Group
- Underlies: Bell Ranch Formation
- Overlies: Sheep Pen Sandstone
- Thickness: 24 meters (79 ft)

Lithology
- Primary: Sandstone

Location
- Coordinates: 36.9756°N 103.2060°W
- Region: Colorado; New Mexico
- Country: United States

Type section
- Named for: Exter Post Office
- Named by: W.T. Lee
- Year defined: 1902
- Exeter Sandstone (the United States) Exeter Sandstone (New Mexico)

The Exeter Sandstone is a geologic formation exposed in northeastern New Mexico. Its age is poorly controlled, but it is thought to have been deposited during the middle Jurassic.

== Description ==
The formation consists of up to 24 meters (79 ft) of white to pale pink crossbedded quartz sandstone. It unconformably overlies the Sheep Pen Sandstone and is in turn overlain by the Bell Ranch Formation. The Exeter Formation varies greatly in thickness, with the maximum thickness in synclinal valleys of the underlying Dockum Group and the formation being absent on some anticlinal crests of the Dockum Group.

The formation has long been thought to have formed in the eastern part of the Entrada Formation dune sea and thus to be correlative with the Entrada Formation, and Spencer G. Lucas and coinvestigators recommended demoting the Exeter Sandstone to member rank within the Entrada Formation. However, age control is poor on the Exeter Sandstone, and other investigators have retained the Exeter Sandstone at formation rank until the correlation becomes clearer.

== History of investigation ==
The formation was first named by W.T. Lee in 1902 for exposures near the Exter Post Office.

== See also ==
- List of fossiliferous stratigraphic units in Colorado
- Paleontology in Colorado
