= Diastem =

In geology, a diastem is a short interruption in sedimentation with little or no erosion. They can also be described as very short unconformities (more precisely as very short paraconformities). In 1917, Joseph Barrell estimated the rate of deposition of succession from the available radiometric age. His outcrops showed that the strata accumulation was at the rate of thousands of years per foot rather than hundreds. He stated that diastems are universal in sedimentary rocks and explained them as a product of fluctuation of base level.

== Definition ==
The International Commission on Stratigraphy defines a diastem as "[a] short interruption in deposition with little or no erosion before resumption of sedimentation".

== Duration ==
Studies indicate that the time gap represented in diastems ranges from a few hundred to a few thousand years in shelf settings as well as throughout the Paleozoic.
