= Anton Chico Formation =

Geologic formation in New Mexico, US

- Stratigraphic range: Anisian
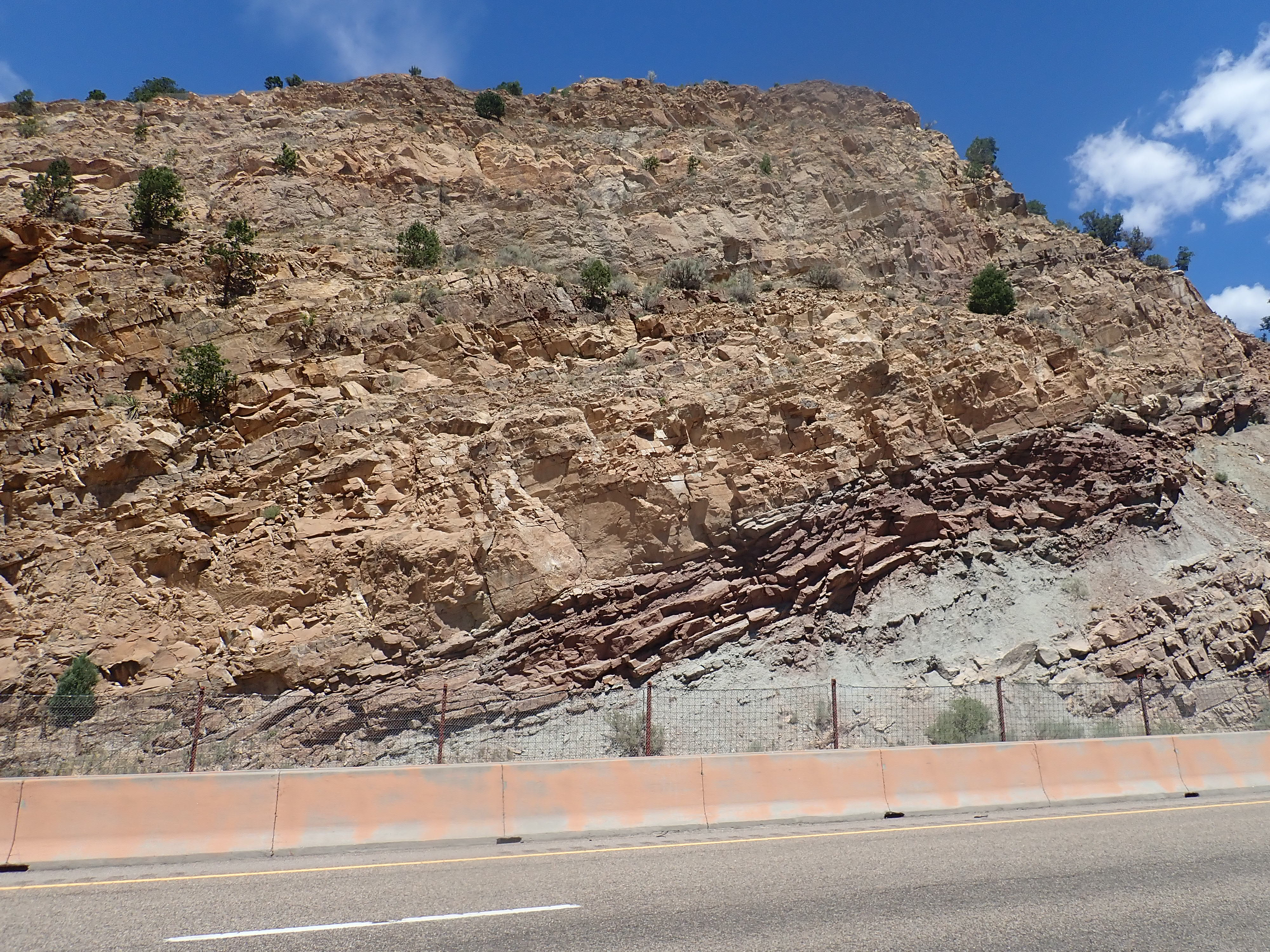
- Anton Chico Formation along I-25 in Glorieta Pass. The Anton Chico is the red beds at lower right. Overlying this is tan beds of the Santa Rosa Formation.
- Type: Formation
- Underlies: Santa Rosa Formation
- Overlies: Artesia Group
- Thickness: 102 feet (31 m)

Lithology
- Primary: Sandstone
- Other: Mudstone, Conglomerate

Location
- Coordinates: 35.2078°N 105.1431°W
- Region: New Mexico
- Country: United States

Type section
- Named for: Anton Chico, New Mexico
- Named by: Lucas and Hunt
- Year defined: 1987
- Anton Chico Formation (the United States) Anton Chico Formation (New Mexico)

The Anton Chico Formation is a geologic formation exposed in New Mexico that was deposited in the Anisian Age of the middle Triassic Period.

== Description ==
The formation consists mostly of very fine to medium-grained, red-brown to gray-red sandstone with minor silty mudstone and conglomerate, including a basal conglomerate bed. The total thickness of the formation is 22.1 meters (73 ft) at the type section. The formation is exposed along the Pecos River as far south as Santa Rosa, New Mexico.

The formation is overlain by the Santa Rosa Formation and lies on the Artesia Group.

== Fossils ==
The Anton Chico Formation was originally correlated with the Holbrook Member of the Moenkopi Formation based on the finding of Eocyclotosaurus in the formation. The formation also contains the trace fossil Isopodichnus and traces of actinopterygian fish in coprolites. Amphibian fossils are abundant and diverse. These include fragments of paracyclotosaurid fossils, possibly related to Stanocephalosaurus, and an unidentified capitosauroid. Reptile fossils are more common and diverse than in the Holbrook Member and include erythrosuchids, other archosaurs, rauisuchians, and prolacertiforms. The formation has also yielded two incomplete skeletons of a large archosaur and the primitive poposauroid Arizonasaurus babbitti.

== History of investigation ==
The beds making up this formation were originally the lowest informal member of the Santa Rosa Formation, but were designated as the Anton Chico Formation by Spencer G. Lucas and Adrian Hunt in 1987. Lucas and Hunt subsequently reduced the unit to member rank within the Moenkopi Formation, but its inclusion in the Moenkopi has not been universally accepted. Some red beds previously mapped as Bernal Formation, particularly in its more northern and western exposures, are now thought to belong to the Anton Chico.
